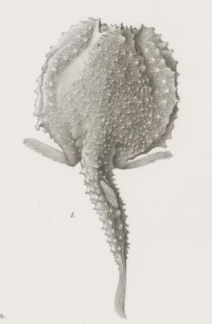

Conservation status
- Data Deficient (IUCN 3.1)

Scientific classification
- Kingdom: Animalia
- Phylum: Chordata
- Class: Actinopterygii
- Order: Lophiiformes
- Family: Ogcocephalidae
- Genus: Halieutopsis
- Species: H. tumifrons

Binomial name
- Halieutopsis tumifrons Garman, 1899

= Halieutopsis tumifrons =

Species of fish

Halieutopsis tumifrons, the truncate-snout deepsea batfish, is a species of marine ray-finned fish belonging to the family Ogcocephalidae, the deep-sea batfishes. This species is the type species of the genus Halieutopsis. It is a little known species only known from the two type specimens collected off the Galápagos Islands in 1890.

== Taxonomy ==
Halieutopsis tumifrons was first formally described in 1890 by the American zoologist Samuel Garman with its type locality given as off the Galápagos Islands at 0°36'N, 86°46'W, Albatross station 3400A, from a depth of 1,322 fathoms (7,932 ft; 2,418 m). When he described this species Garman classified it in a new monospecific genus, Halieutopsuis, this species is therefore the type species of Halieutopsis by monotypy. Within its genus the almost scale-less underside suggests that it is a close relative of H. nudiventer, H. bathyoreos, H. ingerorum, H. okamurai and H. taiwanea. The genus Halieutopsis is classified within the "Indo-Pacific clade" of the family Ogcocephalidae. The family Ogcocephalidae is classified in the monotypic suborder Ogcocephaloidei within the order Lophiiformes, the anglerfishes in the 5th edition of Fishes of the World.

== Etymology ==
Halieutopsis tumifrons has the genus name Halieutopsis which suffixes opsis, meaning "looking like" to halieut which is derived from halieutaea, Greek for an "angler" or "fisherman". This name is a reference to this genus' resemblance to the genus Halieutaea. The specific name, tumifrons. combines tumis, which means "a swelling", with frons, meaning "front", an allusion to the swollen anterioor margins on the suboperculum and under the eye.

== Description ==
Halieutopsis tumifrons has 5 or 6 soft rays supporting the dorsal fin while there are 4 soft rays supporting the anal fin. The disc of the body is very flattened and has an almost quadrangular shape with a marked indentation on its frontal edge. The lower surface of the disc is naked except for scales on either side of the anus which are part of the lateral line. The rostrum is small, it overhangs the mouth but only extends as far as the front edge of the disc. It has small, rather closely set eyes. The esca possesses a pair of round and slender lobes ventrally and a dorsal lobe which is elongated in the middle and at its far rear tip there are 2 cirri. The membrane connecting the pectoral fin to the body is reduvced and these fins have clear elbow like joints. The largest of the two specimens collected had a standard length of 6.9 cm (2.7 in).

== Distribution and habitat ==
Halieutopsis tumifron is known only from the two specimens collected in 1890 from the USS Albatross which was on a survey expedition. The specimens were collected at two different localities west of the Galápagos Islands, the first around 170 km (110 mi) east of San Cristóbal Island and the second 100 km (62 mi) north of Darwin Island. It is the only species in the genus Halieutopsis to occur in the Eastern Pacific Ocean. Thi species is a deepwater fish and the specimens were collected at depths between 2,418 and 2,487 m (7,933 and 8,159 ft).
