= Halieutopsis oblonga =

Conservation status
- Least Concern (IUCN 3.1)

Scientific classification
- Kingdom: Animalia
- Phylum: Chordata
- Class: Actinopterygii
- Order: Lophiiformes
- Family: Ogcocephalidae
- Genus: Halieutopsis
- Species: H. oblonga

Binomial name
- Halieutopsis oblonga (H. M. Smith & Radcliffe, 1912)

Synonyms
- Coelophrys oblonga H. M. Smith & Radcliffe, 1912

Species of fish

Halieutopsis oblonga, the oblong deep-sea batfish, is a species of marine ray-finned fish belonging to the family Ogcocephalidae, the deep sea batfishes. This species is found in the Western Pacific Ocean.

== Taxonomy ==
Halieutopsis oblonga was first formally described as Coelophrys oblonga in 1912 by the American ichthyologists Hugh McCormick Smith and Lewis Radcliffe with its type locality given as near Binang Unang Island in the Gulf of Tomini at 0°04'00"S, 121°36'00"E off Sulawesi at Albatross station 5607 from a depth of 761 fathoms (4,566 ft; 1,392 m). In 1967 Margaret G. Bradbury examined the holotype, finding it to be very degraded, and suggested that it was closer to Dibranchus rather than Coelophrys. In 2021 Ho "Hans" Hsuan-Ching confirmed that H. oblonga should be classified in Halieutopsis. The genus Halieutopsis is classified within the "Indo-Pacific clade" of the family Ogcocephalidae. The family Ogcocephalidae is classified in the monotypic suborder Ogcocephaloidei within the order Lophiiformes, the anglerfishes in the 5th edition of Fishes of the World.

== Etymology ==
Hamieutopsis oblonga has the genus name Halieutopsis which suffixes opsis, meaning "looking like" to halieut which is derived from halieutaea, Greek for an "angler" or "fisherman". This name is a reference to this genus' resemblance to the genus Halieutaea. The specific name oblonga means "oblong", an allusion that Smith and Radcliffe did not explain but mat refer to the shape of the head that they described as "narrow, elongate, not disk-like" and being "typical Dibranchus".

== Description ==
Halieutopsis oblonga has the head and body flattened into a subtriangular or elliptical disc with a length that is slightly shorter than its width. It has a narrow tail which tapers towards the caudal fin. The cranium is slightly elevated above surface of disc, the rostrum is a short, wide shelf comprising five enlarged tubercles and a number of smaller ones. The tubercle on the tip of the rostrum has 3 upwardly, directed spines with two pairs of twin spined tubercles on its forward edge. The illicial cavity is broad, its opening is broader than it is high and it is just visible when viewed from below. The esca sits completely within the illicial cavity and has 3 lobes. The upper lobe has a pair of cirri on its front and a pair of flaps to the rear, the two lower lobes are rounded. The eyes are relatively small and are directed upwards and outwards. The mouth is relatively large and has bristle-like teeth arranged in slender bands in both jaws, those in the upper jaw are not visible when the mouth is closed. There are no teeth on the roof of the mouth although there are two small, well-separated patches of teeth on the tongue. The main tubercles cover the entire body apart for the gill openings, eyes, illicial cavity, and fins, and they have no small spinules between then. Those on the upper surface are densely arranged, small and simple, typically with 5 or 6 facets. The tubercles on the edge of the disc have two points at their tips as are those on subopercle also have two points> the tubercles on the lower body are simple and also densely set. The tubercles on the tail are simple, set in four rows on the upper surface, two rows on each side associated with the lateral line and two rows on the lower surface. Specimens have standard lengths between 32.1 and 62.9 cm (12.6 and 24.8 in).

== Distribution and habitat ==
Halieutopsis oblonga is found in the Western Pacific Ocean where it has been recorded from the waters off Japan, Taiwan, the Philippines, Indonesia, the Solomon Islands and Vanuatu. It occurs at depths between 690 and 1,886 m (2,264 and 6,188 ft)>
