= Halieutopsis nudiventer =

Scientific classification
- Kingdom: Animalia
- Phylum: Chordata
- Class: Actinopterygii
- Order: Lophiiformes
- Family: Ogcocephalidae
- Genus: Halieutopsis
- Species: H. nudiventer

Binomial name
- Halieutopsis nudiventer (Lloyd, 1909)

Synonyms
- Dibranchus nudiventer Lloyd, 1909

Species of fish

Halieutopsis nudiventer, the naked-belly deepsea batfish, is a species of ray-finned fish belonging to the family Ogcocephalidae, the deep sea batfishes. It was originally found in the eastern Indian Ocean around the Bay of Bengal, but is now known to have a wider distribution in the Indo-Pacific.

== Taxonomy ==
Halieutopsis nudiventer Was first formally described as Halieutopsis nudiventer in 1909 by the British biologist and Indian Medical Service doctor Richard E. Lloyd with its type locality given As the Bay of Bengal off Arakan in modern Myanmar. In 1999 Margaret G. Bradbury examined the remains of the type specimen of D. nudiventer and determined that it did not belong to Dibranchus, stating it belonged in Halieutopsis and suggesting that it appeared closest to H. vermicularis. In 2021 Ho "Hans" Hsuan-Ching confirmed that H. nudiventer was a valid species, that it should be classified in Halieutopsis and that H. vermicularis was a junior synonym of H. nasuta. The genus Halieutopsis is classified within the "Indo-Pacific clade" of the family Ogcocephalidae. The family Ogcocephalidae is classified in the monotypic suborder Ogcocephaloidei within the order Lophiiformes, the anglerfishes in the 5th edition of Fishes of the World.

== Etymology ==
Halieutopsis nudiventer has the genus name Halieutopsis which suffixes opsis, meaning "looking like" to halieut which is derived from halieutaea, Greek for an "angler" or "fisherman". This name is a reference to this genus' resemblance to the genus Halieutaea. The specific name nudiventer means "naked belly", an allusion to the lack of spines on its ventral surfaces.

== Description ==
Halieutopsis nudiventer has its head and body flattened into an oval disc, with thecranium slightly higher than the rest of the disc, which has alength that is just greater than its width. The rostrum is a small shelf-like structure protruding from the head and overhanging the mouth. The tubercle on the tip of the rostrum is an unforked spine which points upwards. The illicial cavity is a slight depression which has an opening which is wider than its height, the illicial cavity is just visible from below. It has a three lobed esca with large, leaf-like upper lobe which has two small flaps on the tip, and pair of rounded lower lobes. It has very small, oval-shaped eyes which point upwards and outwards. The mouth is moderately large with the upper jaw overlapping the lower jaw. The main tubercles on the upper surface are dispersed, needle-like and typically have between 10 and 14 facets. The tubercles on the edge of the disc are forked with depressions at their bases and those on the subopercle are split into 3 or 4 short spines while those on the tail are simple spines with no forks. The lower surfaces of the disk and tail are naked, apart a group of between 2 and 6 tubercles at the base of the pelvic fins., The only tubercles on the tail are associated with the lateral line. The standard length varies between 38.3 and 77.5 mm (1.51 and 3.05 in)>

== Distribution and habitat ==
Halieutopsis nudiventer is found in the Indo-Pacific region where it has been recorded as far west as South Africa east as far as New Caledonia and Vanuatu. It is found at depths between 430 and 1,760 m (1,410 and 5,770 ft), typically at depths of less than 1,000 m (3,300 ft).
