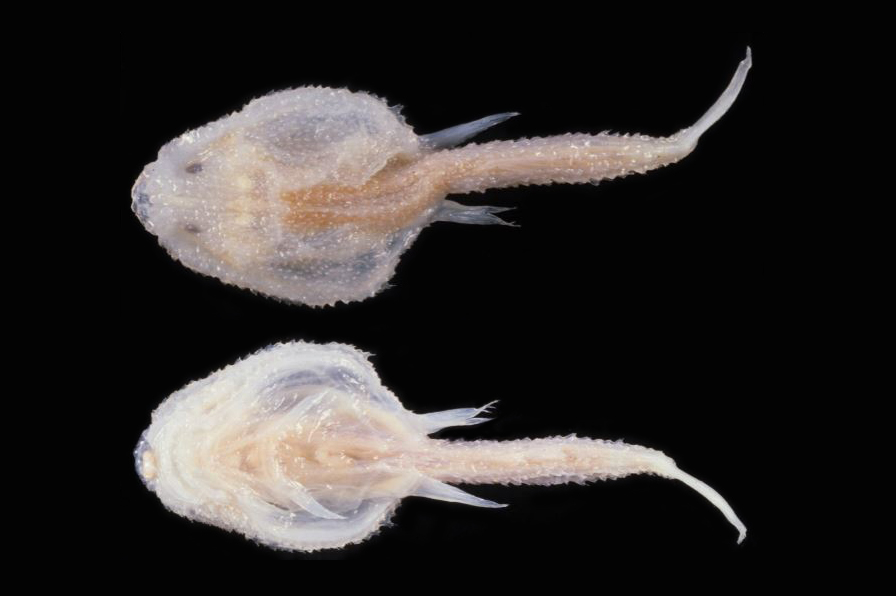

Conservation status
- Data Deficient (IUCN 3.1)

Scientific classification
- Kingdom: Animalia
- Phylum: Chordata
- Class: Actinopterygii
- Order: Lophiiformes
- Family: Ogcocephalidae
- Genus: Halieutopsis
- Species: H. andriashevi

Binomial name
- Halieutopsis andriashevi Bradbury, 1988

= Halieutopsis andriashevi =

Species of fish

Halieutopsis andriashevi, Andriashev's deepsea batfish, is a species of ray-finned fish belonging to the family Ogcocephalidae, the deep sea batfishes. This fish is found in the western Indian Ocean.

== Taxonomy ==
Halieutopsis andriashevi was first formally described in 1988 by the American ichthyologist Margaret G. Bradbury with its type locality given as the central western Indian Ocean at 19°09'S, 63°07.5'E, from a depth between 3,800 and 4,000 m (12,500 and 13,100 ft). The genus Halieutopsis is classified within the "Indo-Pacific clade" of the family Ogcocephalidae. The family Ogcocephalidae is classified in the monotypic suborder Ogcocephaloidei within the order Lophiiformes, the anglerfishes in the 5th edition of Fishes of the World.

== Etymology ==
Halieutopsis andriashevi has the genus name Halieutopsis which suffixes opsis, meaning "looking like" to halieut which is derived from halieutaea, Greek for an "angler" or "fisherman". This name is a reference to this genus' resemblance to the genus Halieutaea. The specific name honours the Russian ichthyologist Anatoly Petrovich Andriashev, who recognised this as a new species and gave the type to Bradbury and waited patiently for 20 years before the description was published.

== Description ==
Halieutopsis andriashevi has a comparatively small disc with the edge of the disc being much shorter and a narrower cranium in relation to its standard length with relatively small eyes too. The disk margin is equivalent to 34.4–38.2% of the standard length. The tubercles along the margin of the disc and the sides of the caudal peduncle are vertically flattened and touch one another to create continuous, serrated ridges. The ridges on the sides of the caudal peduncle are even, reaching either side of the caudal fin to resemble keels. The esca is only slightly protruding from the illicial cavity, and slopes forward at an obtuse angle. The gill rakers are slender, triangular plates positioned at tight angle to the gill arch, each with very small teeth in a patch on the distal end. The pelvic and pectoral fins are relatively small, with the pectoral bases united with body by a membrane. The dorsal and anal fin each contains 4 soft eays with the last ray in each fin connected to the body by a membrane. The colour of the preserved specimens is light brown to creamy white, rather translucent with thin skin. The standard length of the type specimen, a female, is 4.6 cm (1.8 in).

== Distribution and habitat ==
Halieutopsis andriashevi is known only from two specimens collected from deep waters in the Indian Ocean. The first specimens, the type was collected in the central western Indian Ocean north of Rodrigues while the second specimen was collected between Sri Lanka and Aceh in the northeastern Indian Ocean. The specimens were collected from depths between 3,800 and 4,020 m (12,470 and 13,190 ft).
