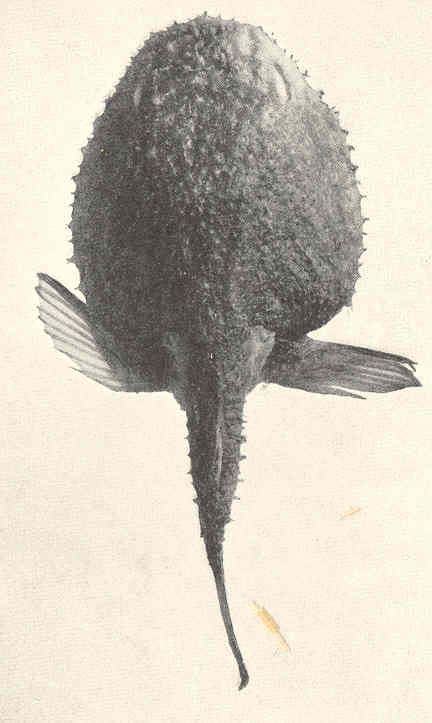
- Dorsal view

Conservation status
- Least Concern (IUCN 3.1)

Scientific classification
- Kingdom: Animalia
- Phylum: Chordata
- Class: Actinopterygii
- Order: Lophiiformes
- Family: Ogcocephalidae
- Genus: Halieutopsis
- Species: H. simula

Binomial name
- Halieutopsis simula (H. M. Smith & Radcliffe, 1912)

Synonyms
- Dibranchus simulus H. M. Smith & Radcliffe, 1912; Dibranchus infranudus de Beaufort, 1962

= Halieutopsis simula =

Species of fish

Halieutopsis simula, the fluffy-esca deepsea batfish, is a species of marine ray-finned fish belonging to the family Ogcocephalidae, the deep sea batfishes. This species is found in the Indo-West Pacific region.

== Taxonomy ==
Halieutopsis simula was first formally described as Dibranchus simulus in 1912 by the American ichthyologists Hugh McCormick Smith and Lewis Radcliffe with its type locality given as near Malavatuan Island off southern Luzon at 13°48'30"N, 120°28'40"E, Albatross station 5283, from a depth 280 fathoms (1,680 ft; 510 m). In 1967 Margaret G. Bradbury reclassified this species as a member of the genus Halieutopsis. The genus Halieutopsis is classified within the "Indo-Pacific clade" of the family Ogcocephalidae. The family Ogcocephalidae is classified in the monotypic suborder Ogcocephaloidei within the order Lophiiformes, the anglerfishes in the 5th edition of Fishes of the World.

== Etymology ==
Hamieutopsis sumula has the genus name Halieutopsis which suffixes opsis, meaning "looking like" to halieut which is derived from halieutaea, Greek for an "angler" or "fisherman". This name is a reference to this genus' resemblance to the genus Halieutaea. The specific name simula is a diminutive of simus which means "snub-nosed", a reference to the small rostrum of this species.

== Description ==
Hamieutopsis simula has the head and body shaped like a box-like disc which is not highly flattened. The eye s are directed to the side rather than upwards. The illicial cavity has a ventrally pointing triangular opening which is visible only when viewed from below. The esca has a mass of filaments. There are no tubercles on the lower body and the remainder of the body has simple tubercles apart from the rostrum which has small three pointed tubercle on it, the two pointed tubercles on the edge of the disc and the small three pointed tubercles of the subopercle. This species has a maximum published standard length of 6.5 cm (2.6 in).

== Distribution and habitat ==
Hamieutopsis simula is found in the Eastern Indian Ocean and Western Pacific Ocean and has been recorded off Western Australia, Indonesia, the Philippines and Taiwan. It has been found at depths between 430 and 612 m (1,411 and 2,008 ft).
