= Dibranchus tremendus =

Conservation status
- Least Concern (IUCN 3.1)

Scientific classification
- Kingdom: Animalia
- Phylum: Chordata
- Class: Actinopterygii
- Order: Lophiiformes
- Family: Ogcocephalidae
- Genus: Dibranchus
- Species: D. tremendus

Binomial name
- Dibranchus tremendus Bradbury, 1999

Synonyms
- Dibranchus atlanticus Roule, 1916 (not of Peters, 1876)

Species of marine ray-finned fish

Dibranchus tremendus is a species of marine ray-finned fish belonging to the family Ogcocephalidae, the deep-sea batfishes. It is found in deep water in the Atlantic Ocean. This species was identified as a different species from Dibranchus atlanticus in 1999. It is the largest species in its genus.

== Taxonomy ==
Dibranchus tremendus was first formally described in 1999 by the American ichthyologist Margaret G. Bradbury with its type locality given as the Caribbean Sea at 9°32'N, 76°38'W, Oregon II, station 11239, depth 1,463 m (4,800 ft). In her paper Bradbury states that Louis Roule illustrated this species, as Dibranchus atlanticus from Cape Verde in 1916. The genus Dibranchus is classified within the "Indo-Pacific clade" of the family Ogcocephalidae. The family Ogcocephalidae is classified in the monotypic suborder Ogcocephaloidei within the order Lophiiformes, the anglerfishes in the 5th edition of Fishes of the World.

== Etymology ==
Dibranchus tremendus is classified in the genus Dibranchus, a name which prefixes di, meaning "two", on to branchus, meaning "gills", a reference to only the second and third gill arches having gills, the fourth having no gill filaments. The specific epithet tremendus, means "something to be trembled at", an allusion to the large size and spiny skin of this fish.

== Description ==
Dibranchus tremendus has its dorsal spine supported by between 4 and 7 soft rays and its anal fin by 4 soft rays. The tubercles in the skin do not have the radiating rows of spinules that those of D. atlanticus have. The spines of the tubercles are very long and robust, especially on the sides of the caudal peduncle. The lower surface of the disc shaped body is covered in tubercles. The main tubercles of the lower surface of the caudal peduncle are very large and take up the entire lower surface except for a few small tubercles in the middle part between the anus and the base of the anal fin. The overall colour is brown. This species is the largest species in the genus Dibranchus with a maximum published total length of 19.2 cm (7.6 in).

== Distribution and habitat ==
Dibranchus tremendus is found in the Atlantic Ocean. In the western Atlantic it is found in the Caribbean Sea and Gulf of Mexico, it has also been recorded from the Hydrographer Canyon, south of Hudson Canyon, from close to Block Canyon and the Bear Seamount. In the eastern Atlantic it has been recorded in Cape Verde and between the Gulf of Guinea and Namibia. This benthic fish is found at depths between 750 and 3,000 m (2,460 and 9,840 ft), typically in excess of 1,000 m (3,300 ft).

== Biology ==
Dibranchus tremendus, like its congeners, has pelagic eggs and larvae. Deep sea batfishes are sit and wait predators, luring prey with the illicium, the "fishing rod", and esca, the "lure" or "bait", to within striking distance of the large mouth. The fishes in this family are known to feed on small snails, clams, scallops, worms, small crustaceans and occasionally small fishes. Ogcocephalidae fishes do have a luminous esca, as in some other groups of anglerfishes, but also secretes a fluid thought to act as a chemical lure which attracts prey.
