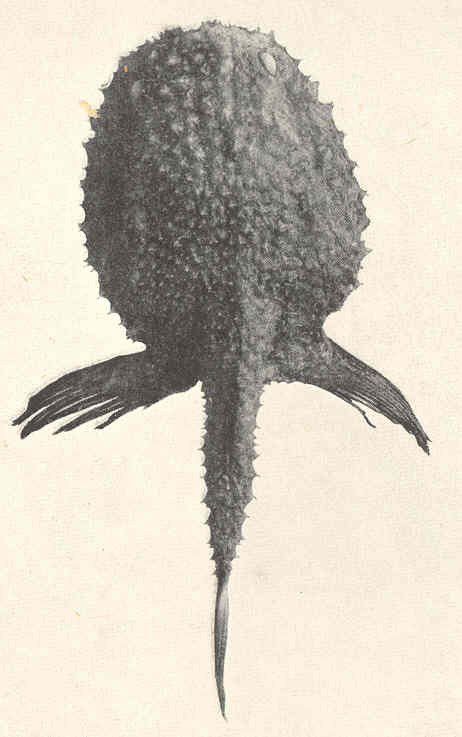
- Dorsal view

Conservation status
- Least Concern (IUCN 3.1)

Scientific classification
- Kingdom: Animalia
- Phylum: Chordata
- Class: Actinopterygii
- Order: Lophiiformes
- Family: Ogcocephalidae
- Genus: Halieutopsis
- Species: H. stellifera

Binomial name
- Halieutopsis stellifera (H. M. Smith & Radcliffe, 1912)

Synonyms
- Dibranchus stellifer H. M. Smith & Radcliffe, 1912

= Halieutopsis stellifera =

Species of fish

Halieutopsis stellifera, the starry deepsea batfish, is a species of marine ray-finned fish belonging to the family Ogcocephalidae, the deep sea batfishes. This species is found in the Indo-West Pacific region.

== Taxonomy ==
Halieutopsis stellifer was first formally described as Dibranchus stellifer in 1912 by the American ichthyologists Hugh McCormick Smith and Lewis Radcliffe with its type locality given as the Flores Sea off Sulawesi at 5°36'30"S, 120°49'00"E, Albatross station 5660, from a depth 692 fathoms (4,152 ft; 1,266 m). In 1967 Margaret G. Bradbury reclassified this species as a member of the genus Halieutopsis. The genus Halieutopsis is classified within the "Indo-Pacific clade" of the family Ogcocephalidae. The family Ogcocephalidae is classified in the monotypic suborder Ogcocephaloidei within the order Lophiiformes, the anglerfishes in the 5th edition of Fishes of the World.

== Etymology ==
Halieutopsis stellifera has the genus name Halieutopsis which suffixes opsis, meaning "looking like" to halieut which is derived from halieutaea, Greek for an "angler" or "fisherman". This name is a reference to this genus' resemblance to the genus Halieutaea. The specific name stellifer means "star bearing", an allusion to the star shaped tubercles on the upper surface of the body, each capped with a long spine.

== Description ==
Halieutopsis stellifera has 5 or 6 soft rays in the dorsal fin while the anal fin has 4 soft rays. The head and body shaped like a box-like disc which is not highly flattened. The fins are grey to black but fade as the fish grows. The rostrum is quite blunt and clearly overhangs the mouth, with small, simple to three pointed tubercles. The esca has three lobes, the two lower lobes are rounded and well-separatedwhile the upper lobe is leaf-like with a pair of cirri at its tip. The upper surface is covered with simple tubercles, those on the edge of the disc are forked, those on the tail are unforked and there are small tubercles between the larger ones. This species has a maximum published standard length of 7.1 cm (2.8 in).

== Distribution and habitat ==
Halieutopsis stellifera is found in the Indian and Pacific Oceans where it has been recorded from Japan, the Philippines, Indonesia, Solomon Islands, Vanuatu, New Caledonia, Australia, the Western Indina Ocean between the Seychelles and the British Indian Ocean Territory and off Madagascar. This species has been found at depths between 410 and 1,372 m (1,345 and 4,501 ft), typically at depths of less than 1,000 m (3,300 ft).
