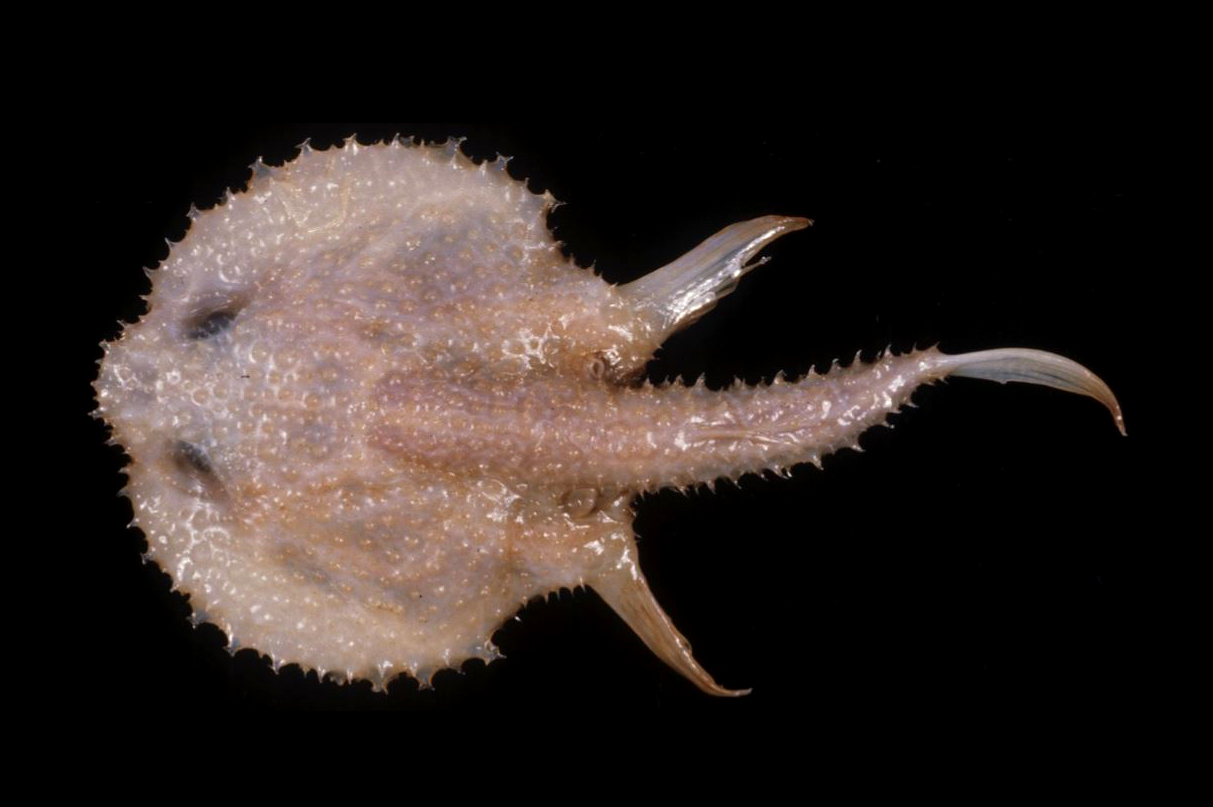

Conservation status
- Least Concern (IUCN 3.1)

Scientific classification
- Kingdom: Animalia
- Phylum: Chordata
- Class: Actinopterygii
- Division: Teleostei
- Order: Lophiiformes
- Family: Ogcocephalidae
- Genus: Halieutopsis
- Species: H. galatea

Binomial name
- Halieutopsis galatea Bradbury, 1988

= Halieutopsis galatea =

Species of fish

Halieutopsis galatea, the Galathea deepsea batfish, is a species of ray-finned fish belonging to the family Ogcocephalidae, the deep sea batfishes. This fish is found in the Indian Ocean.

== Taxonomy ==
Halieutopsis galatea was first formally described in 1988 by American ichthyologist Margaret G. Bradbury, with its type locality given as off Kenya in the Indian Ocean at 4°00'S, 41°27'E from a depth of 1,551 m (5,089 ft). The genus Halieutopsis is classified within the "Indo-Pacific clade" of the family Ogcocephalidae. The family Ogcocephalidae is classified in the monotypic suborder Ogcocephaloidei within the order Lophiiformes, the anglerfishes in the 5th edition of Fishes of the World.

== Etymology ==
Halieutopsis galatea has the generic name Halieutopsis, which suffixes opsis, meaning "looking like" to halieut, which is derived from halieutaea, Greek for an "angler" or "fisherman". This name is a reference to this genus' resemblance to the genus Halieutaea. The specific name galatea is the name of a sea nymph, but refers to the Danish research vessel Galathea, from which the type specimen was collected during the Danish Deep-Sea Expedition Round the World of 1950-1952.

== Description ==
The head and body of H. galatea is disk shaped and highly flattened and rounded, with a rostrum that just overhangs the mouth. The space between the eyes is relatively small. Tubercles cover the entire body, including the surface of the lower body, and smaller tubercles lie between the main tubercles, while the main tubercles on the snout and caudal peduncle are simple. Only the middle third of each jaw has teeth. The upper lobe of the esca is a flap and has two small cirri on its tip and two pairs of flaps on each side. The iilicial cavity is a deep north when viewed from the front. The fish has a well-developed subopercular spine. Its overall colour is pale greyish with a dusky network pattern on the upper body around the main tubercles. This species has a maximum published standard length of 5.5 cm (2.2 in).

== Distribution and habitat ==
Halieutopsis galatea is found in the eastern Indian Ocean, where it has been recorded from off Kenya, the Seychelles Bank and off Madagascar, and in the western Indian Ocean in the Timor Sea, with records from south of the Ashmore and Cartier Islands. Smaller specimens tend to be caught at much shallower depths, between 370 and 405 m (1,214 and 1,329 ft), than larger specimens, which have been taken from 880 to 1,551 m (2,887 to 5,089 ft); this may be because the adults are found in deeper areas than the juveniles.
