= Halieutopsis murrayi =

Scientific classification
- Kingdom: Animalia
- Phylum: Chordata
- Class: Actinopterygii
- Order: Lophiiformes
- Family: Ogcocephalidae
- Genus: Halieutopsis
- Species: H. murrayi

Binomial name
- Halieutopsis murrayi H. C. Ho, 2022

Species of fish

Halieutopsis murrayi, Murray's deepsea batfish, is a species of ray-finned fish belonging to the family Ogcocephalidae, the deep sea batfishes. This fish is found in the Western Indian Ocean and was first described to science in 2021 from a holotype collected in the 20th century.

== Taxonomy ==
Halieutopsis murrayi was first formally described in 2021 by the Taiwanese ichthyologist Ho "Hans" Hsuan-Ching based on a holotype originally deposited in the Natural History Museum, London with its type locality given as "sta. 184, Yemen, Gulf of Aden, Arabian Sea, 1270 m". The genus Halieutopsis is classified within the "Indo-Pacific clade" of the family Ogcocephalidae. The family Ogcocephalidae is classified in the monotypic suborder Ogcocephaloidei within the order Lophiiformes, the anglerfishes in the 5th edition of Fishes of the World.

== Etymology ==
Halieutopsis margaretae is a member of the genus Halieutopsis, an name which suffixes opsis, meaning "looking like" to halieut which is derived from halieutaea, Greek for an "angler" or "fisherman". This name is a reference to this genus' resemblance to the genus Halieutaea. The specific name honours the Scottish oceanographer John Murray, the holotype was collected on the John Murray Expedition, the name is to recognise the contribution he made to modern oceanography.

== Description ==
Halieutopsis murrayi has a head and body widened into a subtriangular disc, which has a greater length than its width. The rostrum is a wide, rounded shelf with sharp tubercles on it, these are three spined at its tip, which clearly overhangs the mouth. The Iillicial cavity is a little compressed with the opening being higher than it is wide. This cavity can be seen clearly in a view from above. The upper lobe of the esca is leaf-shaped and has small cirri on its tip and pair of small appendages at its base. The eyes are moderate in size. There are thin bands of bristle-like teeth on the jaws, those on the upper jaw are not visible when the mouth is closed. The main tubercles on the upper surface of the body are sharp and resemble needles, typically they have 5 or 6 facets. The tubercles along the edge of the disc are rather depressed at their bases, and have two spines at their tips. The tubercles on suboperculum are divided into four smaller spines, two of these are directed forwards and two are directed backwards, while those on the upper and lowersurfaces of the tail are simple and loosely arranged. The colour of the body is uniformly black. the standard length of the holotype is 48.7 mm (1.92 in).

== Distribution and habitat ==
Halieutopsis murrayi is known only from the holotype which was collected in the Gulf of Aden off Yemen as a depth of 1,270 m (4,170 ft).
