= Halieutopsis ingerorum =

Conservation status
- Least Concern (IUCN 3.1)

Scientific classification
- Kingdom: Animalia
- Phylum: Chordata
- Class: Actinopterygii
- Order: Lophiiformes
- Family: Ogcocephalidae
- Genus: Halieutopsis
- Species: H. ingerorum

Binomial name
- Halieutopsis ingerorum Bradbury, 1988

Species of fish

Halieutopsis ingerorum, Ingers' deepsea batfish, is a species of ray-finned fish belonging to the family Ogcocephalidae, the deep sea batfishes. This fish is found in the western Indian Ocean.

== Taxonomy ==
Halieutopsis ingerorum was first formally described in 1988 by the American ichthyologist Margaret G. Bradbury with its type locality given as the Mozambique Channel at 21°18'S, 36°18'E, from a depth between 1,510 and 1,600 m (4,950 and 5,250 ft). The genus Halieutopsis is classified within the "Indo-Pacific clade" of the family Ogcocephalidae. The family Ogcocephalidae is classified in the monotypic suborder Ogcocephaloidei within the order Lophiiformes, the anglerfishes in the 5th edition of Fishes of the World.

== Etymology ==
Halieutopsis ingerorum has the genus name Halieutopsis which suffixes opsis, meaning "looking like" to halieut which is derived from halieutaea, Greek for an "angler" or "fisherman". This name is a reference to this genus' resemblance to the genus Halieutaea. The specific name honours both the American herpetologist Robert F. Inger of the Field Museum of Natural History, and his first wife Mary Lee Inger who died in 1985, for the "friendship and wise counsel" they gave to Bradbury "through the years".

== Description ==
Halieutopsis ingerorum has 5 soft rays in the dorsal fin and 4 soft rays in the lappet like anal fin. The jaws in the narrow, nearly vertical mouth are short. There is a rather short, upwards pointing rostrum which is positioned as far back as the front edge of the eyes. The disc formed by the flattened head and body is oval in shape with the cranium raised above the rest of the disk. The tail is thin and tapers towards the caudal fin. The esca has lentil shaped lobes, with the upper lobe being folded and wrinkled. The illicial cavity is small and the esca protrudes slightly from the illicial opening. The upper part of the disk largely without tubercles The pectoral and pelvicfins are small and weak. This species has a maximum published standard length of 4.4 cm (1.7 in).

== Distribution and habitat ==
Halieutopsis ingerorum is apparentlyendemic to the western Indian Ocean where it has been collected from off South Africa, in the Mozambique Channel and off Madagascar. The specimens have been collected from depths between 1,300 and 1,600 m (4,300 and 5,200 ft). Records from the Western Pacific Ocean off Taiwan have been described as a separate species H. taiwanea.
