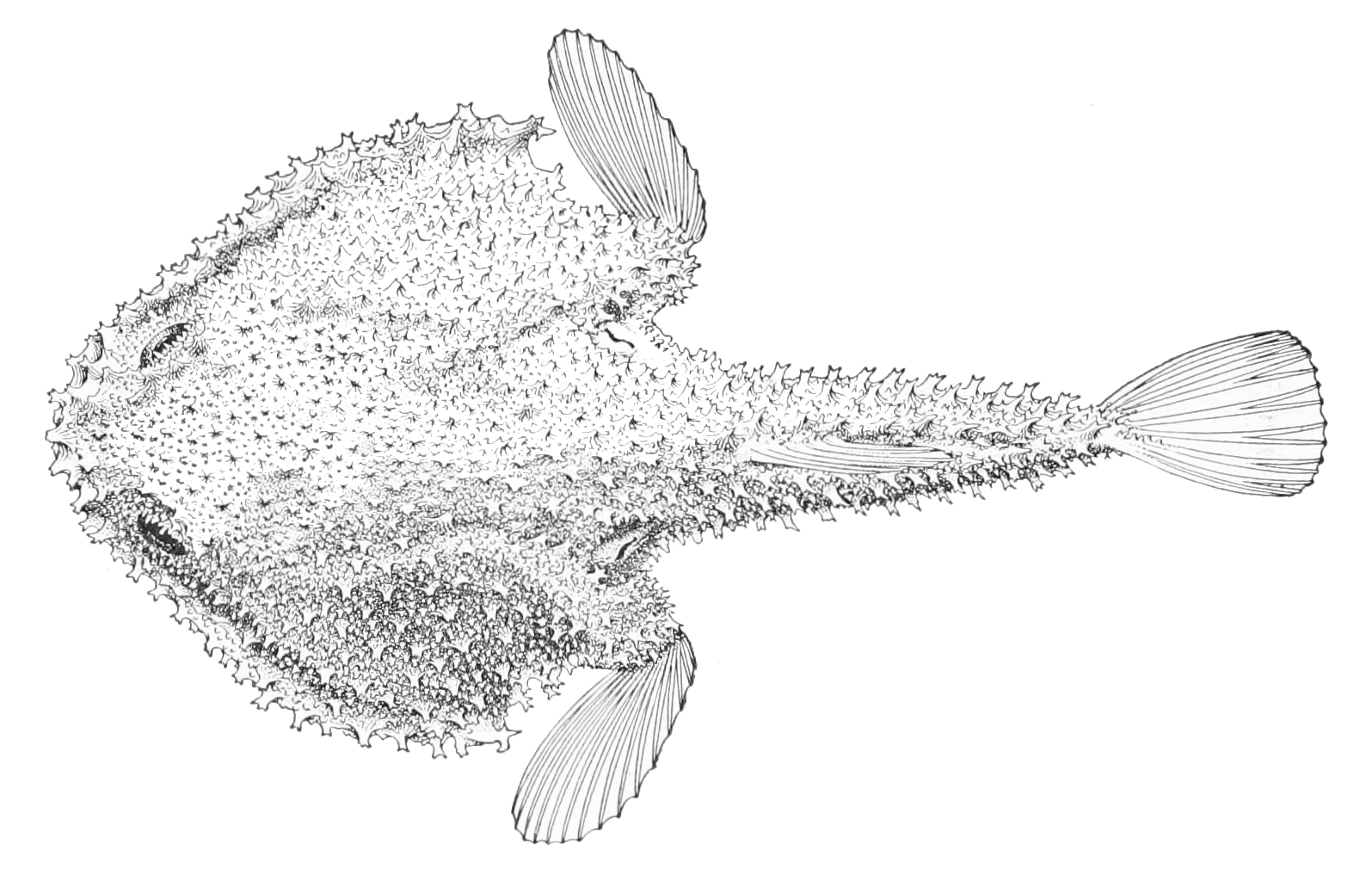
- Solocisquama erythrina

Scientific classification
- Kingdom: Animalia
- Phylum: Chordata
- Class: Actinopterygii
- Order: Lophiiformes
- Family: Ogcocephalidae
- Genus: Solocisquama; Bradbury, 1999

Type species
- Dibranchus stellulatus C. H. Gilbert, 1905

= Solocisquama =

Genus of fishes

Solocisquama is a genus of marine ray-finned fishes belonging to the family Ogcocephalidae, the deep sea batfishes. The species in this genus are benthic fishes found in deep waters in the Indian and Pacific Oceans.

== Taxonomy ==
Solocisquama was first proposed as a genus in 1999 by in 1980 by the American ichthyologist Margaret G. Bradbury with Dibranchus stellulatus as its type species. D. stellulatus was first formally described in 1905 by the Charles Henry Gilbert from off north coast of Maui in the Hawaiian Islands collected at Albatross station 4080 from a depth of 178–202 fathoms (1,068–1,212 ft; 326–369 m). This genus is classified within the "Eastern Pacific/Western Atlantic clade" of the family Ogcocephalidae. The family Ogcocephalidae is classified in the monotypic suborder Ogcocephaloidei within the order Lophiiformes, the anglerfishes in the 5th edition of Fishes of the World.

== Etymology ==
Solocisquama is a compound of solox, which means "coarse" or "bristly", with squama, meaning "scaled", an allusion to the scales having the form of spiny tubercles.

== Species ==
Solocisquama has three recognised species classified within it:

- Solocisquama carinata Bradbury, 1999
- Solocisquama erythrina (C. H. Gilbert, 1905) (Red roughscale batfish)
- Solocisquama stellulata (C. H. Gilbert, 1905) (Starry roughscale batfish)

== Characteritics ==
Solocisquama batfishes have a cleft in the upper jaw in the middle, a feature not present in any other genera in the Ogcocephalidae. The scales resemble tubercles rather than bucklers and have highly modified spines. The teeth on the fifth ceratobranchial are in small, clearly separated patches just meeting in the middle whereas those of Dibranchus are large and broadly joined. The illicium has processes on its sides towards the tip. The part of the lateral line on the tail starts to the rear of the anus. The body disc is triangular in shape, although if the limb line pelvic fins are folded against its rear edge it can be oval or bell shaped. The spines on the suboperculum are short, robust and have many points. The head is higher than the flattened body and they eyes are directed to the side and the front. The rostrum is made up of tubercles which are set close together creating a short shelf over the esca. In the type species the central tubercle of the rostrum has the middle tubercle much larger than those at the sides. The illicial cavity is small and the esca has an upper rather leaf-shaped lobe with a furrow down the middle and two roundish lower lobes. The largest species in the genus is S, erythrina which has a maximum published standard length of 13.6 cm (5.4 in) while the smallest is S. carinata with a maximum published standard length of 7.3 cm (2.9 in).

== Distribution and habitat ==
Solocisquama batfishes are found in the Indian and Pacific Oceans; S. carinata is known only from the Sala y Gomez ridge, S. erythrina is known from some scattered locations in the Pacific Ocean such as Western Australia, New South Wales, the Philippines, New Caledonia and Hawaii, while S. stellulata is known from the Western Indian Ocean off South Africa and Kenya, Japan, Taiwan, the Philippines and Hawaii. These are bathydemersal fishes found at depths from 750 m (2,460 ft) up to 900 m (3,000 ft).
