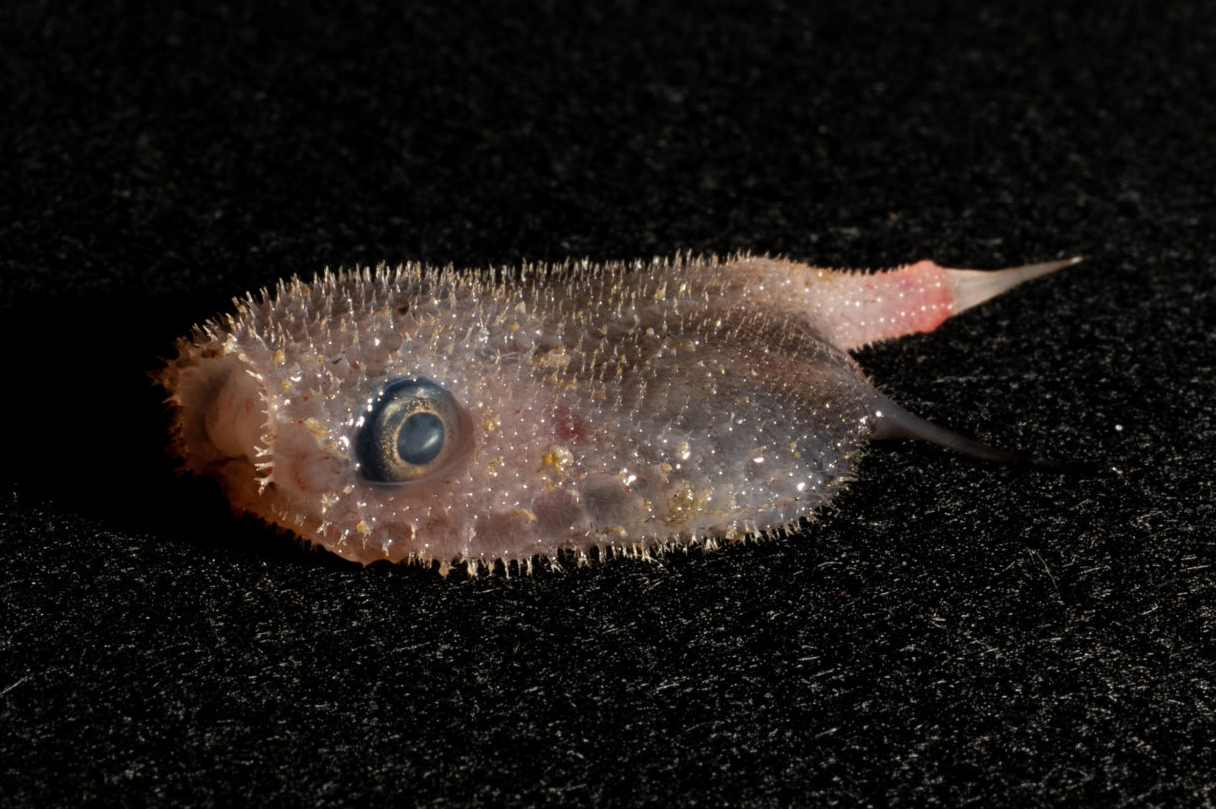

Conservation status
- Least Concern (IUCN 3.1)

Scientific classification
- Kingdom: Animalia
- Phylum: Chordata
- Class: Actinopterygii
- Order: Lophiiformes
- Family: Ogcocephalidae
- Genus: Halieutopsis
- Species: H. bathyoreos

Binomial name
- Halieutopsis bathyoreos Bradbury, 1988

= Halieutopsis bathyoreos =

Species of fish

Halieutopsis bathyoreos, broad-snout deepsea batfish, is a species of ray-finned fish belonging to the family Ogcocephalidae, the deep sea batfishes. This fish has a widespread distribution in deeper waters in the Indo-West Pacific region as far east as Hawaii.

== Taxonomy ==
Halieutopsis bathyoreos was first formally described in 1988 by the American ichthyologist Margaret G. Bradbury with its type locality given as the Central North Pacific, north of Johnston Atoll at 19°14.3'N, 169°07.3'W from a depth of 1,500 m (4,900 ft). The genus Halieutopsis is classified within the "Indo-Pacific clade" of the family Ogcocephalidae. The family Ogcocephalidae is classified in the monotypic suborder Ogcocephaloidei within the order Lophiiformes, the anglerfishes in the 5th edition of Fishes of the World.

== Etymology ==
Halieutopsis bathyoreos has the genus name Halieutopsis which suffixes opsis, meaning "looking like" to halieut which is derived from halieutaea, Greek for an "angler" or "fisherman". This name is a reference to this genus' resemblance to the genus Halieutaea. The specific name bathyoreos means "deep mountain", a reference to the Horizon Guyot, the type locality. This was the first batfish to be collected from a seamount.

== Description ==
Halieutopsis bathyoreos has 5 soft rays in the dorsal fin while the anal fin has 4 soft rays. The disc formed by the head and the body is almost triangular in shape and the illicial cavity and the esca can be seen clearly from a ventral view. The tubercles on the upper body have between 6 and 8 facets. The snout has a shelf-like for and extends beyond the mouth. The esca has a leaf-shaped dorsal lobe with a ventral cleavage and the illicial cavity is almost square in shape. There are no tubercles on the lower body. The shlf-like rostrum is a bony plate which extends beyond the mouth and slopes downwards with the illicial cavity and three-lobed esca clearly visible from below. The colour is uniform and is grey to dark grey. This species has a maximum published standard length of 6.7 cm (2.6 in).

== Distribution and habitat ==
Halieutopsis bathyoreos has a wide distribution in the Indian and Pacific Oceans. It has been recorded from off Madagascar, Tanzania, Papua New Guinea, New Caledonia, Vanuatu, Solomon Islands, Australia, New Zealand, and Japan, as well as in the central North Pacific from waters off Hawaii. In Australia the broad-snout deep sea batfish has been found off Christmas Island and the Cocos (Keeling) Islands, on the Northwest Shelf and from Newcastle, New South Wales south to Flinders Island. It has been found at depths between 800 and 2,000 m (2,600 and 6,600 ft), typically being collected from waters depths greater than 1,000 m (3,300 ft). This species lives in deep waters on the continental slope, including seamounts, undersea ridges and rises.

== Biology ==
Halieutopsis bathyoreos has a diet made up of smaller fishes, polychaetes, small crustaceans and molluscs.
