= Halieutopsis echinoderma =

Scientific classification
- Kingdom: Animalia
- Phylum: Chordata
- Class: Actinopterygii
- Order: Lophiiformes
- Family: Ogcocephalidae
- Genus: Halieutopsis
- Species: H. echinoderma

Binomial name
- Halieutopsis echinoderma H. C. Ho, 2021

Species of fish

Halieutopsis echinoderma, the spiny deepsea batfish, is a species of ray-finned fish belonging to the family Ogcocephalidae, the deep sea batfishes. This fish is found in the Western Pacific Ocean.

== Taxonomy ==
Halieutopsis bathyoreos was first formally described in 2021 by the Taiwanese ichthyologist Ho "Hans" Hsuan-Ching with its type locality given as the Daxi, Yilan, northeastern Taiwan from a depth of approximately 400 m (1,300 ft). The genus Halieutopsis is classified within the "Indo-Pacific clade" of the family Ogcocephalidae. The family Ogcocephalidae is classified in the monotypic suborder Ogcocephaloidei within the order Lophiiformes, the anglerfishes in the 5th edition of Fishes of the World.

== Etymology ==
Halieutopsis bathyoreos has the genus name Halieutopsis which suffixes opsis, meaning "looking like" to halieut which is derived from halieutaea, Greek for an "angler" or "fisherman". This name is a reference to this genus' resemblance to the genus Halieutaea. The specific name echinoderma means "spiny skin", possibly a reference to the spines between the main tubercles in the skin of this species.

== Description ==
Halieutopsis echinoderma has 4 or 5 soft rats, typically 4, in the dorsal fin and 4 soft rays in the anal fin. The head and body are flattened into a disc which is as wide as it is long and is comparatively long and wide. The snout consists of three enlarged tubercles with the largest being split into three nodes which are pointed upwards and outwards. The illicial cavity is as broad as it is high and can be seen when viewed from below. The upper lobe of the esca resembles a leaf and has two small cirri on its tip as well as 2 or 3, typically 3, pairs of small flaps along its side. The interorbital space is relatively broad compared to other species in the genus Halieutopsis. The main tubercles on the upper body are needle-like, the majority having 5 or 6 facets. The tubercles on the edges of the disc have two points while those on tail and lower body are simple and single pointed and those on subopercle are split into 4 short spines. The background colour of the body is black, with white blotches on the head, together with similar color patches on the main tubercles on the upper body and tail, these creating a rather vermiculate pattern. The surface of the loewre body is paler at the bases of the pelvic fins and on the belly, darker towards the head and paler around the anus. All the fins are darker in colour than the body, with the exception of the paler undersides of the pectoral fins. The published standard length varies from 45 to 74 mm (1.8 to 2.9 in).

== Distribution and habitat ==
Halieutopsis echinoderma is found in the Western Pacific Ocean including the type locality off Taiwan with other specimens being collected in the Coral Sea off the Gold Coast of Queensland, and in the Torres Strait to the east of Murray Island. The specimens have been collected from depths between 400 and 511 m (1,312 and 1,677 ft).
