= Halieutopsis margaretae =

Conservation status
- Least Concern (IUCN 3.1)

Scientific classification
- Kingdom: Animalia
- Phylum: Chordata
- Class: Actinopterygii
- Order: Lophiiformes
- Family: Ogcocephalidae
- Genus: Halieutopsis
- Species: H. margaretae

Binomial name
- Halieutopsis margaretae H. C. Ho & K. T. Shao, 2007

Species of fish

Halieutopsis margaretae, Margaret's deepsea batfish, is a species of ray-finned fish belonging to the family Ogcocephalidae, the deep sea batfishes. This fish is found in the Western Pacific Ocean.

== Taxonomy ==
Halieutopsis margaretae was first formally described in 2007 by the Taiwanese ichthyologists Ho "Hans" Hsuan-Ching and Shao Kwang-Tsao with the type locality given as eastern Taiwan, off Su-ao in the western North Pacific at, 24°29.00'N, 122°12.80'E from a depth of between 445 and 1,185 m (1,460 and 3,888 ft). The genus Halieutopsis is classified within the "Indo-Pacific clade" of the family Ogcocephalidae. The family Ogcocephalidae is classified in the monotypic suborder Ogcocephaloidei within the order Lophiiformes, the anglerfishes in the 5th edition of Fishes of the World.

== Etymology ==
Halieutopsis margaretae has the genus name Halieutopsis which suffixes opsis, meaning "looking like" to halieut which is derived from halieutaea, Greek for an "angler" or "fisherman". This name is a reference to this genus' resemblance to the genus Halieutaea. The specific name honours the American ichthyologist Margaret G. Bradbury of San Francisco State University, recognising her very important contribution to the study of deep sea batfishes.

== Description ==
Halieutopsis margaretae has between 4 and 6 soft rays in its dorsal fin. It is distinguished from other Halieutopsis species by the having bifurcate dermal spines on its upper surface; the upper surface the body part of the disc created by the flattened head and body is covered with complex tubercles. There are between 4 and 7 spines on the rostrum, the margins of the disc and the subopercle with a tubercles having three points on the tail. There are many lines equivalent to lateral line with sensory cells on various parts of the body. This species has a maximum published standard length of 6.3 cm (2.5 in).

== Distribution and habitat ==
Halieutopsis margaretae is found in the northern Western Pacific Ocean with specimens being collected from offJapan, Taiwan and Vanuatu. The collected specimens have been collected from depths of 44 to 1,220 m (144 to 4,003 ft).
