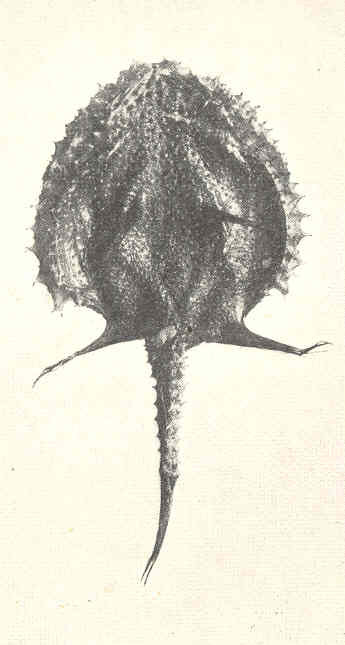

Conservation status
- Least Concern (IUCN 3.1)

Scientific classification
- Kingdom: Animalia
- Phylum: Chordata
- Class: Actinopterygii
- Order: Lophiiformes
- Family: Ogcocephalidae
- Genus: Halieutopsis
- Species: H. nasuta

Binomial name
- Halieutopsis nasuta (Alcock, 1891)

Synonyms
- Dibranchus nasutus Alcock, 1891; Halieutopsis vermicularis Smith & Radcliffe, 1912

= Halieutopsis nasuta =

Species of fish

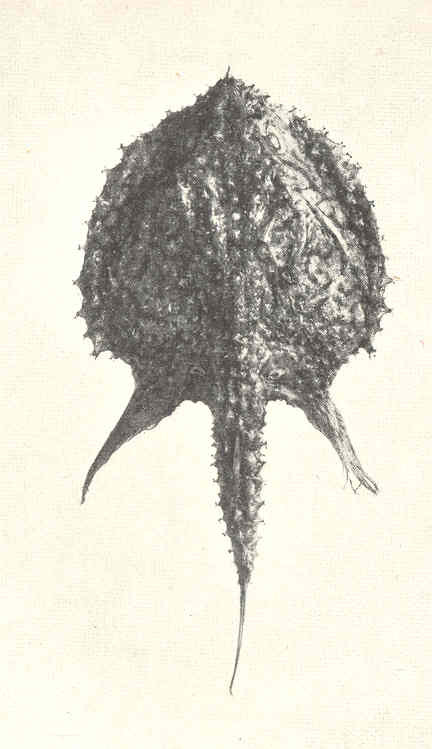
Dorsal view

Halieutopsis nasuta, the big-nosed deepsea batfish, is a species of ray-finned fish belonging to the family Ogcocephalidae, the deep sea batfishes. This fish is found in the Indian and Pacific Oceans. H. nasuta is classified within the genus Dibranchus by some authorities, but is generally considered to belong in the genus Halieutopsis.

== Taxonomy ==
Halieutopsis nasuta was first formally described as Dibranchus nasutus in 1891 by the British naturalist Alfred William Alcock with its type locality given as the Andaman Sea at 11°31'40"N, 92°46'40"E, i.e. Investigator station 115 at a depth of 188–220 fathoms (1,128–1,320 ft; 344–402 m). In 1999 Margaret G. Bradbury examined the remains of the type specimens of D. nasutus, which had largely disintegrated, and determined that they did not belong to Dibranchus. In 2021 Ho "Hans" Hsuan-Ching confirmed that this species should be classified in Halieutopsis and that H. vermicularis was a junior synonym of H. nasuta. The genus Halieutopsis is classified within the "Indo-Pacific clade" of the family Ogcocephalidae. The family Ogcocephalidae is classified in the monotypic suborder Ogcocephaloidei within the order Lophiiformes, the anglerfishes in the 5th edition of Fishes of the World.

== Etymology ==
Halieutopsis nasuta has the genus name Halieutopsis which suffixes opsis, meaning "looking like" to halieut which is derived from halieutaea, Greek for an "angler" or "fisherman". This name is a reference to this genus' resemblance to the genus Halieutaea. The specific name nasuta means "large-nosed", an allusion to "the broadly expanded snout-bones project far beyond the deep semicircular cavity which lies beneath them".

== Description ==
Halieutopsis nasutahas a flattened head and body, the front of the head is slightly higher than the body. The shape of the wide disk is subtriangular and is as wide as it is long. The rostrum is obtuse bony shelf well overhanging mouth, consists of three simple, enlarged, upward- and forward-directed tubercles (Figure 21A). The illicial cavity is deep with an opening that is as wide as it is high and is clearly visible from below. The esca has 3 lobes: a large dorsal lobe which resembles a leaf and has two small cirri on its tip and one or two pairs of small appendages at its base, with two of rounded lower lobes. The tubercles on the upper body are reasonably large in size, typicallu with between 5 and 8 facets> the tubercles on the edge of the disc are forked at their tips. The tubercles on the subopercle are split into 4 short spines. The tubercles on the upper and lower sides of the tail are simple, and never forked. The overall colour is black with a dark pattern of vermiculations while the margin of the disc and the lower body are jet black. The standard length of this species varies from 20.5 to 71.6 mm (0.81 to 2.82 in).

== Distribution and habitat ==
Halieutopsis nasuta is found in the tropical Indo-West Pacific being recorded from Indonesia, Philippines, Solomon Islands, New Caledonia, Vanuatu and Australia. It occurs at depths between 297 and 1,141 m (974 and 3,743 ft), mainly between 300 and 600 m (980 and 1,970 ft).
