= Halieutopsis kawaii =

Scientific classification
- Kingdom: Animalia
- Phylum: Chordata
- Class: Actinopterygii
- Order: Lophiiformes
- Family: Ogcocephalidae
- Genus: Halieutopsis
- Species: H. kawaii

Binomial name
- Halieutopsis kawaii H. C. Ho, 2021

Species of fish

Halieutopsis kawaii, Kawai's deepsea batfish, is a species of ray-finned fish belonging to the family Ogcocephalidae, the deep sea batfishes. This fish is found in the Western Pacific Ocean.

== Taxonomy ==
Halieutopsis kawaii was first formally described in 2021 by the Taiwanese ichthyologist Ho "Hans" Hsuan-Ching with its type locality given as the near Dongsha Atoll Pratas Island in the South China Sea at 20°44'42.4"N, 117°39'13.8"E from a depth of between 1,150 and 1,908 m (3,773 and 6,260 ft). The genus Halieutopsis is classified within the "Indo-Pacific clade" of the family Ogcocephalidae. The family Ogcocephalidae is classified in the monotypic suborder Ogcocephaloidei within the order Lophiiformes, the anglerfishes in the 5th edition of Fishes of the World.

== Etymology ==
Halieutopsis kawaii has the genus name Halieutopsis which suffixes opsis, meaning "looking like" to halieut which is derived from halieutaea, Greek for an "angler" or "fisherman". This name is a reference to this genus' resemblance to the genus Halieutaea. The specific name honours Ho's friend, Dr Toshio Kawai of Hokkaido University, who collected the paratypes of this species and made them available for Ho to study.

== Description ==
Halieutopsis kawaii has a uniformly dark brown body which is covered by simple tubercles on its upper surface and comparatively fewer rather sparse and scattered tubercles on lower surface. There are no small tubercles interspersed among the tubercles on either surface of body. The main tubercle on the rostrum is simple, having a broad base which bears several spinules. The main tubercles on the tail are simple, never with more than one spine. The upper lobe of the esca has a pair of cirri on its tip and two or three pairs of small flaps on the side. The eyes are large, with a diameter equivalent to 11.6–14.0%, with a mean of 12.7%, of the standard length and they are separated by a narrow space between them. The standard lengths of the studied specimens of this species vary from 372 to 83.6 mm (14.65 to 3.29 in).

== Distribution and habitat ==
Halieutopsis kawaii is found in the Western Pacific Ocean where it has been recorded from the South China Sea southwest of Taiwan and from the eastern Indian Ocean off Indonesia. The known specimens were obtained from depths between 735 and 1,908 m (2,411 and 6,260 ft).
