= Halieutopsis okamurai =

Scientific classification
- Kingdom: Animalia
- Phylum: Chordata
- Class: Actinopterygii
- Order: Lophiiformes
- Family: Ogcocephalidae
- Genus: Halieutopsis
- Species: H. okamurai

Binomial name
- Halieutopsis okamurai H. C. Ho, 2021

Species of fish

Halieutopsis okamurai, Okamura's deepsea batfish, is a little known species of marine ray-finned fish belonging to the family Ogcocephalidae, the deep sea batfishes. This species is found in the northwestern Pacific Ocean, and is known only from a single specimen collected between the Ogasawara Islands and Izu islands in 1968.

== Taxonomy ==
Halieutopsis okamurai was first formally described in 2021 by the Taiwanese ichthyologist Ho "Hans" Hsuan-Ching with its type locality given as Ogasawara Islands of Japan in the northwestern Pacific at 30°39.4'N, 140°36.8'E from a depth of 1,950 m (6,400 ft). The genus Halieutopsis is classified within the "Indo-Pacific clade" of the family Ogcocephalidae. The family Ogcocephalidae is classified in the monotypic suborder Ogcocephaloidei within the order Lophiiformes, the anglerfishes in the 5th edition of Fishes of the World.

== Etymology ==
Halieutopsis okamurai has the genus name Halieutopsis which suffixes opsis, meaning "looking like" to halieut which is derived from halieutaea, Greek for an "angler" or "fisherman". This name is a reference to this genus' resemblance to the genus Halieutaea. The specific name okamurai honours Osamu Okamura of Kōchi University, who collected holotype in 1968, and also in recognition of his contribution to the study of deep-sea fishes, particularly the Gadiformes.

== Description ==
Halieutopsis okamurai has the head and body flattened into an oval disc with a length that is slightly greater than its width. The disc is truncated at its front edge, an in comparison to congeners it is rather short and narrow. The cranium is slightly elevated above surface of disc, the rostrum is a short, triangular shelf, only slightly overhanging the mouth and the tubercle on the tip of the rostrum is short and blunt with some small spines at its base. The illicial cavity is broad, its opening is broader than it is high and it is just visible when viewed from below. The esca has an upper lobe which is leaf-shaped and which has a pair of cirri on its front and a pair of flaps to the rear. The eyes are very small, the smallest in the genus. The mouth has bristle-like teeth arranged in slender bands in both jaws, those in the upper jaw are not visible when the mouth is closed. The small pelvic fins are covered in relatively thick skin. The moderately sized main tubercles typically have 5 or 6 facets. The tubercles on the edge of the disc have two points at their tips while those on subopercle have 4 points, there are no tubercles on the lower body except for afew at the bases of the pelvic fins. The tail has a dense covering of unforked tubercles, except that those associated with the lateral line are forked. The holotype has a standard lengths of 65 cm (26 in). The holotype' colour in life is unknown but it has a uniform creamy colour in preservation.

== Distribution and habitat ==
Halieutopsis okamurai is known only from the holotype which was collected on 3 December 1968 between the Ogasawara Islands and Izu Islands of Japan in the northwestern Pacific Ocean from a depth of 1,950 m (6,400 ft).
