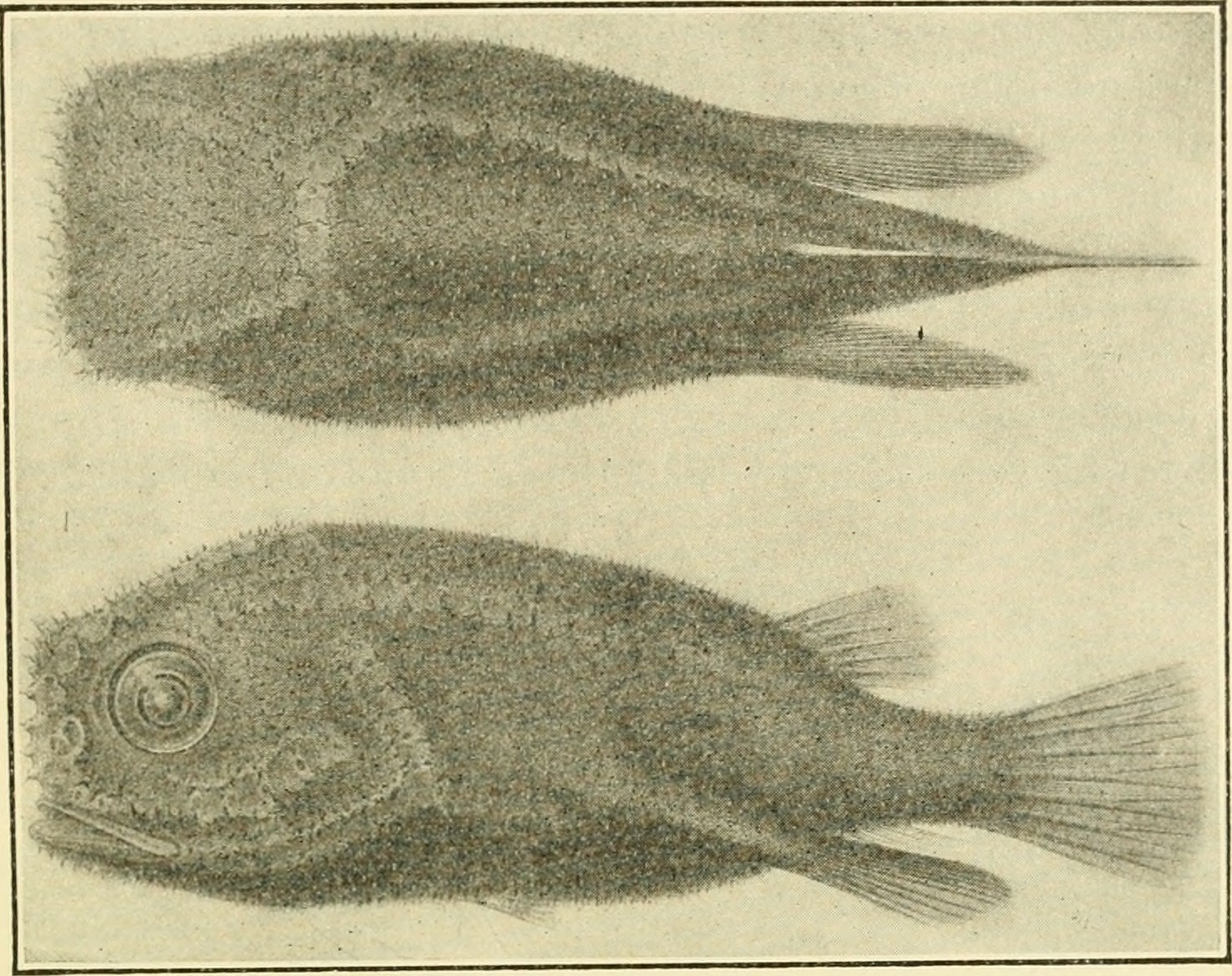
- Coelophrys brevicaudata illustration, top and side view

Scientific classification
- Kingdom: Animalia
- Phylum: Chordata
- Class: Actinopterygii
- Order: Lophiiformes
- Family: Ogcocephalidae
- Genus: Coelophrys; A. B. Brauer, 1902

Type species
- Coelophrys brevicaudata A. B. Brauer, 1902

= Coelophrys =

Genus of fishes

Coelophrys is a genus of marine ray-finned fishes belonging to the family Ogcocephalidae, the deep-sea batfishes or sea bats. The fishes in this genus are found in the western Pacific Ocean and the Indian Ocean.

== Taxonomy ==
Coelophrys was first proposed as a monospecific genus in 1902 by the German zoologist August Brauer when he described Coelophrys brevicaudata. The type locality of C. brevicaudata was given as in the eastern Indian Ocean around 50 km (31 mi) west of Leupung, Aceh Besar Regency at 5°23'02"N, 94°48'01"E, from a depth of 1,024 m (3,360 ft) at Valdivia station 207. This genus is classified within the "Indo-Pacific clade" of the family Ogcocephalidae. The family Ogcocephalidae is classified in the monotypic suborder Ogcocephaloidei within the order Lophiiformes, the anglerfishes in the 5th edition of Fishes of the World.

== Etymology ==
Coelophrys combines coelo, meaning "hollow", and phrys, meaning "brow", a reference to the depression on the forehead of C. brevicaudata where the lure or illicium is rested when not in use.

== Species ==
There are currently seven recognized species in this genus:

- Coelophrys arca H. M. Smith & Radcliffe, 1912
- Coelophrys bradburyae Endo & G. Shinohara, 1999
- Coelophrys brevicaudata A. B. Brauer, 1902
- Coelophrys brevipes H. M. Smith & Radcliffe, 1912
- Coelophrys micropa Alcock, 1891
- Coelophrys mollis H. M. Smith & Radcliffe, 1912
- Coelophrys oblonga H. M. Smith & Radcliffe, 1912

Many authorities treat C. oblonga as a member of the genus Halieutopsis.

== Characteristics ==
Coelophrys batfishes are characterised by having a rather box-like head that is not vertically flattened, a very short caudal peduncle and a large mouth. The cavity on the forehead that the illicium folds into is very large and spacious. The esca has 2 lobes to the side and a middle part which is slender and leaf-shaped. There is no skin over the eye. The pelvic fin does not have an elbow. There are no teeth on the roof of the mouth and very few, or none, on the tongue. The scales are simple tubercles and the lateral line is divided. There is no spine on the preoperculum. These are small fishes: The largest species in the genus is C. micropa, which has a maximum published total length of 8.4 cm (3.3 in).

== Distribution and habitat ==
Coelophrys batfishes are found in the Western Pacific Ocean in deep water between 423 and at least 1400m. These batfishes, as adults, have a morphology similar to the pelagic larvae of other anglerfish species; this, along with the reduced pectoral and pelvic fins, implies that these are pelagic rather than demersal fishes.
