= Coelophrys bradburyae =

Conservation status
- Data Deficient (IUCN 3.1)

Scientific classification
- Kingdom: Animalia
- Phylum: Chordata
- Class: Actinopterygii
- Order: Lophiiformes
- Family: Ogcocephalidae
- Genus: Coelophrys
- Species: C. bradburyae

Binomial name
- Coelophrys bradburyae Endo & G. Shinohara, 1999

Species of fish

Coelophrys bradburyae is a species of marine ray-finned fish belonging to the family Ogcocephalidae, the deep sea batfishes. This species is found in the Western Pacific Ocean in deep waters off Japan. This species of batfish is little known and only two specimens have been collected, one in 1995 and the other more recently. Given the paucity of data on this species' biology and distribution the IUCN has assessed its conservation status to be data deficient.

== Taxonomy ==
Coelophrys bradburyae was first formally described in 1999 by the Japanese biologists Hiromitsu Endo and Gento Shinohara with its type locality given as off Hachinohe in the Aomori Prefecture of Honshu at 40°8.91'N, 142°15.42'E to 40°5.18'N, 142°13.49'E from a depth of 557–595 m (1,827–1,952 ft). The genus Coelophrys is classified within the "Indo-Pacific clade" of the family Ogcocephalidae. The family Ogcocephalidae is classified in the monotypic suborder Ogcocephaloidei within the order Lophiiformes, the anglerfishes in the 5th edition of Fishes of the World.

== Etymology ==
Coelophrys bradburyae is classified in the genus Coelophrys, a name combining coelo, meaning "hollow", and phrys, meaning "brow", a reference to the depression on the forehead of C. brevicaudata where the lure or illicium is rested when not in use. The specific name honours the American ichthyologist Margaret G. Bradbury of San Francisco State Universityin recognition of her important contributions to the knowledge of the taxonomy of the Ogcocephalidae.

== Description ==
Coelophrys bradburyae has a rather box-like head which is not vertically flattened, a very short caudal peduncle and a large mouth. The illicial cavity on the forehead which the illicium folds into us very large and spacious. The esca has 2 lobes to teg side and a middle part which is slender and leaf-shaped. there is no skin over the eye. The pelvic fin does not have an elbow. There are no teeth on the roof of the mouth and very few, or none, on the tongue. The scales are simple tubercles and the lateral line is divided. There is no spine on the preoperculum. It differs from the other species in its genus by its small eyes, short upper jaw, the relatively small size of its illicial cavity, having short pectoral and pelvic fins and the lack of two spines tubercleson the flanks. This species has a maximum published total length of 5.8 cm (2.3 in).

== Distribution and habitat ==
Coelophrys bradburyae is known only from two nearby locations on the Northwestern Pacific Ocean off the eastern coast of Honshu, Japan. These are Hachinohe, the type locality, and Tokyo Bay. It is a bathydemersal species which has been collected from depths of 550 to 590 m (1,800 to 1,940 ft) on the continental margin.

== Conservation status ==
Coelophrys bradburyae is a deep-living species which is only known from two specimens collected from the two localities described above, the holotype in 1995 and a second specimen has been collected since then. Its distribution, population, ecology and potential threats are little known and the International Union for Conservation of Naturehasclassified its conservation status as data deficient.
