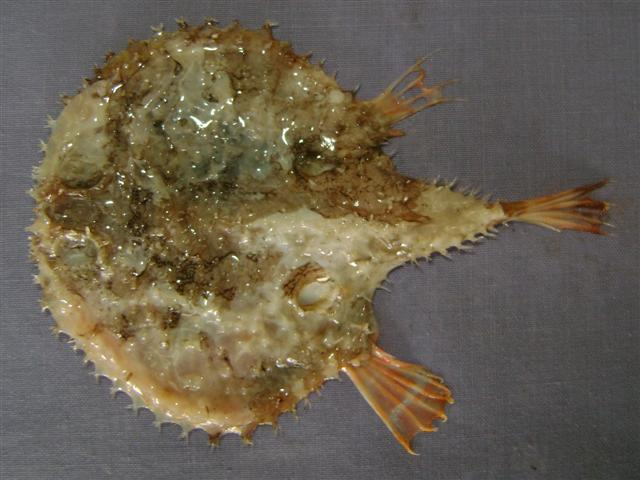

Conservation status
- Least Concern (IUCN 3.1)

Scientific classification
- Kingdom: Animalia
- Phylum: Chordata
- Class: Actinopterygii
- Order: Lophiiformes
- Family: Ogcocephalidae
- Genus: Halieutaea
- Species: H. indica

Binomial name
- Halieutaea indica Annandale & J. T. Jenkins, 1910

Synonyms
- Lophius faujas Lacépède, 1798; Lophius muricatus Shaw, 1804; Astrocanthus stellatus Swainson, 1839; Halieutaea sinica Tchang & Chang, 1964; Halieutea spicata J. L. B. Smith, 1965; Halieutaea spicata J. L. B. Smith, 1965

= Halieutaea indica =

Species of fish

Halieutaea indica, the Indian batfish, Indian handfish or Indian seabat, is a species of marine ray-finned fish belonging to the family Ogcocephalidae, the deep sea batfishes. The Indian batfish has a wide Indo-West Pacific distribution.

== Taxonomy ==
Halieutaea indica was first formally described in 1910 by the British naturalists Nelson Annandale and James Travis Jenkins with the type locality given as the Bay of Bengal off the coast of Orissa in India. The genus Halieutaea is the sister group to the other two clades, the Indo-Pacific clade and the Eastern Pacific and Western Atlantic clade, of the family Ogcocephalidae. The family Ogcocephalidae is classified in the monotypic suborder Ogcocephaloidei within the order Lophiiformes, the anglerfishes in the 5th edition of Fishes of the World.

== Etymology ==
Halieutaea indica has the genus name Halieutaea which is Greek for "angler" or "fishermam", a reference to the habit of these fishes of resting on the bottom and using their lures to attract prey towards them. The specific name, indica, means "Indian", referring to the type locality.

== Description ==
Halieutaea indica has a disc shaped body which is circular and which is almost equally wide as it is long. The snout may just extend past the edge of the disc. There are 2 paddle shaped paddles of teeth on the tongue. The upper body is covered with medium-sized onee or two pointed tubercles with no enlarged granular tubercles on the sides of the tail. The lower body is naked or has many widely spaced granular spinules. The dorsal and anal fins each have 4 soft rays. The overall colour is pinkish to brownish yellow with a reddish ventral side. The pectoral fins are orange with a white bar running across them and there are 2 brownish bars on the caudal fin. The Indian seabat has a maximum published total length of 15 cm (5.9 in).

== Distribution and habitat ==
Halieutaea indica has a wide Indo-West Pacific distribution. It is found from eastern Africa from the Gulf of Aden south to South Africa, east through the Indian Ocean, including Madagascar and the Seychelles, into the Pacific Ocean, north to southern Japan and south to Australia. In Australia it is found at the Cocos (Keeling) Islands and off Western Australia and the Northern Territory. It is a demersal fish which occurs on muddy substrates on the continental shelf and upper continental margin at depths between 20 and 500 m (66 and 1,640 ft).
