= Halieutopsis taiwanea =

Scientific classification
- Kingdom: Animalia
- Phylum: Chordata
- Class: Actinopterygii
- Order: Lophiiformes
- Family: Ogcocephalidae
- Genus: Halieutopsis
- Species: H. taiwanea

Binomial name
- Halieutopsis taiwanea H. C. Ho, 2021

Species of fish

Halieutopsis taiwanea, the Taiwan deepsea batfish, is a species of marine ray-finned fish belonging to the family Ogcocephalidae, the deep sea batfishes. This species is found in the northwestern Pacific Ocean off Taiwan.

== Taxonomy ==
Halieutopsis taiwanea was first formally described in 2021 by the Taiwanese ichthyologist Ho "Hans" Hsuan-Ching with its type locality given as off Yilan, northeastern Taiwan 24°16'12"N, 122°11'24"E from a depth of between 2,246 and 2,356 m (7,369 and 7,730 ft). In 2007 the specimens that were used to describe this species were thought to be of H. ingerorum but in 2021 Ho recognised that these Taiwanese specimens had different proportions to and were caught in deeper water than the Western Indian Ocean H. ingerorum and described this new species. The genus Halieutopsis is classified within the "Indo-Pacific clade" of the family Ogcocephalidae. The family Ogcocephalidae is classified in the monotypic suborder Ogcocephaloidei within the order Lophiiformes, the anglerfishes in the 5th edition of Fishes of the World.

== Etymology ==
Halieutopsis taiwanea has the genus name Halieutopsis which suffixes opsis, meaning "looking like" to halieut which is derived from halieutaea, Greek for an "angler" or "fisherman". This name is a reference to this genus' resemblance to the genus Halieutaea. The specific name taiwanea refers to the type locality being off Taiwan.

== Description ==
Halieutopsis taiwanea is separable from other species in the genus Halieutopsus by having a face that is strongly upturned with a very short, upwardly-directed rostrum over a small mouth and jaw. The most similar species is H. ingerorum from which it is distinguished by its relatively smaller skull, comparatively shorter disk margin, smaller mouth, upper jaw length and its relatively longer tail (44.6–50.1% SL). It also differs in some measurements including the length from the tip of the snout to the origin of the dorsal fin and from the tip of the upper jaw to the anus. The three specimens collected varied in standard length between 67.5 and 78.3 mm (2.66 and 3.08 in).

== Distribution and habiata ==
Halieutopsis taiwanea is known only from the three specimens collected off northeastern Taiwan at depths between2,246 and 2,356 m (7,369 and 7,730 ft).
