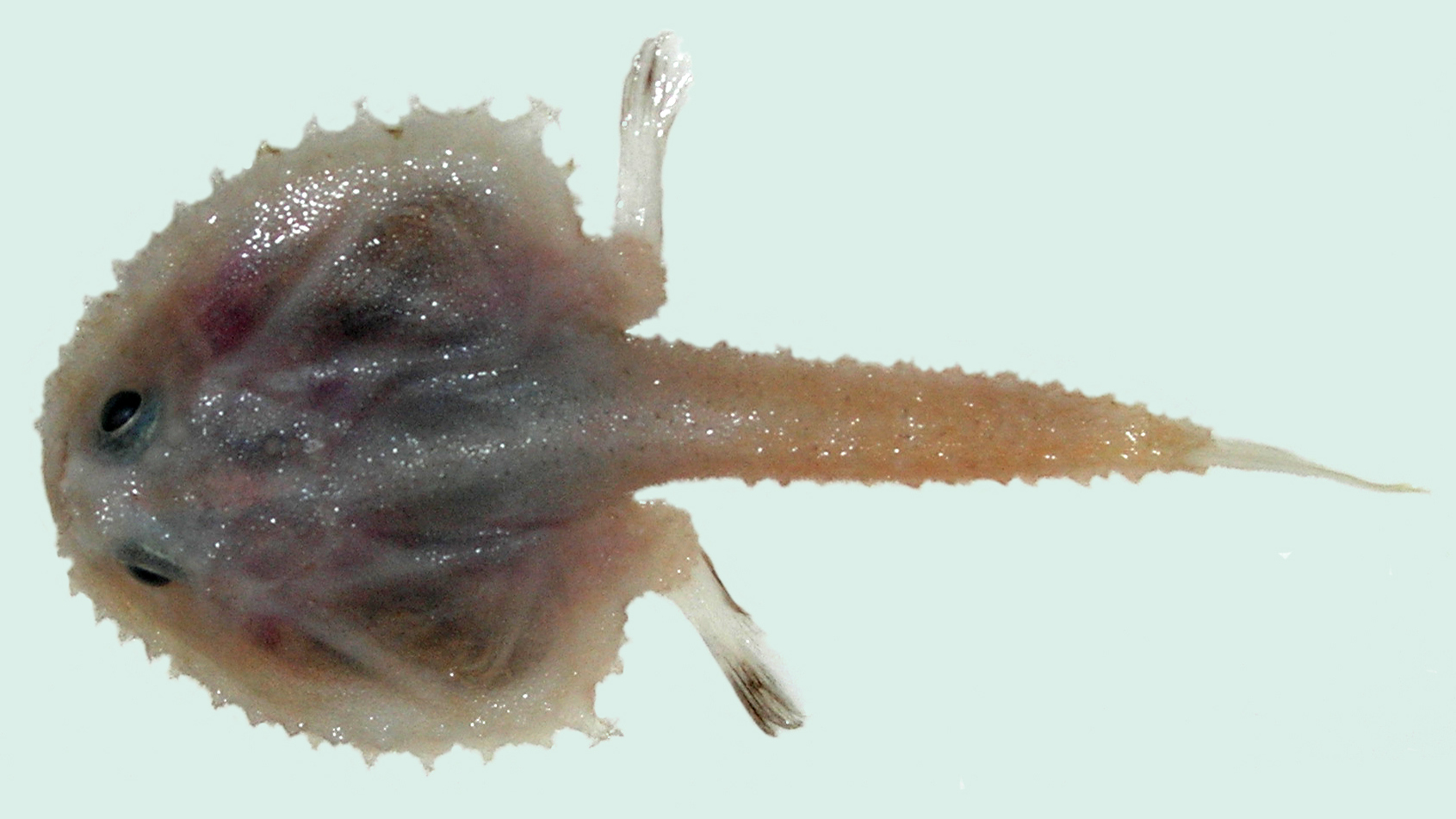
- Halicmetus ruber

Scientific classification
- Kingdom: Animalia
- Phylum: Chordata
- Class: Actinopterygii
- Order: Lophiiformes
- Family: Ogcocephalidae
- Genus: Halicmetus; Alcock, 1891

Type species
- Halicmetus ruber Alcock, 1891

= Halicmetus =

Genus of fishes

Halicmetus is a genus of marine ray-finned fishes belonging to the family Ogcocephalidae, the deep sea batfishes. The fishes in this genus are widely distributed in the Indian and Western Pacific Oceans.

== Taxonomy ==
Halicmetus was first proposed as a monospecific genus in 1891 by the British physician and zoologist Alfred William Alcock when he described Halicmetus ruber. The type locality of H. ruber was given as the Andaman Sea at 11°31'40"N, 92°46'06"E at a depth of 188–220 fathoms (1,128–1,320 ft; 344–402 m), the Investigator station 115. This genus is classified within the "Indo-Pacific clade" of the family Ogcocephalidae. The family Ogcocephalidae is classified in the monotypic suborder Ogcocephaloidei within the order Lophiiformes, the anglerfishes in the 5th edition of Fishes of the World.

== Species ==
Halicmetus contains eight recognised species:

- Halicmetus drypus Ho & Last, 2018 (Pink shortnose seabat)
- Halicmetus granulosus Ho, 2022
- Halicmetus niger Ho, Endo & Sakamaki, 2008 (Black shortnose seabat)
- Halicmetus marmoratus Weber, 1913 (Marbled shortnose seabat)
- Halicmetus odysseus Prokofiev, 2020
- Halicmetus reticulatus H. M. Smith & Radcliffe, 1912 (Marbled seabat or reticulated shortnose seabat)
- Halicmetus ruber Alcock, 1891 (Red shortnose seabat)
- Halicmetus westraliensis Ho & Last, 2018 (West Australian shortnose seabat)

== Characteristics ==
Halicmetus seabats are characterised by their very flattened heads with the front edge of the head being either broadly rounded or squared off. The snout extends out over the small mouth and the front edge of the disc of the head. The dorsal fin is either tiny or is not present. The whole body is covered in scales developed into small bucklers and small tubercles. The subopercular buckler is moderately well developed and has some small terminal spinules. The second and third gill arches have gill filaments; the fourth does not. Gill rakers are found on the first to third gill arches. The esca, or lure, is bulbous and triangular with a fringe on its lower edge and typically has a pair of cirri on its upper surface The teeth on the vomer and palate are arranged in three neighbouring quadrangular patches and those on the tongue in two joined and elongated patches. These fishes are no longer than 9 cm (3.5 in) in length.

== Distribution and habitat ==
Halicmetus seabats are found in the Indian and Western Pacific Oceans, as far west as northern Madagascar, north to Japan, south to Australia and east as far as New Caledonia. These are bathydemersal fishes found at depths between 280 and 1,000 m (920 and 3,280 ft).
