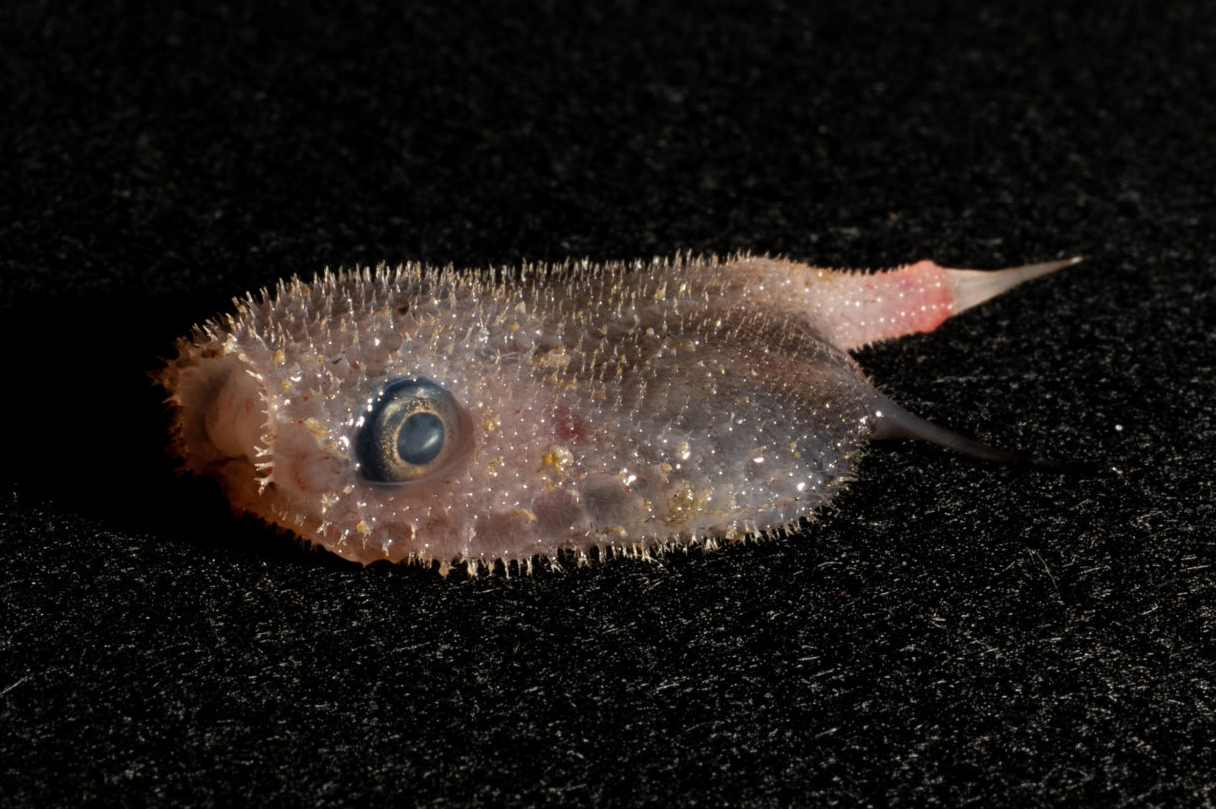
- A Broad-snout deepsea batfish (Halieutopsis bathyoreos) from off Christmas Island in the eastern Indian Ocean, July 2021

Scientific classification
- Kingdom: Animalia
- Phylum: Chordata
- Class: Actinopterygii
- Order: Lophiiformes
- Family: Ogcocephalidae
- Genus: Halieutopsis; Garman, 1899

Type species
- Halieutopsis tumifrons Garman, 1899

= Halieutopsis =

Genus of fishes

Halieutopsis is a genus of marine ray-finned fishes belonging to the family Ogcocephalidae, the deep sea batfishes. The species in this genus are found in the Indian and Pacific Oceans.

== Taxonomy ==
Halieutopsis was first proposed as a monospecific genus in 1899 by the American zoologist Samuel Garman when he described, giving its type locality given as off the Galapagos Islands. This genus is classified within the "Indo-Pacific clade" of the family Ogcocephalidae. The family Ogcocephalidae is classified in the monotypic suborder Ogcocephaloidei within the order Lophiiformes, the anglerfishes in the 5th edition of Fishes of the World.

== Etymology ==
Halieutopsis suffixes opsis, meaning "looking like" to halieut which is derived from halieutaea, Greek for an "angler" or "fisherman". This name is a reference to this genus' resemblance to the genus Halieutaea.

== Species ==
There are currently seventeen recognized species in this genus:

- Halieutopsis andriashevi Bradbury, 1988 (Andriashev's deepsea batfish)
- Halieutopsis bathyoreos Bradbury, 1988 (Broad-snout deepsea batfish)
- Halieutopsis echinoderma H. C. Ho, 2021 (Spiny deepsea batfish)
- Halieutopsis galatea Bradbury, 1988 (Galathea deepsea batfish)
- Halieutopsis ingerorum Bradbury, 1988 (Ingers’ deepsea batfish)
- Halieutopsis kawaii H. C. Ho, 2021 (Kawai's deepsea batfish)
- Halieutopsis margaretae H. C. Ho & K. T. Shao, 2007 (Margaret's deepsea batfish)
- Halieutopsis murrayi H. C. Ho, 2021 (Murray's deepsea batfish)
- Halieutopsis nasuta (Alcock, 1891) (Big-nosed deepsea batfish)
- Halieutopsis nudiventer (Lloyd, 1909) (Naked-belly deepsea batfish)
- Halieutopsis oblonga (H. M. Smith & Radcliffe, 1912) (Oblong deepsea batfish)
- Halieutopsis okamurai H. C. Ho, 2021 (Okamura's deepsea batfish)
- Halieutopsis simula H. M. Smith & Radcliffe, 1912 (Fluffy-esca deepsea batfish)
- Halieutopsis stellifera H. M. Smith & Radcliffe, 1912 (Starry deepsea batfish)
- Halieutopsis taiwanea H. C. Ho, 2021 (Taiwan deepsea batfish)
- Halieutopsis tumifrons Garman, 1899 (Truncate-snout deepsea batfish)
- Halieutopsis vermicularis H. M. Smith & Radcliffe, 1912

Many authorities treat H. vermicularis as a synonym of H. nasuta.

== Characteristics ==
Halieutopsis are distinguished from other Ogcocephaline genera by having no gill filaments on the third and fourth gill arches with teeth typically being found on the fifth ceratobranchial, where they are divided into two well separated, small patches. The illicium is relatively simple and resembles a spine and doe not have a cavity at its base. The esca has two large lateral lobes and a dorsal, middle lobe which typically has cirrhi or skin flaps. The base of the pectoral fin are widely connected to the body. The lateral line is broken, with the part towards the tail runs along the lower body and reaches to just in front of or past the anus with between one and six neuromasts on each side of the anus. The batfishes in this genus are relatively small, typically having standard length of less than 100 mm (3.9 in), with the largest species being H. nasuta with a maximum published total length of 140 mm (5.5 in).

== Distribution and habitat ==
Halieutopsis batfishes are found in the Indian Ocean and the western and eastern Pacific Oceans in temperate to tropical regions on continental shelves, slopes, and in deeper waters of the Indo-Pacific at depths of between approximately 100 and 4,020 m (330 and 13,190 ft).
