= Starry handfish =

- At Numazu Deep Sea Aquarium in Japan

Conservation status
- Least Concern (IUCN 3.1)

Scientific classification
- Kingdom: Animalia
- Phylum: Chordata
- Class: Actinopterygii
- Division: Teleostei
- Order: Lophiiformes
- Family: Ogcocephalidae
- Genus: Halieutaea
- Species: H. stellata

Binomial name
- Halieutaea stellata (Vahl, 1797)

Synonyms
- Lophius stellatus Vahl, 1797; Halieutaea maoria Powell, 1937

Species of fish

The starry handfish (Halieutaea stellata), starry seabat or minipizza batfish, is species of marine ray-finned fish belonging to the family Ogcocephalidae, the deep-sea batfishes or seabats. This fish is found on the continental shelves of the Indo-Pacific oceans at depths of between 50 and 400 m. They are up to 30 cm long.

== Taxonomy ==
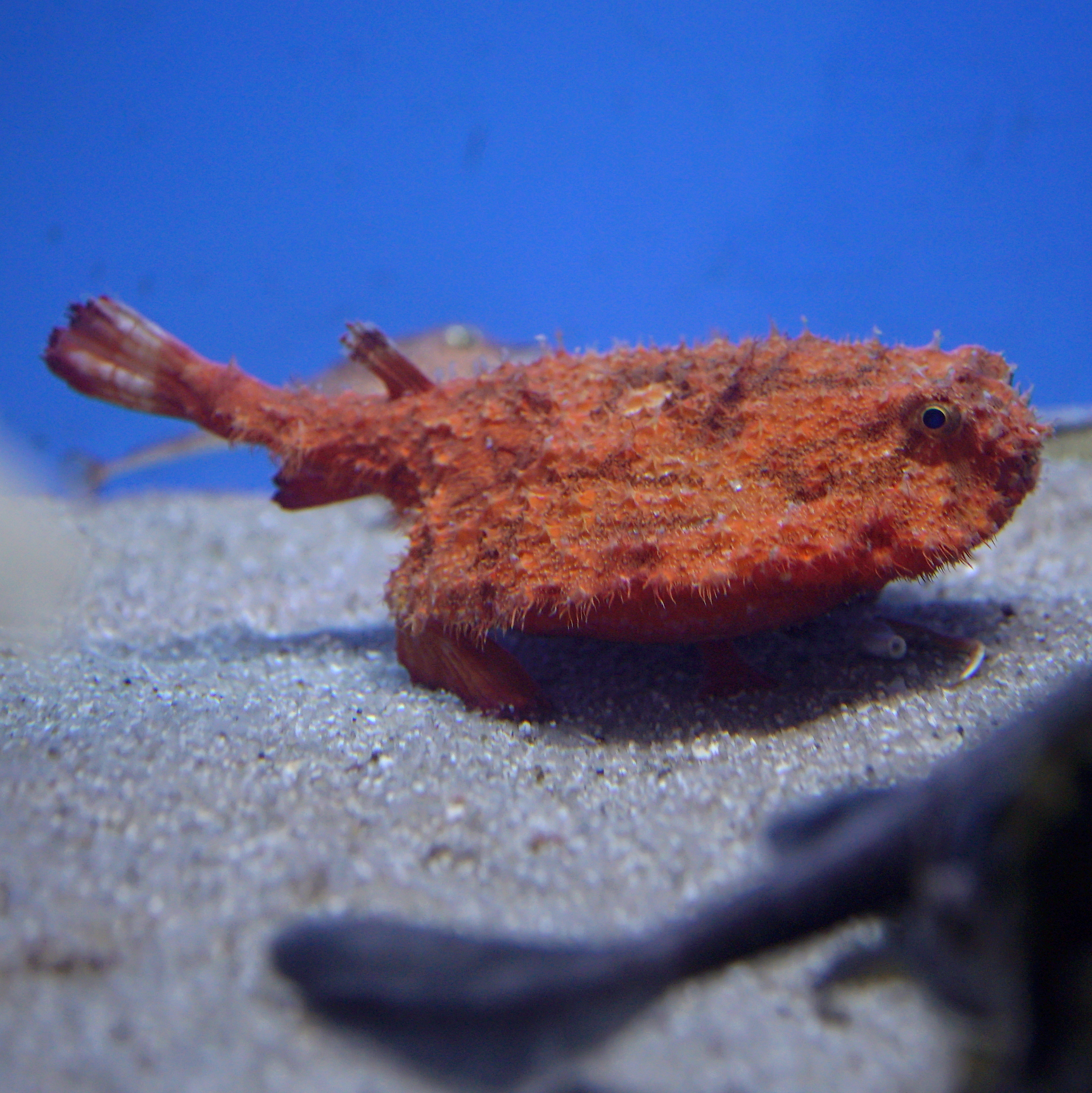
At Takeshima Aquarium in Aichi, Japan

The starry handfish was first formally described as Lophius stellatus in 1797 by the Norwegian zoologist Martin Vahl with its type locality given as China. In 1827 Achille Valenciennes classified L. stellatus in the new monospecific genus Halieutaea, although he did not name its author. The genus Halieutaea is the sister group to the other two clades, the Indo-Pacific clade and the Eastern Pacific and Western Atlantic clade, of the family Ogcocephalidae. The family Ogcocephalidae is classified in the monotypic suborder Ogcocephaloidei within the order Lophiiformes, the anglerfishes in the 5th edition of Fishes of the World.

Specimens assigned to this species collected in the Red Sea and some parts of the Indian Ocean may be a separate, undescribed species which has been given the common name of Alcock's batfish.

== Etymology ==
The starry handfish has the genus name Halieutaea which is Greek for "angler" or "fishermam", a reference to the habit of these fishes of resting on the bottom and using their lures to attract prey towards them. The specific name, stellata, means "starry", this is an allusion to the spiny tubercles on the upper body which are shape like stars.

== Description ==
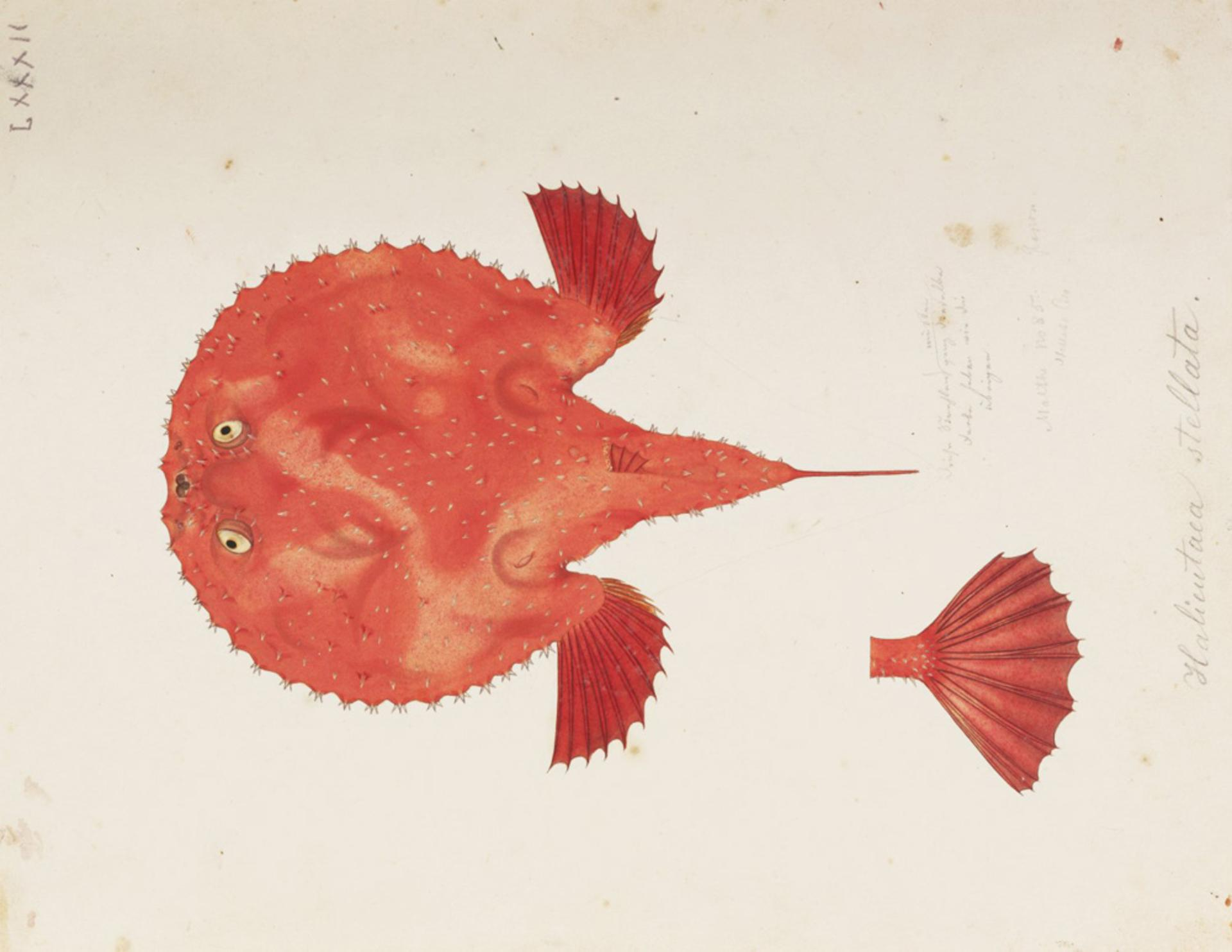
Drawing by Kawahara Keiga, 1823-1829.

The starry handfish has a body which is a wide, flattened disc. The dorsal and anal fin each have 4 soft rays. The tail is shorter than the diameter of the disc. The space between the eyes is wide than the diameter of the eyes, there is a depression on the snout where the fishing apparatus is stored, the illicial cavity. The large mouth is located on the front of the head and is not overhung by the snout. The esca is made up of 2 lobes which are not clearly separate, a dorsal flap and a slender, ventral fringe. The pectoral fins stick out from the posterior margin of the disc while the pelvic fins are under the disc. The overall colour is pinkish to red marked with numerous spots which form irregular crescents over the body. The fins are red, sometimes with black margins. The upper body is covered in robust, simple spines, the majority of these have 4 roots. The spines on the rear margin of the disc and on the tail have 4 or 5 points. The skin on the underside is covered in many spines. The starry batfish has a maximum published total length of 30 cm (12 in).

== Distribution and habitat ==
The starry handfish has a wide distribution in the eastern Indian Ocean and Western Pacific Ocean, they occur from the Sea of Japan and southern Japan in the north, south to Australia and northern New Zealand, east to New Caledonia and Vanuatu to French Polynesia. In Australia this species is found from northern Western Australia east to Queensland and south as far as Newcastle, New South Wales. Records of this species from Indonesia. the Andaman Sea and the western Indian Ocean probably refer to an, as yet, undescribed species. The starry batfish as a benthic fish which occurs at depths between 50 and 400 m (160 and 1,310 ft) on the continental shelf and margin.

== Utilisation ==
The starry handfish is used in traditional Chinese medicine,
