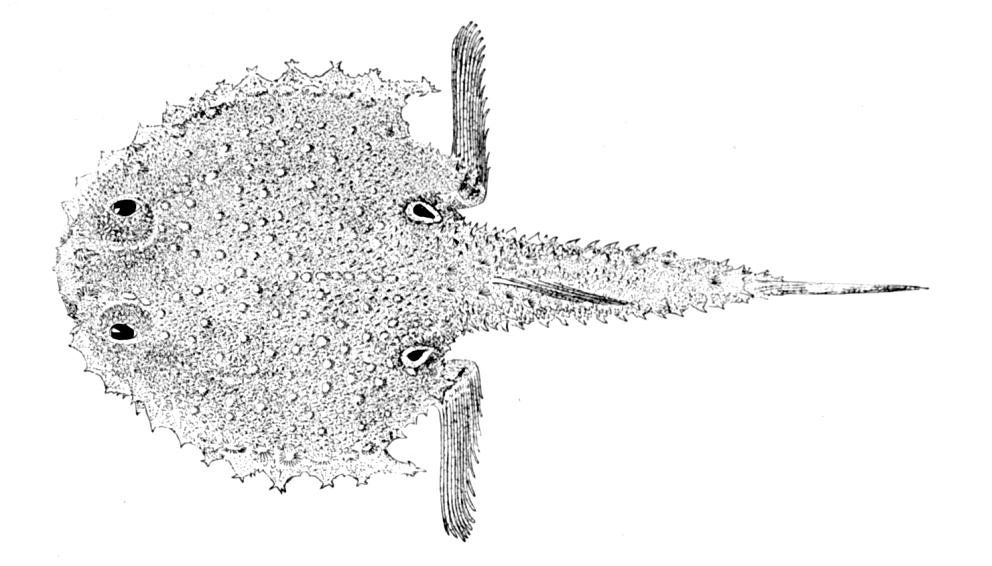

Conservation status
- Least Concern (IUCN 3.1)

Scientific classification
- Kingdom: Animalia
- Phylum: Chordata
- Class: Actinopterygii
- Order: Lophiiformes
- Family: Ogcocephalidae
- Genus: Dibranchus
- Species: D. atlanticus

Binomial name
- Dibranchus atlanticus W. K. H. Peters, 1876

Synonyms
- Halieutaea senticosa Goode, 1881

= Dibranchus atlanticus =

Species of fish

Dibranchus atlanticus, the Atlantic batfish, is a species of marine ray-finned fish belonging to the family Ogcocephalidae, the deep-sea batfishes. It is found in deep water in the Atlantic Ocean where it lives on the seabed, feeding on small invertebrates.

== Taxonomy ==
Dibranchus atlanticus was first formally described in 1872 by the German zoologist Wilhelm Peters with its type locality given as near the coast of Western Africa at a depth of 360 fathoms (2,160 ft; 660 m). When he described D. atlanticus Peters proposed the new monospecific genus Dibranchus for it, it is now the type species of Dibranchus by monotypy. The genus Dibranchus is classified within the "Indo-Pacific clade" of the family Ogcocephalidae. The family Ogcocephalidae is classified in the monotypic suborder Ogcocephaloidei within the order Lophiiformes, the anglerfishes in the 5th edition of Fishes of the World.

== Etymology ==
Dibranchus atlanticus is the type species of the genus Dibranchus, a name which prefixes di, meaning "two", on to branchus, meaning "gills", a reference to only the second and third gill arches having gills, the fourth having no gill filaments. The specific epithet atlanticus, means "of the Atlantic".

== Description ==
D. atlanticus has a disc-shaped, vertically compressed body with a flat ventral surface, and grows to a standard length of 145 mm (6 in). The dorsal fin, which is set far back near the tail, has no spines and five to seven soft rays, and the anal fin has no spines and four soft rays. The pectoral fins are robust and held at right angles to the body; they are limb-like and are used to "walk" over the seabed, and the more slender pelvic fins serve the same purpose. Under the operculum there is a sturdy multi-pointed spine. The bases of the fins, apart from the dorsal fin, are decorated with tubercles (cone-shaped scales) and the ventral surface of the disc is covered by distinct scales. The dorsal surface of the fish is usually a uniform reddish-grey, but specimens in the eastern Atlantic sometimes have reticulated markings. The ventral surface is paler.

== Distribution and habitat ==
D. atlanticus is found in both the western and eastern Atlantic Ocean. Its range extends from the coasts of Canada and the United States, southwards through the Caribbean Sea and Gulf of Mexico to South America, as far south as Rio de Janeiro. In the eastern Atlantic its range includes northwestern Ireland and extends southwards to the Gulf of Guinea and Angola. Its depth range is from 45 to 1,300 m (150 to 4,270 ft), but it is most common between 300 and 823 m (1,000 and 2,700 ft). It is a bathypelagic species found on the seabed on muddy and sandy sediments.

== Biology ==
This fish may be bioluminescent, as there has been a report that in the laboratory, its skin can emit flashes of light when stimulated with peroxidase, but this effect has not been observed in living specimens. It lures prey to the vicinity of its mouth; its diet consists of small invertebrates such as polychaete worms, amphipods, clams, starfish, brittle stars and sea spiders.

== Status ==
This deep sea fish is of no interest to commercial fisheries but it is often caught in deep water trawl surveys and appears to be common. The International Union for Conservation of Nature has listed it as being a "least-concern species".
