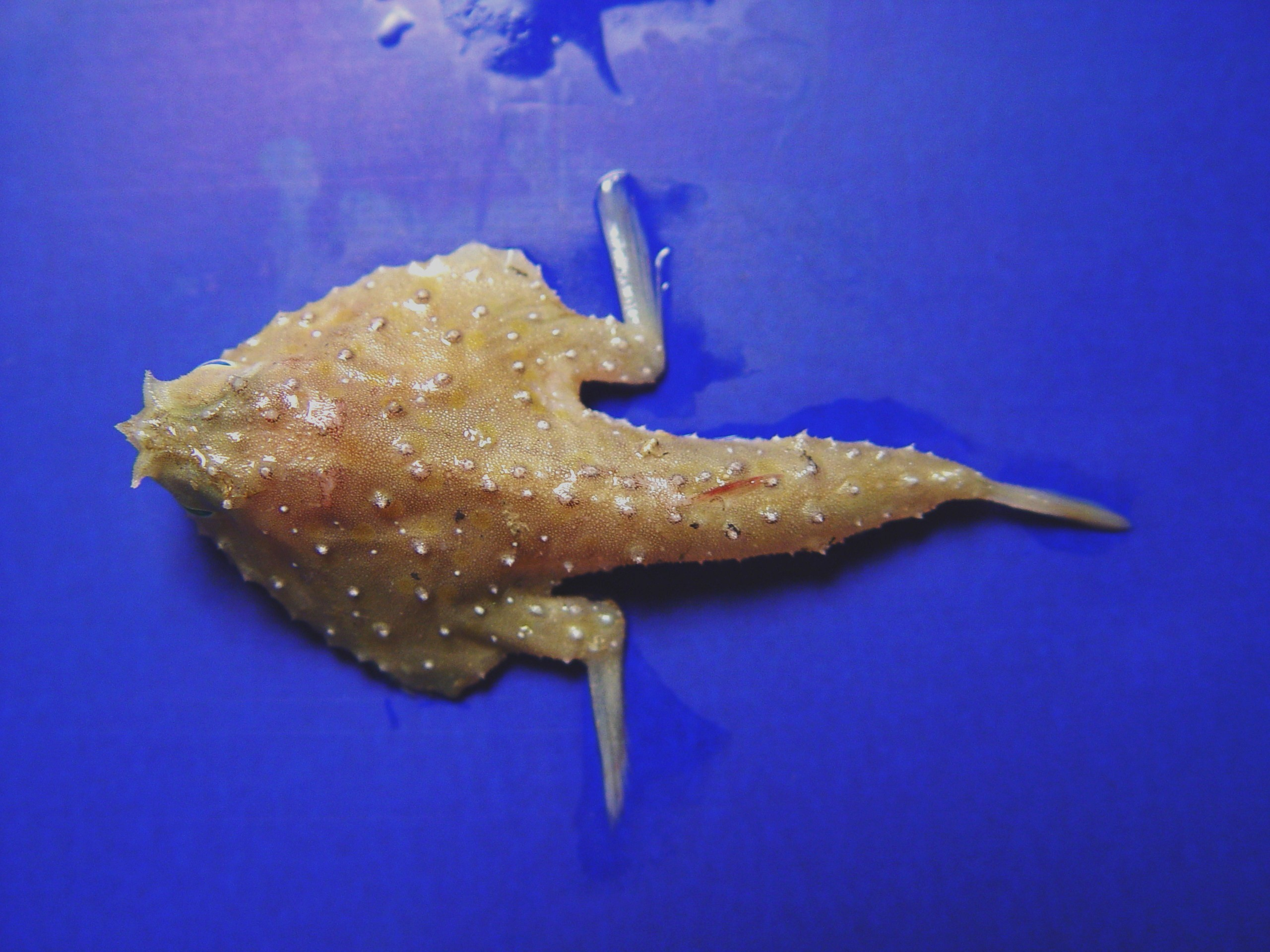
- Zalieutes mcgintyi

Scientific classification
- Kingdom: Animalia
- Phylum: Chordata
- Class: Actinopterygii
- Order: Lophiiformes
- Family: Ogcocephalidae
- Genus: Zalieutes; D. S. Jordan & Evermann, 1896

Type species
- Malthe elater D. S. Jordan & C. H. Gilbert 1882

= Zalieutes =

Genus of fishes

Zalieutes is a genus of marine ray-finned fishes belonging to the family Ogcocephalidae, the deep sea batfishes. The species in this genus are benthic fishes found in deep waters in the Western Atlantic and Eastern Pacific Oceans.

== Taxonomy ==
Zalieutes was first proposed as a monospecific genus in 1896 by David Starr Jordan and Barton Warren Evermann with Malthe elater as its type species by monotypy. M. elater was first formally described in 1882 by Jordan and Charles Henry Gilbert with its type locality given as Mazatlán Harbor in Sinaloa, western Mexico. This genus is classified within the "Eastern Pacific/Western Atlantic clade" of the family Ogcocephalidae. The family Ogcocephalidae is classified in the monotypic suborder Ogcocephaloidei within the order Lophiiformes, the anglerfishes in the 5th edition of Fishes of the World.

== Etymology ==
Zalieutes is a compound of zale, which means the "surge of the sea", Jordan and Evermann did not explain what they were alluding to here but it may refer to Z. elater being described from Mazatlán Harbor while when it is more common in moderately deep waters rather than near to the shore, it may have been driven closer to shore during a storm surge; and halieutes, the Greek for "angler" or "fisherman", a reference to the feeding method used by this fish, sitting stationary on the ocean floor and luring in small fishes and crustaceans with its esca.

== Species ==
Zalieutes has two recognised species classified within it:

- Zalieutes elater (D. S. Jordan & C. H. Gilbert, 1882) (Roundel batfish)
- Zalieutes mcgintyi (Fowler, 1952) (Tricorn batfish)

== Characteristics ==
Zalieutes batfishes have the head flattened so far that it is level with the disc, the disc can be rounded to triangular. The mouth is small, the illicium is short and rests in a small cavity which is underneath the conical Rostrum (anatomy) directed forwards with similar sized cones pointing diagonally forward on either side of it, this takes th form of a short horn in juveniles. The esca is triangular, with no lobes. The gill rakers are modified into long slender plates with a covering of teeth. They do not have a large spine at the lower rear angle of the operculum. The gill openings are small and they are located to the rear of the upper base of the pectoral fin. The dorsal and anal fins are small and located at the rear of body. The pectoral fins are limb like and they are clearly separated from the body. They have a long tail. The body is covered with small and large tubercles while the underside of tail is covered with prickles and two rows of conical scales. These fishes have maximum published total lengths of 15 cm (5.9 in) for Z. elater and 10 cm (3.9 in) for Z. mcgintyi.

== Distribution and habitat ==
Zalieutes batfishes are demersal fishes found off the coasts of the Americas. The roundel batfish (Z. elater) is found on soft substrates at depths between 20 and 115 m (66 and 377 ft) in the Eastern Pacific Ocean where it occurs from southern California and the Gulf of California south as far as northern Peru, it is also found off Cocos and Malpelo Islands. The tricorn batfish (Z. mcgintyi) is found in the Western Atlantic Ocean at depths between 90 and 660 m (300 and 2,170 ft). although it is typically found no deeper than 180 m (590 ft). Its range extends from Florida to French Guiana, it has been recorded as far north as North Carolina and it may be present in the Gulf of Mexico and the Caribbean, but its presence in these areas is uncertain.
