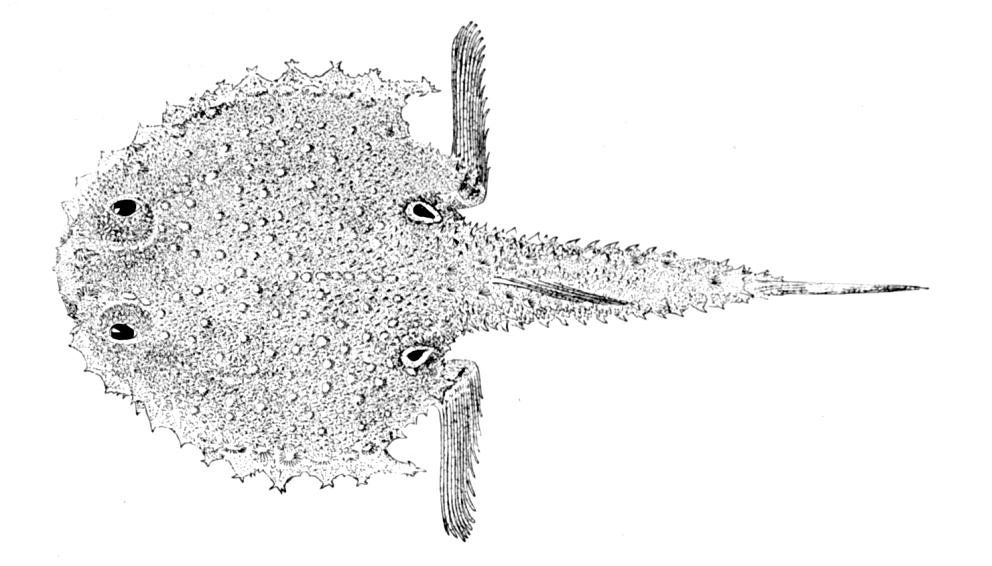
- Atlantic batfish, (D. atlanticus)

Scientific classification
- Kingdom: Animalia
- Phylum: Chordata
- Class: Actinopterygii
- Order: Lophiiformes
- Family: Ogcocephalidae
- Genus: Dibranchus; Peters, 1876

Type species
- Dibranchus atlanticus Peters, 1876

Synonyms
- Dibranchichthys Garman, 1899; Dibranchopsis Garman, 1899

= Dibranchus =

Genus of fishes

Dibranchus is a genus of marine ray-finned fishes belonging to the family Ogcocephalidae, the deep sea batfishes. The fishes in this genus are widely distributed in the Atlantic, Indian and Pacific Oceans.

== Taxonomy ==
Dibranchus was first proposed as a monospecific genus in 1902 by the German zoologist Wilhelm Peters when he described Dibranchus atlanticus. The type locality of D. atlanticus was given as near the coast of Western Africa at a depth of 360 fathoms (2,160 ft; 660 m). This genus is classified within the "Indo-Pacific clade" of the family Ogcocephalidae. The family Ogcocephalidae is classified in the monotypic suborder Ogcocephaloidei within the order Lophiiformes, the anglerfishes in the 5th edition of Fishes of the World.

== Etymology ==
Dibranchus prefixes di, meaning "two", on to branchus, meaning "gills", a reference to only the second and third gill arches having gills, the fourth having no gill filaments.

== Species ==
Dibranchus has the following species classified within it:

- Dibranchus accinctus Bradbury, 1999
- Dibranchus atlanticus Peters, 1876 (Atlantic batfish)
- Dibranchus cracens Bradbury, McCosker & Long, 1999
- Dibranchus discors Bradbury, McCosker & Long, 1999
- Dibranchus erinaceus Garman, 1899
- Dibranchus hystrix Garman, 1899
- Dibranchus japonicus Amaoka & Toyoshima, 1981 (Japanese seabat)
- Dibranchus nasutus Alcock, 1891
- Dibranchus nudivomer Garman, 1899
- Dibranchus sparsus Garman, 1899
- Dibranchus spinosus Garman, 1899
- Dibranchus spongiosa C. H. Gilbert, 1890
- Dibranchus tremendus Bradbury, 1999
- Dibranchus velutinus Bradbury, 1999

Many authorities treat D. nasutus and D. nudiventer as members of the genus Halieutopsis.

== Characteristics ==
Dibranchus batfishes have flattened heads which widen into roughly oval or triangular discs and a long caudal peduncle. The mouth varies in size from relatively small to quite large. The space on the snout for storing the illicium is small and has a bony ridge covered in sharp spines overhanging it. The esca, or lure, consists of a central bulb which has a further pair of bulges at its base, there is no separation between the three components. The eye is not covered inn skin and there is a large preopercular spine\, this has between 4 and 8 spinelets on either side of its tip. The openings to the gills are small and are located to the rear of the upper base of the pectoral fins and the gill rakers are tiny pads of teeth placed on stalks. The dorsal and anal fins are small, positioned to the rear of body. The base of the pectoral fins do not have a membrane connecting them to the body or caudal peduncle. The pelvic fins are not reduced. The lateral line is interrupted, the rear section bends downwards immediately in front of the anus. The scales have bony tubercles with many small spines. The ventral surface of the body is wholly covered in scales. The largest species in this genus is D. tremendus of the central Atlantic, which has a maximum published total length of 19.2 cm (7.6 in), while the smallest is D. sparsus of the eastern central Pacific with a maximum published standard length of 8.4 cm (3.3 in).

== Distribution and habitat ==
Dibranchus batfishes are found in tropical and warm temperate waters, with most species being found in the Indian and Pacific Oceans, especially the eastern Pacific Ocean. There are two species, D. atlanticus and D. tremendus, occurring in the Atlantic Ocean; these species are found in both the eastern and western Atlantic Ocean. These batfishes are demersal fishes found between 200 m (660 ft) down to depths in excess of 2,300 m (7,500 ft). The species in this genus all seem to have specific depth ranges; for example, the two Atlantic species are separated by depth with D. atlanticus being found above depths of 800 to 1,000 m (2,600 to 3,300 ft) and D tremendus being found deeper than that.

== See also ==
- List of prehistoric bony fish
