= Margaret G. Bradbury =

American ichthyologist

- Born: July 15, 1927; Chicago, Illinois, USA
- Died: October 19, 2010 (aged 83); Pacific Grove, California
- Education: Roosevelt University
- Scientific career
- Fields: Zoology, ichthyology
- Workplaces: Hopkins Marine Station, San Francisco State University
- Doctoral advisor: Rolf L. Bolin
- Author abbrev. (zoology): Bradbury

Margaret Gertrude Bradbury, known as "Maggie" (15 July 1927 – 19 October 2010), was an American ichthyologist, educator, and illustrator. She is best known for her work on the anglerfish family Ogcocephalidae, the deep-sea batfishes.

She was born on 15 July 1927, in Chicago; her parents were Gerald Bradbury, an architect, and Margaret Bradbury. She had a younger brother, Gerald Jr. Her father died around 1938, when she was probably 11 years old. In 1947, she joined the Chicago Natural History Museum's zoology department as a staff artist. In this role, she provided illustrations for publications by many scientists associated with the museum, including the herpetologists Robert F. Inger and Karl P. Schmidt, as well as the ichthyologists Loren P. Woods and Robert H. Kanazawa. While she was at the museum, she enrolled in Roosevelt College and graduated with a bachelor's degree in zoology in 1955. She continued to work as an illustrator and was honored in 1957 by Marion Griswold Grey in the specific epithet of the dreamer Oneirodes bradburyae for her "preparation of the figure of the type specimen".

In 1955, Bradbury went on a collecting trip to the Bahamas as part of a Philadelphia Academy of Natural Sciences expedition, and on her return to the United States, she matriculated at Stanford University as a graduate student. Here, she was initially supervised by George S. Myers, but switched to Rolf L. Bolin at the Hopkins Marine Station in Pacific Grove around 1957. She worked as a teaching assistant at Stanford's Palo Alto campus and as a part-time technical assistant at the collection of South Pacific fishes at the George Vanderbilt Foundation. After transferring to Hopkins, she worked as a technician preparing research reports for California Cooperative Oceanic Fisheries Investigations at Hopkins in 1957, as an illustrator and illustrating consultant for the U.S. Bureau of Commercial Fisheries in Washington, DC, in 1959. She worked for two years as a teaching assistant in marine biology at Hopkins and gained her Ph.D. in 1963. Her doctoral dissertation was on the systematics of the deep-sea batfish family, the Ogcocephalidae, a group she was to study for the rest of her career and beyond, until her failing eyesight stopped her work.

She was appointed as assistant professor of biology at MacMurray College in Jacksonville, Illinois, in 1962, but returned to California in 1963 as an assistant professor of biological sciences at San Francisco State College, becoming associate professor in 1967 and a full professor in 1971. She remained at San Francisco State University for 34 years until her retirement in 1994. Bradbury also taught summer courses in ichthyology at Hopkins and took part in expeditions on the schooner Te Vega. She was regarded as a leading authority on the family Ogcocephalidae and published a number of papers on this group. She was a pioneer in the use of cladistics in her work. She became a fellow and a research associate of ichthyology at the California Academy of Sciences. In her retirement, she moved to Pacific Grove, where she was active as a member of the Board of Friends of the Moss Landing Marine Laboratories, and was president of that board for a number of years. She died on 19 October 2010.

== Eponyms ==
Bradbury has been honored in the specific names of these fishes:

- Oneirodes bradburyae M. G. Grey, 1957
- Coelophrys bradburyae Endo & Shinohara, 1999
- Halieutopsis margaretae Ho & K-T Shao, 2007
- Malthopsis bradburyae Ho, 2013
