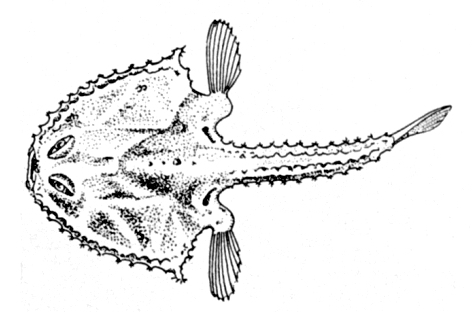
- Scarlet seabat (H. coccinea)

Scientific classification
- Kingdom: Animalia
- Phylum: Chordata
- Class: Actinopterygii
- Order: Lophiiformes
- Family: Ogcocephalidae
- Genus: Halieutaea; Valenciennes, 1837

Type species
- Halieutaea stellata Valenciennes, 1837

Synonyms
- Astrocanthus Swainson, 1839

= Halieutaea =

Genus of fishes

Halieutaea is a genus of marine ray-finned fishes belonging to the family Ogcocephalidae, the deep sea batfishes. These fishes are found in the Indian and Western Pacific Oceans.

== Taxonomy ==
Halieutaea was first proposed as a monospecific genus in 1837 by the French zoologist Achille Valenciennes with Halieutaea stellata as its only species. H. stellata had been described in 1797 as Lophius stellatus by the Norwegian biologist Martin Vahl with its type locality given as China. This genus is the sister group to the other two clades in the Family Ogcocephalidae. The family Ogcocephalidae is classified in the monotypic suborder Ogcocephaloidei within the order Lophiiformes, the anglerfishes in the 5th edition of Fishes of the World.

== Etymology ==
Halieutaea is Greek for "angler" or "fishermam", a reference to the habit of these fishes of resting on the bottom and using their lures to attract prey towards them.

== Species ==
Halieutaea contains the following valid species:

- Halieutaea brevicauda Ogilby, 1910 (Spiny seabat)
- Halieutaea coccinea Alcock, 1889 (Scarlet seabat)
- Halieutaea dromedaria Prokofiev, 2019
- Halieutaea fitzsimonsi (Gilchrist & W. W. Thompson, 1916) (Circular seabat)
- Halieutaea fumosa Alcock, 1894 (Smoky seabat)
- Halieutaea hancocki Regan, 1908 (Hairy seabat)
- Halieutaea indica Annandale & J. T. Jenkins, 1910 (Indian handfish)
- Halieutaea liogaster Regan, 1921 (African circular seabat)
- Halieutaea nigra Alcock, 1891 (Black seabat)
- Halieutaea retifera Gilbert, 1905 (Reticulate batfish)
- Halieutaea stellata (Vahl, 1797) (Starry seabat)
- Halieutaea xenoderma Prokofiev, 2020

The genus is in need of a taxonomic review as there are believed to be some undescribed species and some of the currently recognised species may be synonyms.

== Characteristics ==
Halieutaea seabats have a flattened disc like head which has a clearly rounded outline. The esca has a tongue-shaped upper lobe and two nearly joined lower lobes with cirri on the lower edge. There is a black tongue-like appendage at the base of the illicium. The snout does not overhang the mouth by too much. The teeth in the tongue are either arranged in paddle shaped patches which are set apart from each other or in a single oval patch. There are no teeth on the roof of the mouth. The scales are tubercles and of various sizes, the spaces between the scales are naked or covered in spinules. These fishes vary in size between a maximum published total length of 10.2 cm (4.0 in) for H. retifera to 30 cm (12 in) for H. fitzsimonsi and H. stellata.

== Distribution and habitat ==
Halieutaea seabats are found in the Indian and Western Pacific Oceans from the eastern coast of Africa east to French Polynesia, north to Japan and south to Australia and northern New Zealand. These bathydemersal fishes are found at depths between 20 and 494 m (66 and 1,621 ft).
