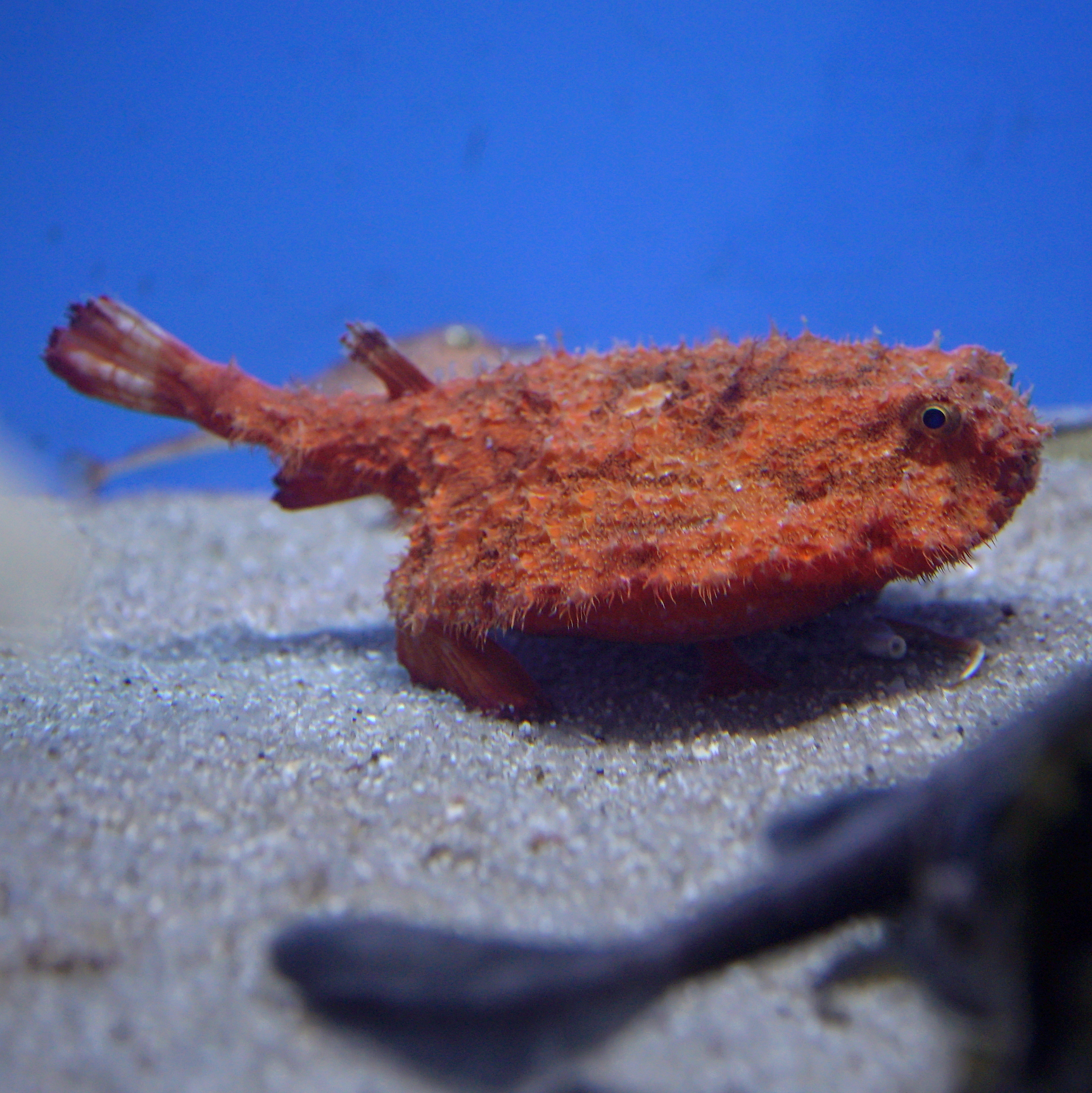
- Halieutaea stellata in Takeshima Aquarium, Japan

Scientific classification
- Kingdom: Animalia
- Phylum: Chordata
- Class: Actinopterygii
- Order: Lophiiformes
- Suborder: Ogcocephaloidei; Pietsch, 1984
- Family: Ogcocephalidae; D. S. Jordan, 1895

Genera
- see text

= Ogcocephalidae =

Ogcocephalidae Temporal range: Early Eocene to present

Family of fishes (anglerfish)

Ogcocephalidae is a family of anglerfish specifically adapted for a benthic lifestyle of crawling about on the seafloor. Ogcocephalid anglerfish are sometimes referred to as batfishes, deep-sea batfishes, handfishes, and seabats. They are found in tropical and subtropical oceans worldwide. They are mostly found at depths between 200 and 3,000 m (660 and 9,840 ft), but have been recorded as deep as 4,000 m (13,000 ft). A few species live in much shallower coastal waters and, exceptionally, may enter river estuaries.

== Taxonomy ==
Ogcocephalidae was first proposed as a separate family, the Chaunacidae, by the American biologist David Starr Jordan in 1895. Charles Tate Regan placed this family within the division Antennariformes within his suborder Lophiodea when he classified the order Pediculati, his grouping of the toadfishes and anglerfishes. In 1981 Theodore Wells Pietsch III realized that the monophyly of Regan's 1912 groupings within his Lophoidea had not been confirmed. Pietsch proposed a sister relationship between the sea toads and the Ogcocephalidae, however, was unable to identify any grouping that was a sister group to both the Chaunacidae and Ogcocephalidae nor did he find any osteological characters to support or otherwise their classification within the Antennariiformes. He, tentatively, retained both groups within the Antennarioidei even although he was unable to establish the monophyly of the four families Regan classified in the Antennariiformes in 1912. In 1984 Pietsch classified the Ogcocephalidae in the monotypic suborder Ogcocephaloidei within the Lophiiformes. This is the classification followed by the 5th edition of Fishes of the World.

The most basal genus in the Ogcocephalidae is Halieutaea and this is the sister group to the rest of the family. The remaining genera divide into two clades, an eastern Pacific/western Atlantic clade; including Ogcocephalus, Zalieutes and Halieutichthys and a Indo-Pacific clade, containing the remaining genera.

== Genera ==
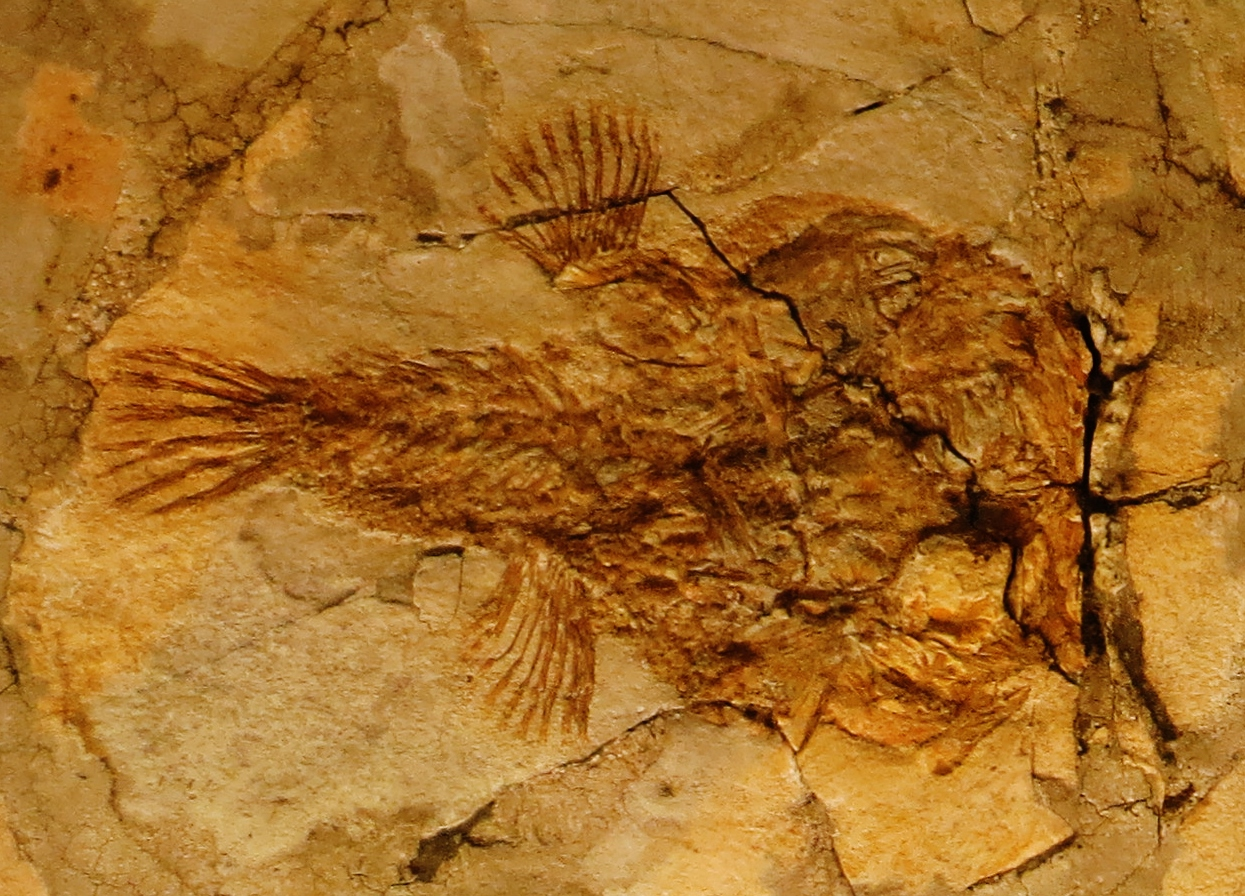
Fossil specimen of Tarkus squirei

Ogcocephalidae contains the following genera:

- Coelophrys Brauer, 1902
- Dibranchus Peters 1876
- Halicmetus Alcock, 1891
- Halieutaea Valenciennes, 1837
- Halieutichthys Poey, 1863
- Halieutopsis Garman, 1899
- Malthopsis Alcock, 1891
- Ogcocephalus Fischer, 1813
- Solocisquama Bradbury, 1999
- Zalieutes D. S. Jordan & Evermann, 1896

A single fossil genus, †Tarkus Carnevale & Pietsch, 2010 (named after the album Tarkus) is known from the Early Eocene-aged Monte Bolca fossil site of Italy.

== Characteristics ==
Ogcocephaloidei batfishes are dorsoventrally compressed fishes similar in appearance to rays, with a large circular or triangular head (box-shaped in Coelophrys), and a small tail. The flattened head and body of these fishes is often referred to as the "disc" and is made up of the head and the body as far as the axilla of the pelvic fins, the forward edge of the disc is made up of the extended bones of the operculum sweeping backwards from the cranium and surrounding the trunk on either side. The largest members of the family are approximately 50 cm (20 in) in standard length. The illicium (a modified dorsal fin ray on the front of the head supporting the esca, a bulbous lure) may be retracted into an illicial cavity above the mouth. The pelvic and anal fins of many species are stout and thick-skinned, so as to support the body off the substrate. These fins also enable batfishes to walk on the seafloor, though the irregular shape of the fins causes most batfishes to swim awkwardly. Many species have large scales forming tubercules or bucklers which form an armour for the fish. These tubercles can be tiny and have long terminal spines, these create the impression that these fishes have a covering of coarse hair. They may also be large and highly calcified, and set closely together to create the appearance of a carapace. They are elaborately shaped, some have bosses, others crests and others have a simple pyramidal shape with no strong relief but these are highly enlarged and have robust terminal spines. The scales along the lateral line are typical scales, sometimes boat shaped, with perforations for the emergent neuromasts.

== Distribution and habitat ==
Ogcocephaloidei batfishes are found in the Indian, Pacific and Western Atlantic Oceans, with 1 species present in the eastern Atlantic and Mediterranean Sea. These benthic fishes are found in tropical to subtropical waters. They are fishes of the outer continental shelf and the continental slope, typically found at depths between 1,500 and 3,000 m (4,900 and 9,800 ft), although one species has been found at 4,000 m (13,000 ft) and others have been found inshore and even within the upstream reaches of rivers. The species in the eastern Pacific/western Atlantic clades have the widest depth ranges with the "Old World" species being restricted to deeper waters.

== Biology ==
Ogcocephalidae fishes do have a luminous esca, as in some other groups of anglerfishes, but secretes a fluid, lasting approximately two minutes, thought to act as a chemical lure which attracts prey such as crabs, snails, shrimp, and small fish. Analysis of their stomach contents indicates that batfishes feed on fish, crustaceans, and polychaete worms. These fishes are assumed not to guard their eggs and, to date, all known larvae and post larvae are pelagic. Batfishes are known to use a unique mode of locomotion where they use their pelvic and fins to walk along the seafloor instead of swim.

== Utilisation ==
Ogcocephalidae fishes are too small to be of interest to fisheries but some species have been kept in aquariums.

== Gallery ==
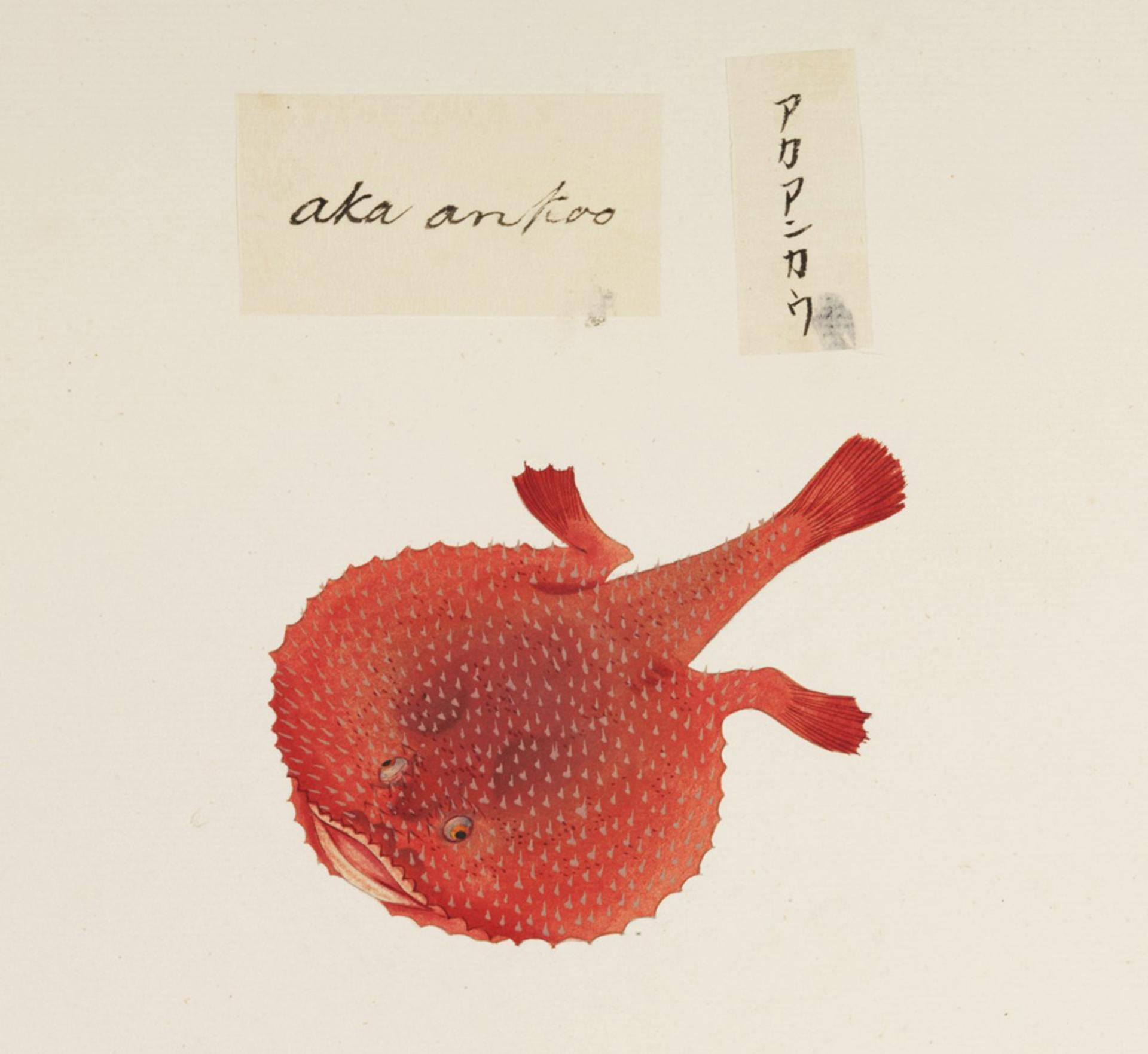
Painting of Halieutaea stellata by Ishizaki Yūshi, 1825

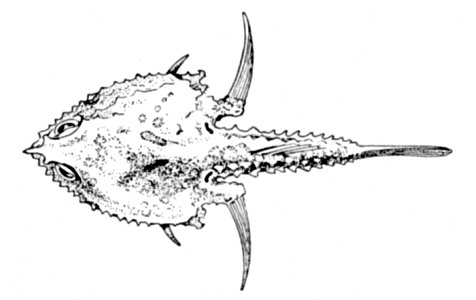
The longnose seabat (Malthopsis lutea)
