= Hungarian shield =

Defensive armour

A Hungarian (or Hungarian-style) shield was a specific form of strapped shield. It was rectangular at the bottom, but the upper edge swept upward forming a curve. The elongated upper edge was designed to protect the head and neck against sabre cuts. They were characteristic for the Hungarian light cavalry. During the 16th century, the design became popular across much of eastern Europe, among both Christian and Muslim horsemen.

In contrast, the 15th-century German Gladiatoria fechtbuch depicts what it calls ungrischer schilt used by two fencers on foot. The upward sweeping edge is less pronounced to the point of symmetry. A point is attached to the lower (hand-side) edge, apparently for offensive use, similar to a katar.

== Gallery ==
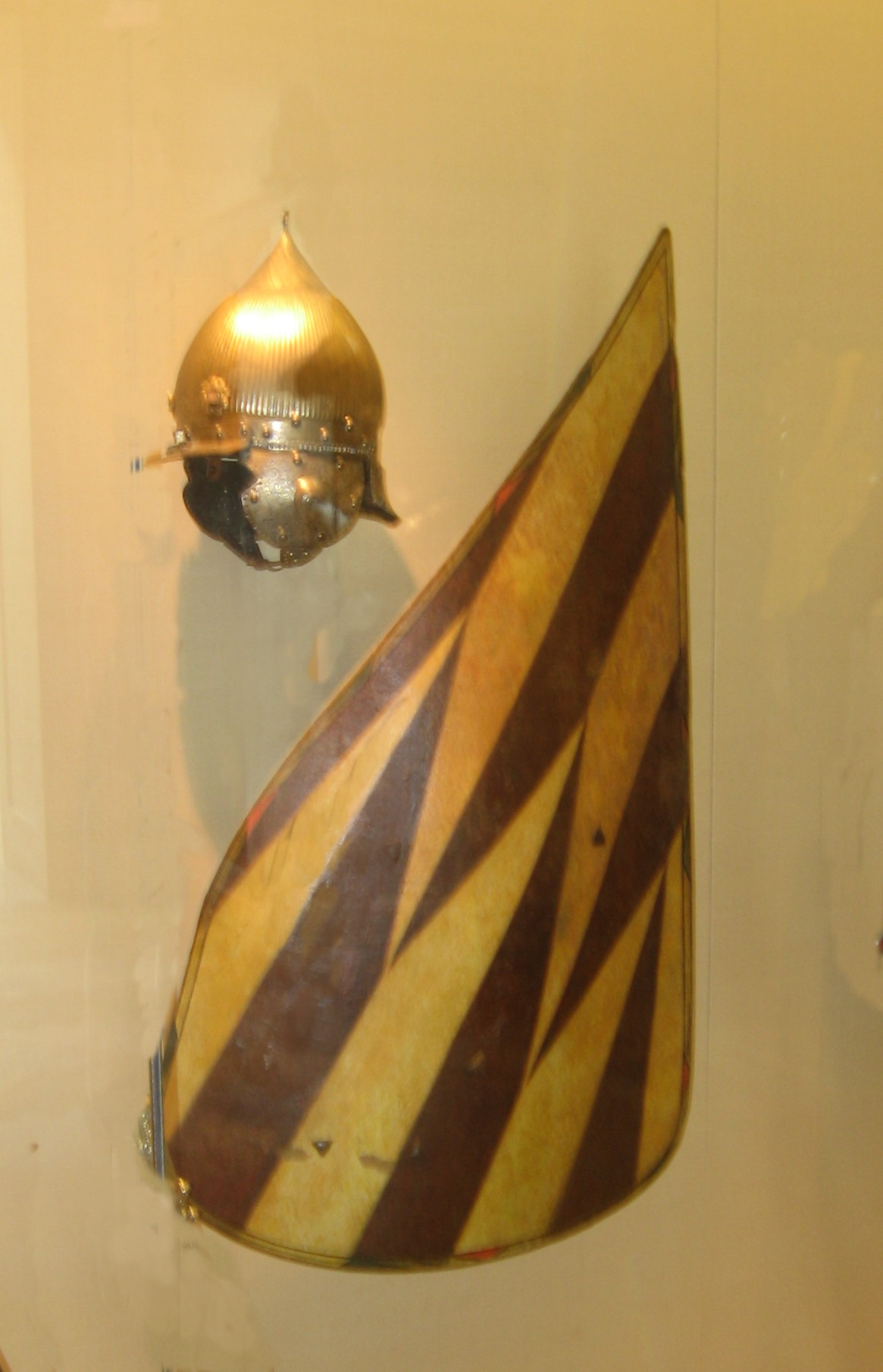
A Hungarian-style shield, with helmet, from the collection of the Metropolitan Museum of Art, New York.

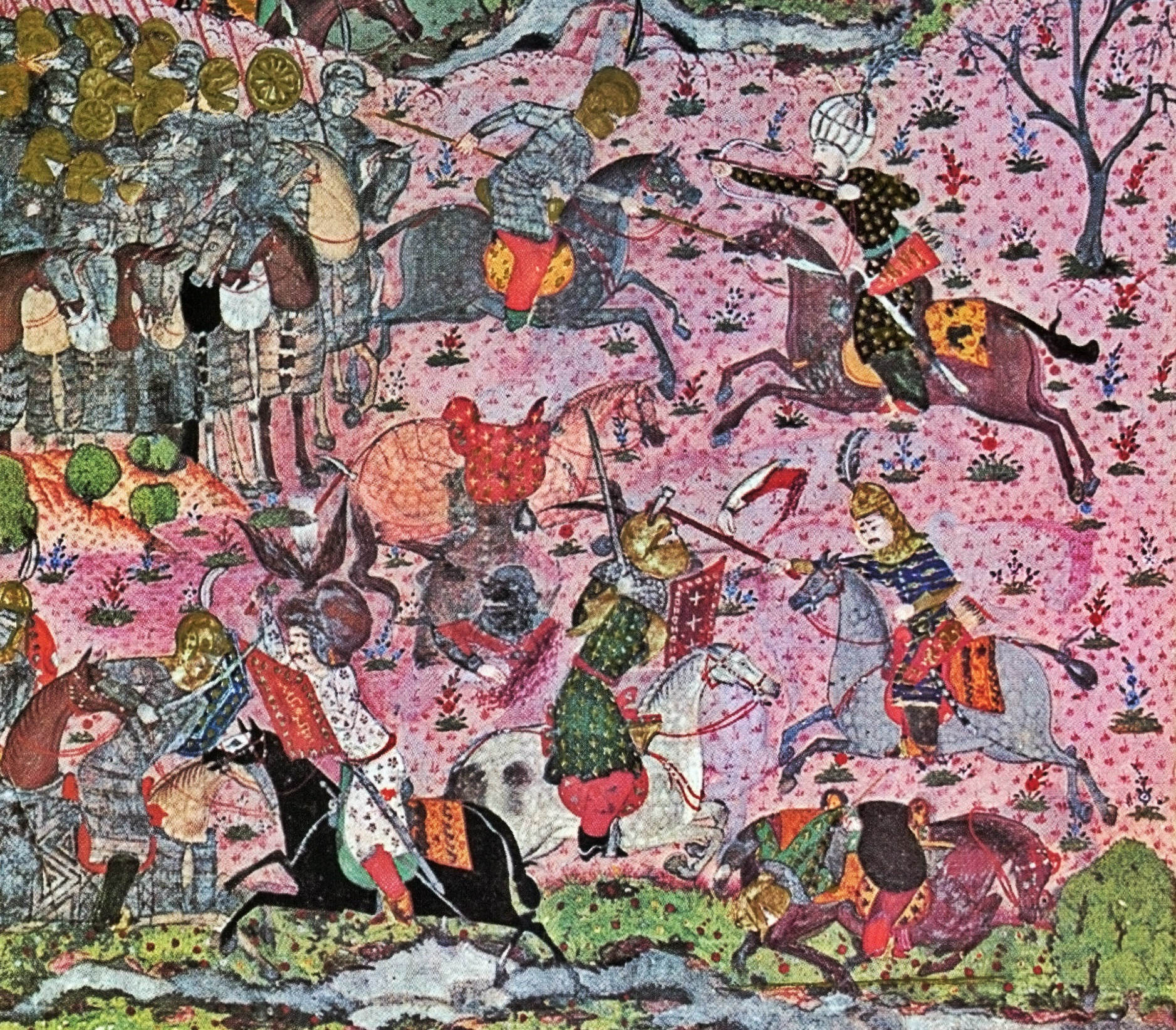
Hungarian shields in use by an Ottoman deli and Hungarian knights during the Battle of Mohacs.

A Turkish deli carrying a Hungarian shield and spear, defeats a Christian knight during the Siege of Temesvár, Futuhat-ı Cemile.

Turkish cavalry chasing after Christian gendarmes in the early 16th century, the Akinji on the bottom-right is armed with a Hungarian shield.

Mehmed the Conqueror slaying a Christian knight, who is armed with a Hungarian shield, during the failed Siege of Belgrade.

Ottoman deli, with a Hungarian shield strapped on his back, rides alongside a captured Qizilbash warrior in Nakhchivan, 1554.

Tatar and Polish light cavalry, armed with round willow shields and Hungarian shields, crashing into the Russians during the Battle of Orsha.

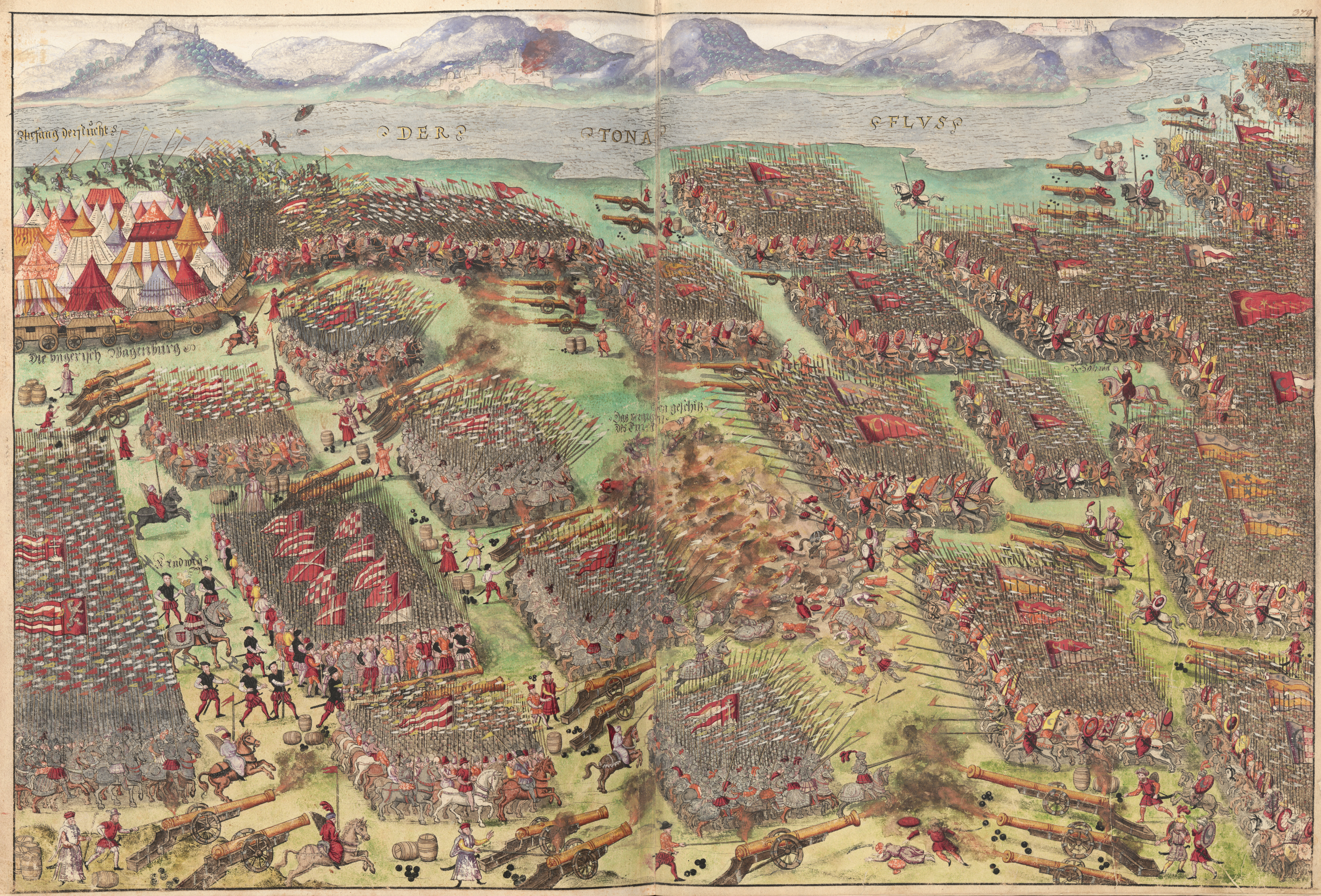
Hungarian shields, depicted alongside round willow shields, in use by Turkish cavalry at Mohacs on the right-hand side of the painting by Johann Schreier.

A Turkish akinji defeating a Christian knight, after hitting him in the gap of his plate armor with the parthian shot, during the Siege of Lippa in 1551. The knight at the bottom is armed with a Hungarian shield.

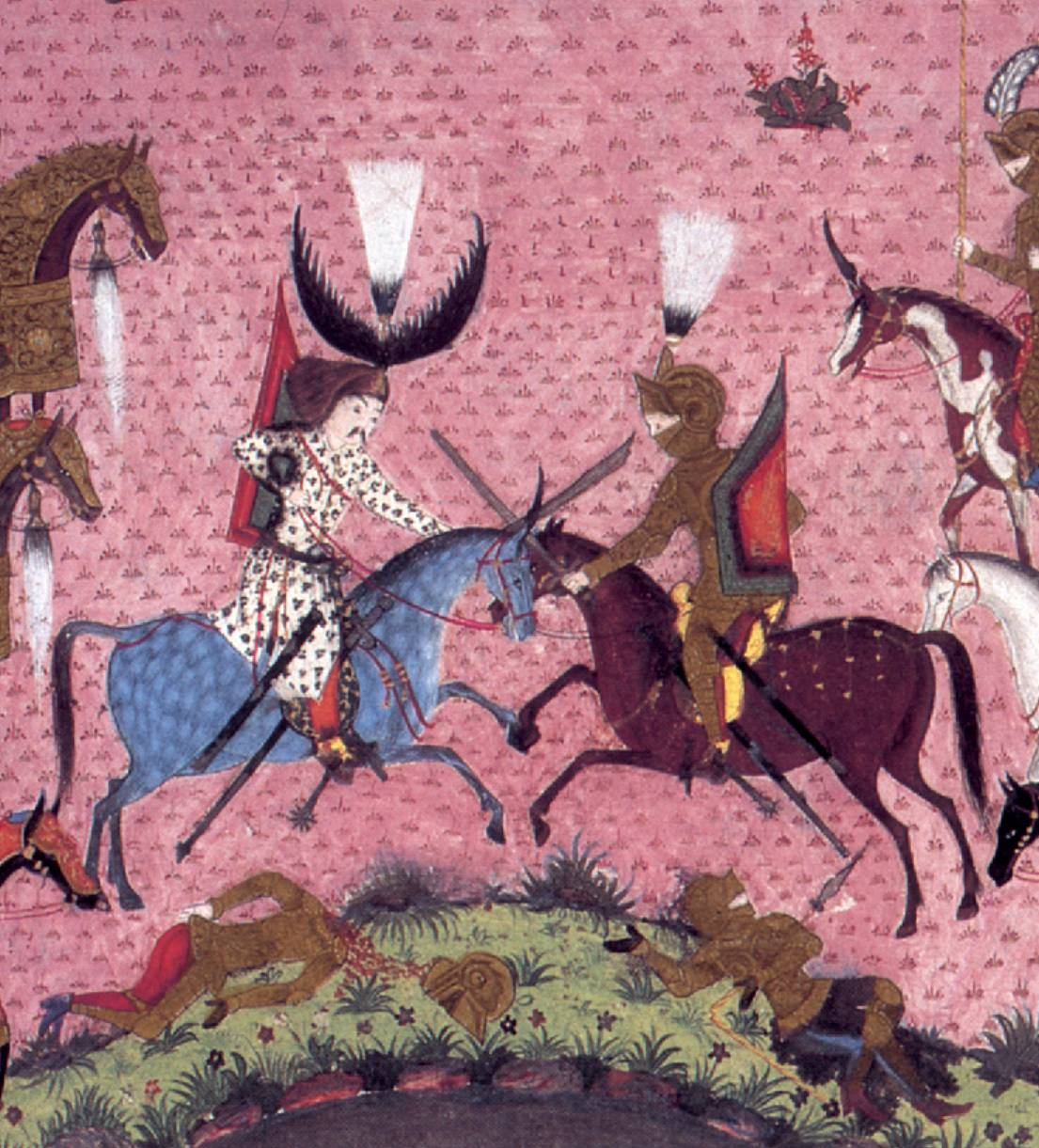
Depiction of a duel between a Turkish deli and a Hungarian knight in early 16th century, both armed with Hungarian shields.

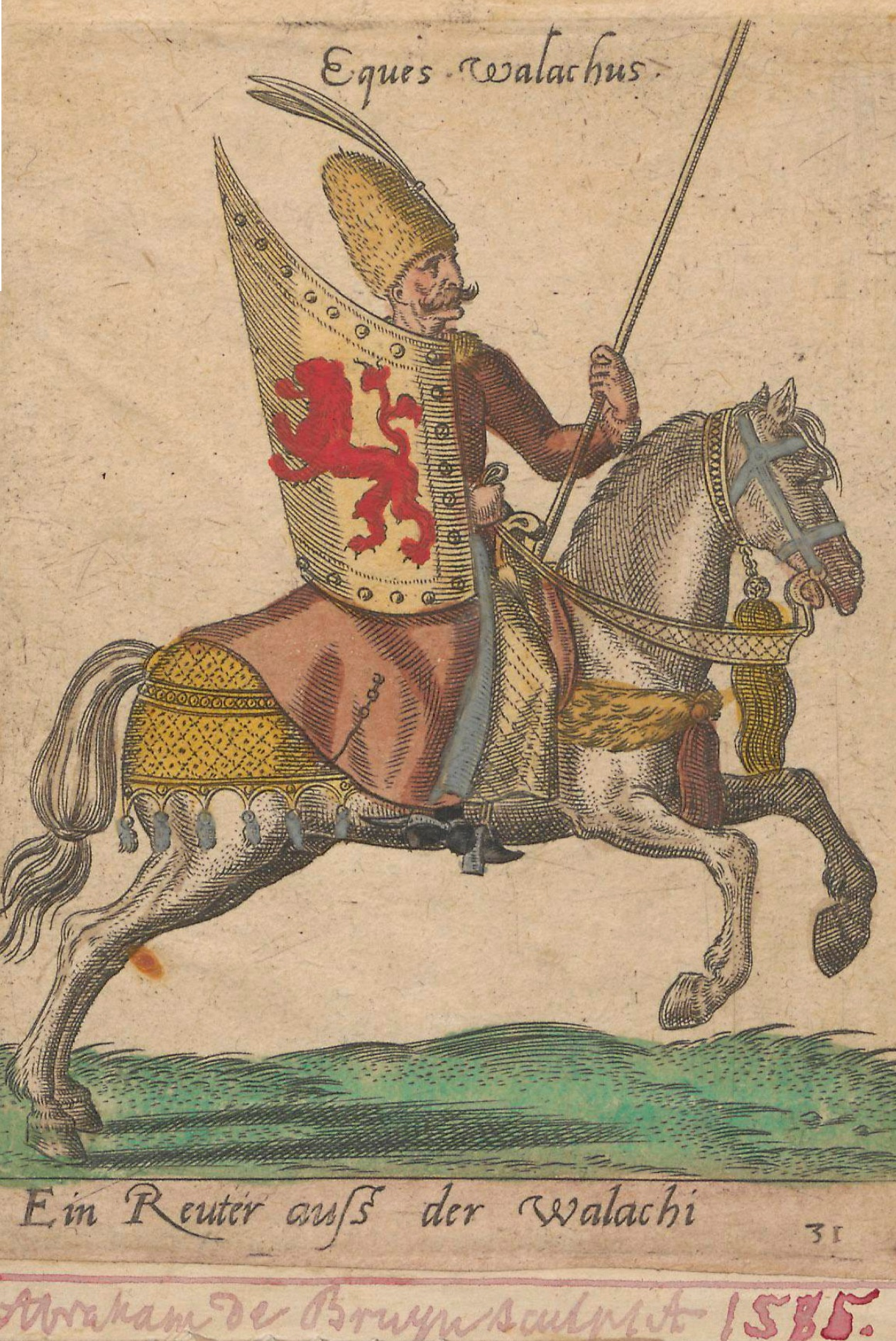
Hungarian shield in use by a Wallachian rider in the late 16th century.

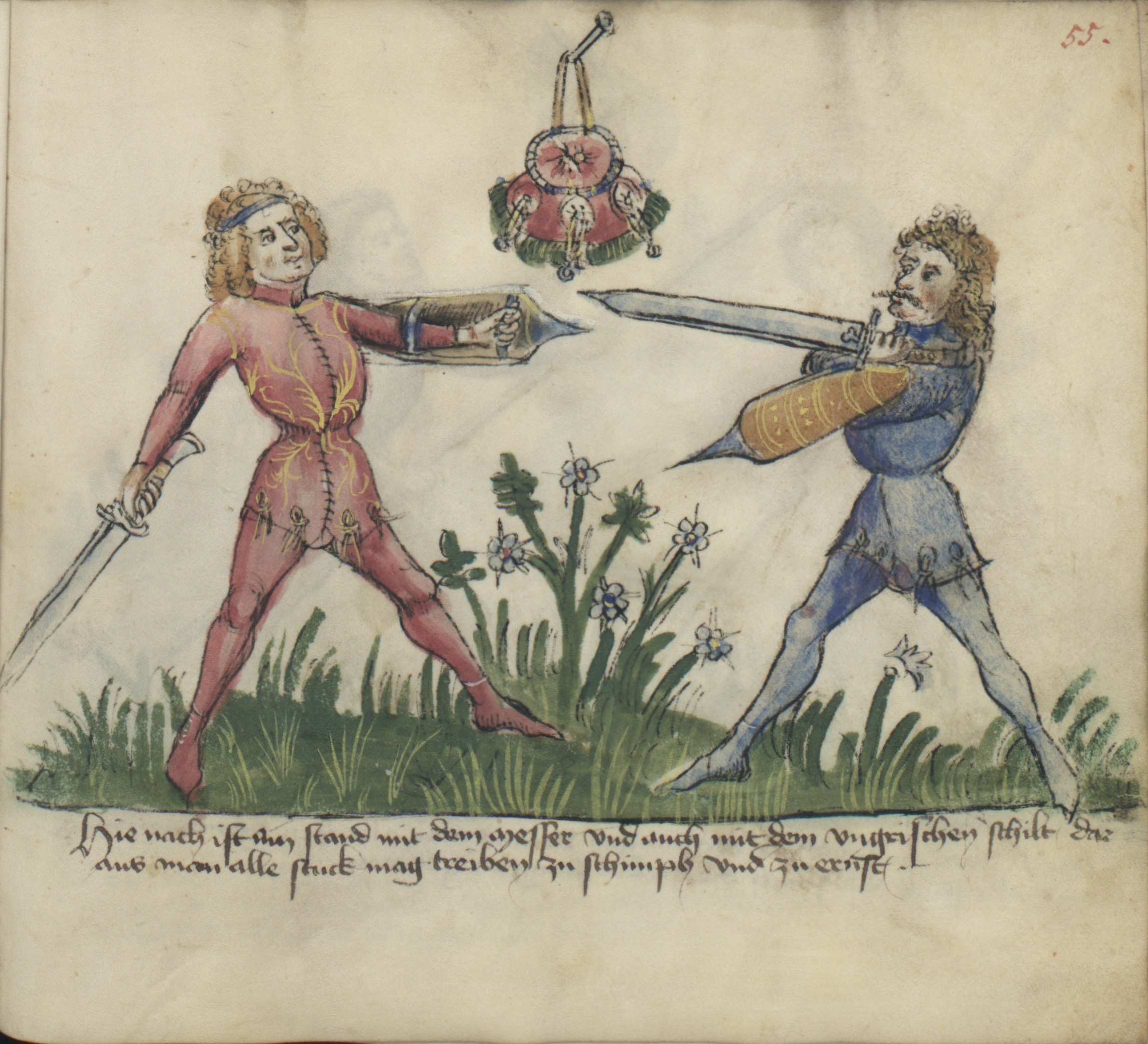
Fighting with a Messer and what is described as a "Hungarian shield" in the mid-15th-century German commentary (Gladiatoria fechtbuch fol. 55r).

== See also ==
- Lantern shield
- Buckler
