= Siege of Pécs (1551) =

1551 siege

- Part of the Habsburg–Ottoman war of 1551–1562
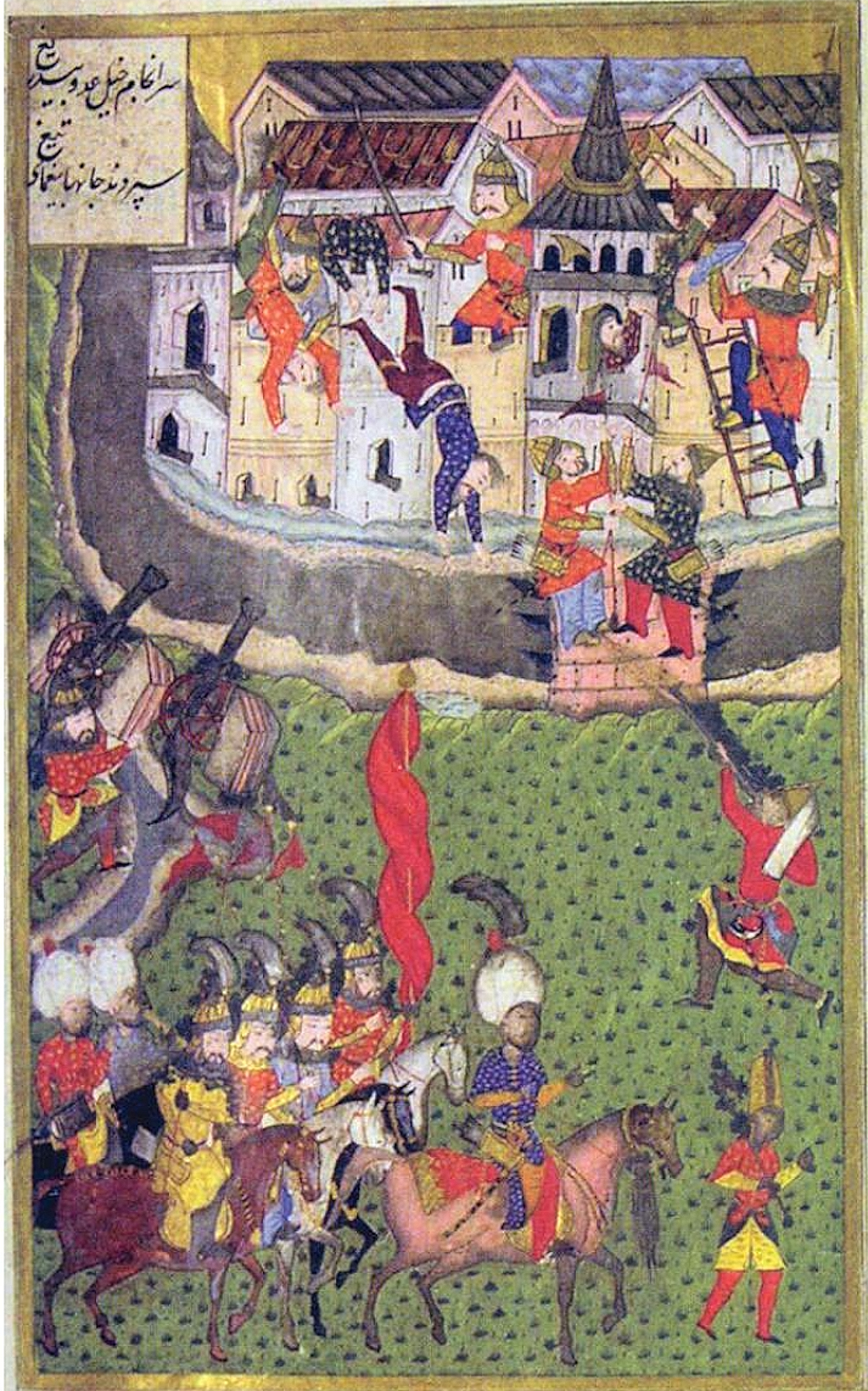
- Siege of Pecs Castle with Sokollu Mehmed Pasha (bottom) leading his troops. Futūhāt-i jamīla. Istanbul, Topkapi Palace Museum, H. 1592.
Date	November 1551
Location	Pécs in southwestern Hungary 46.0727°N 18.2323°E
Result	Ottoman victory

Belligerents
Ottoman Empire	Hungarian, Czech, German and Spanish

Commanders and leaders
Sokollu Mehmed Pasha; Kara Ahmed Pasha; Malkoč Bey	Unknown
- Location within Europe Siege of Pécs (1551) (Hungary)

The Siege of Pécs, also Siege of Becskerek, was a military conflict between the Habsburg monarchy and the Ottoman Empire in 1551, in the city of Pécs in southwestern Hungary. The siege resulted with a decisive Ottoman victory. It was part of the Habsburg–Ottoman war of 1551–1562.

== Background ==
After the Battle of Mohács in 1526, the Hungarian Kingdom split into two parts. The western part of the country came under the control of Ferdinand I from the House of Habsburg, the eastern side came under the control of John Zápolya, a Hungarian noble. Zápolya asked the help of Suleiman the Magnificent Ottoman emperor against Ferdinand. After the death of John in 1540, he was succeeded by his one-month-old son, John Sigismund Zápolya. Ferdinand in 1541 tried to capture Buda, the capital, but he was defeated by Suleiman's army. The Ottoman emperor occupied Buda after the victory and sent the young Hungarian king with his court to Lippa (today Lipova, Romania); in 1542 they moved to Gyulafehérvár (today Alba Iulia, Romania), which later became the capital of the Principality of Transylvania.

Even after this event, Ferdinand didn't give up his dream about the unification of the Hungarian Kingdom under his rule. With George Martinuzzi's help, the eastern part of the country in 1550 came under Habsburg rule, which caused the attack of the Ottoman army against Hungary.

The middle of the country came to be occupied by Suleiman the Magnificent, due to his insatisfaction with the treaty of Alba Iulia. Ottoman troops led by Sokollu Mehmed Pasha occupied central Hungary in autumn 1551.

== Siege of Pecs ==
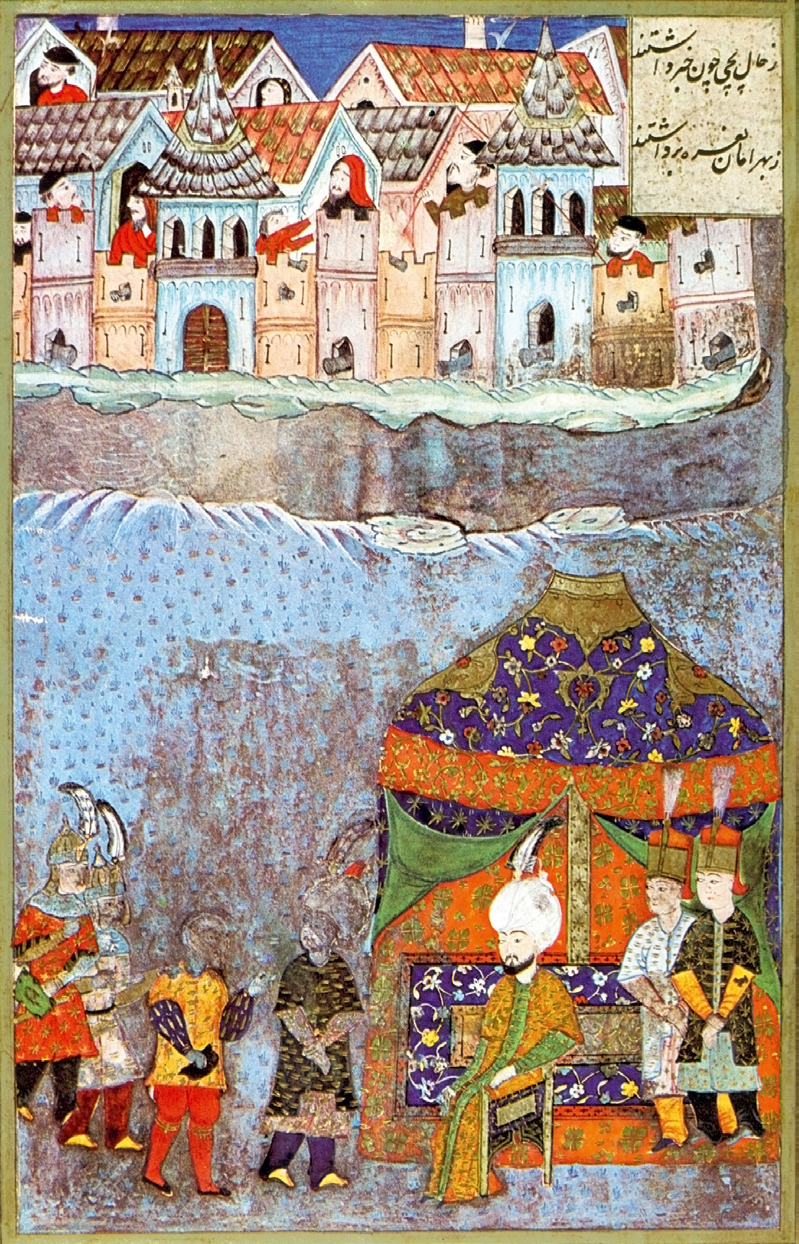
The surrender of Pecs castle, 1551. Futūhāt-i jamīla. TSMK H.1592

In the spring of 1551, the Ottomans held the Hungarian border forts of Pécs, Fehérvár, Esztergom, Vác, Nógrád, Hatvan and Szeged. During the conquest campaign in 1551, the Turks were defeated by George the Frater at Timișoara (Temesvár) and Lippa, and Suleiman was outraged. This marked the end of the peace of Drinapolis (Erdine) in 1547. György Fráter deceived the sultan - in fact, he only wanted to gain time and finally hand over Transylvania, which had been under the rule of the Kingdom of Hungary since 1003, to the Hungarian king, Ferdinand of Habsburg.

The siege of the castle of Pecs was led by Sokollu Mehmed Pasha in order to retake the city, just as the siege of Lippa after it. Miniatures from the Futūhāt-i jamila show Sokollu leading troops, while Ottoman canons shoot at the fortress.

On November 3, 1551, the two commanders George Martinuzzi and Giovanni Battista Castaldo, commander of the imperial troops in Transylvania, massed their troops in front of Lippa, which was held by the Ottomans, leading to the Siege of Lippa (1551). This started a siege of several weeks, and the Ottomans ultimately had to abandon the city.

The Ottomans Siege of Temesvár (1552) and then re-occupied Lippa in the spring of 1552.

Malkoç bey was nominated as the bey of Lippa.

== Sources ==
- Gusick, Barbara I. (July 2013). Fifteenth-Century Studies 38. Camden House. ISBN 978-1-57113-558-2.
- Faroqhi, Suraiya N.; Fleet, Kate (12 November 2012). The Cambridge History of Turkey: Volume 2, The Ottoman Empire as a World Power, 1453–1603. Cambridge University Press. ISBN 978-1-316-17554-5.
- Dávid, Géza (1 January 2000). "An Ottoman Military Career on the Hungarian Borders Kasim Voyvoda, Bey, and Pasha". Ottomans, Hungarians, and Habsburgs in Central Europe: 265–297. doi:10.1163/9789004492295_012.
