= Siege of Lippa (1551) =

1551 siege

- Part of the Habsburg–Ottoman war of 1551–1562
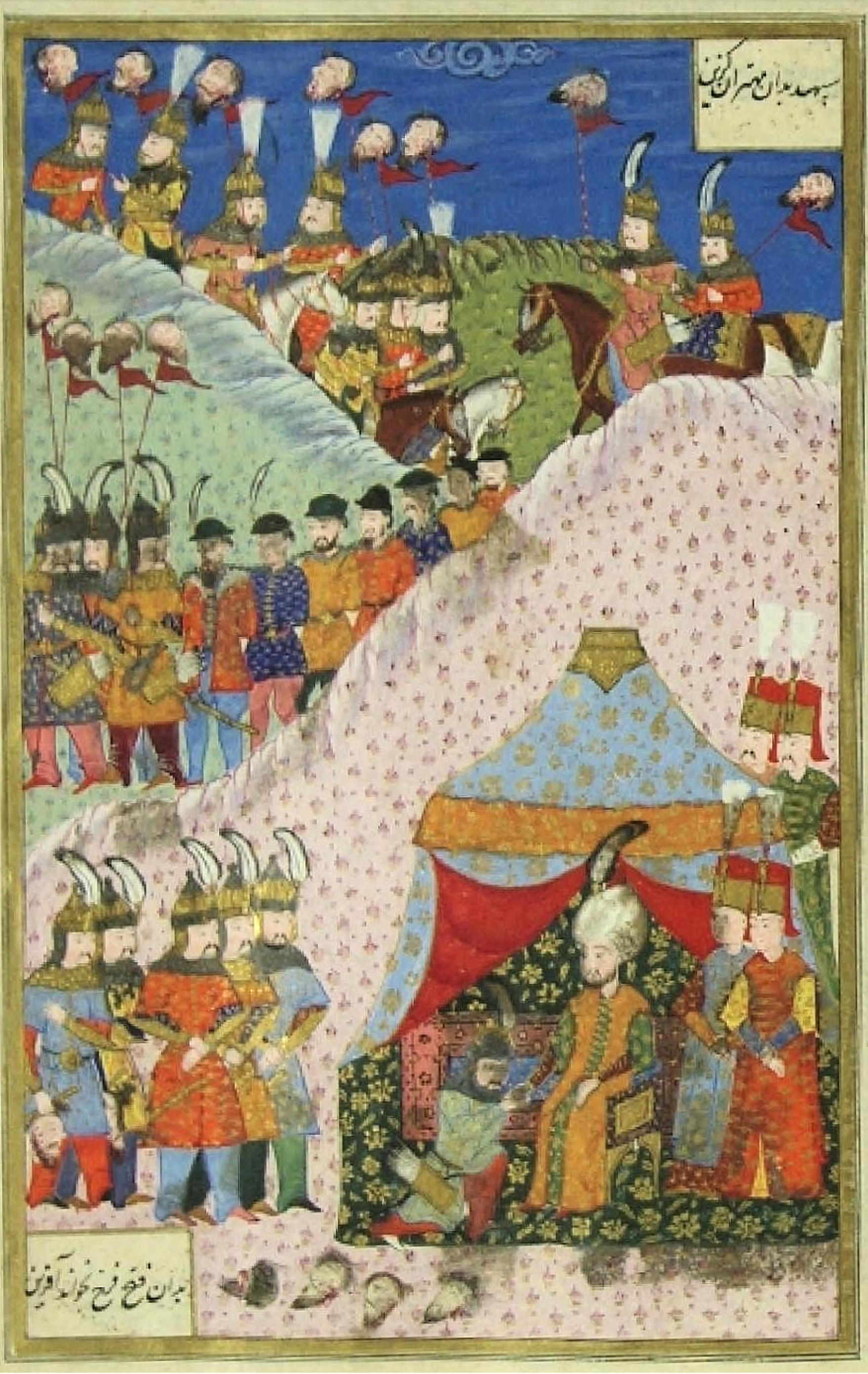
- Malkoč Bey pays his respects to Sokollu Mehmed Pasha, bringing the heads of enemies after the siege of Lippa. Futūhāt-i jamīla, 1557-58 (Topkapi Palace Museum, H.1592).
Date	November 1551
Location	Lipova, Romania 46.0906°N 21.6966°E
Result	Ottoman victory

Belligerents
Ottoman Empire	Hungarian, Czech, German and Spanish

Commanders and leaders
Sokollu Mehmed Pasha; Kara Ahmed Pasha; Malkoč Bey	Unknown
- Location within Europe Siege of Lippa (1551) (Romania)

The Siege of Lippa (1551) was a military conflict between the Habsburg monarchy and the Ottoman Empire in 1551. The siege resulted with a decisive Ottoman victory and Lippa came under Ottoman control for 164 years. It was part of the Habsburg–Ottoman war of 1551–1562.

== Background ==
After the Battle of Mohács in 1526, the Hungarian Kingdom split into two parts. The western part of the country came under the control of Ferdinand I from the House of Habsburg, the eastern side came under the control of John Zápolya, a Hungarian noble. Zápolya asked the help of Suleiman the Magnificent Ottoman emperor against Ferdinand. After the death of John in 1540, he was succeeded by his one-month-old son, John Sigismund Zápolya. Ferdinand in 1541 tried to capture Buda, the capital, but he was defeated by Suleiman's army. The Ottoman emperor occupied Buda after the victory and sent the young Hungarian king with his court to Lippa (today Lipova, Romania); in 1542 they moved to Gyulafehérvár (today Alba Iulia, Romania), which later became the capital of the Principality of Transylvania.

Even after this event, Ferdinand didn't give up his dream about the unification of the Hungarian Kingdom under his rule. With George Martinuzzi's help, the eastern part of the country in 1550 came under Habsburg rule, which caused the attack of the Ottoman army against Hungary.

== Siege of Lippa ==
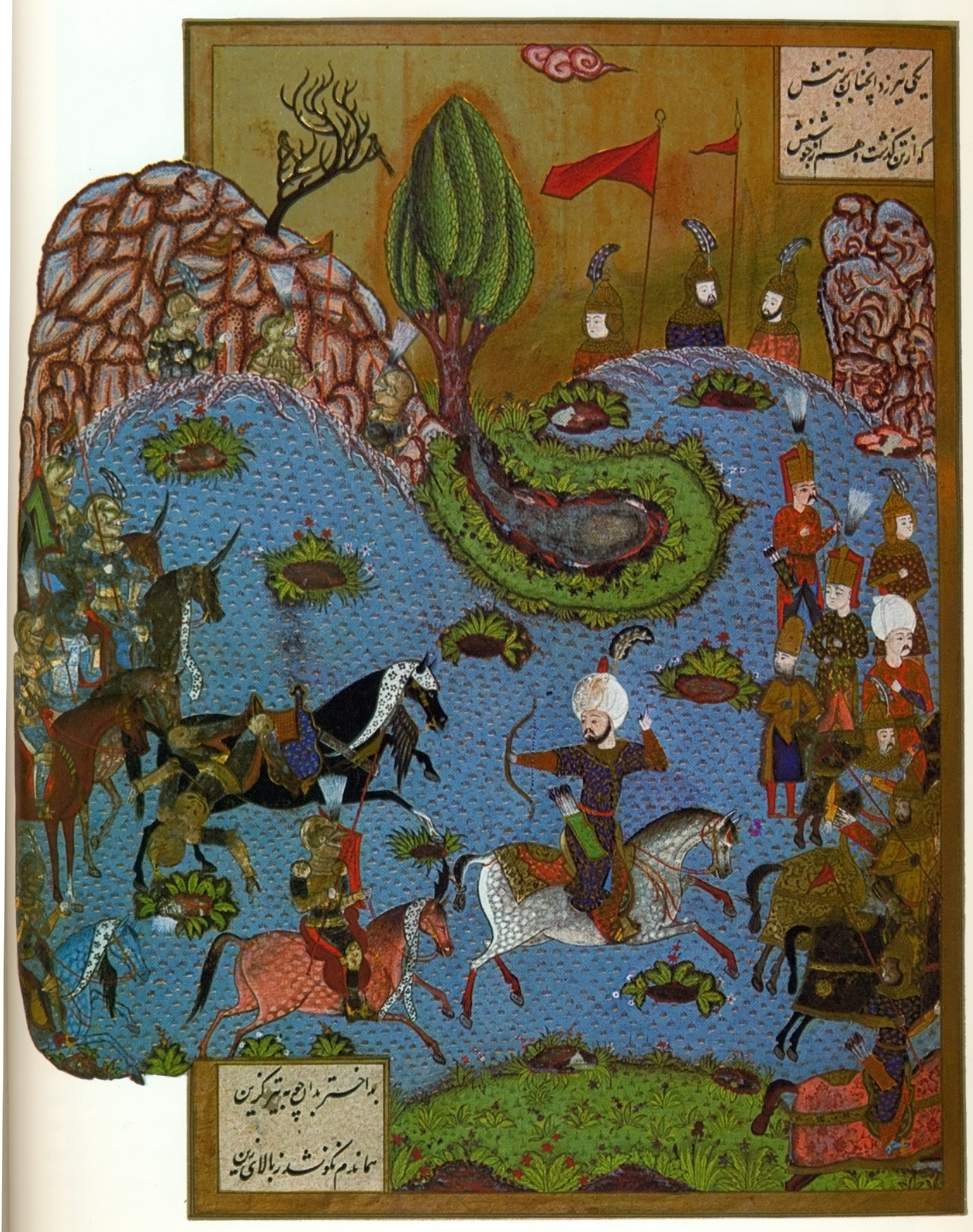
Battle at Lippa, 1551. Süleymanname, TSMK H.1517

The middle of the country came to be occupied by Suleiman the Magnificent, due to his insatisfaction with the treaty of Alba Iulia. Ottoman troops led by Sokollu Mehmed Pasha occupied central Hungary in autumn 1551, and took Lippa. They then laid siege to Temesvár in October.

On November 3, 1551, the two commanders George Martinuzzi and Giovanni Battista Castaldo, commander of the imperial troops in Transylvania, massed their troops in front of Lippa, which was held by the Ottomans. This started a siege of several weeks, and the Ottomans ultimately had to abandon the city.

The Ottomans Siege of Temesvár (1552) and then re-occupied Lippa in the spring of 1552.

Malkoç bey was nominated as the bey of Lippa.

== Sources ==
- Gusick, Barbara I. (July 2013). Fifteenth-Century Studies 38. Camden House. ISBN 978-1-57113-558-2.
- Faroqhi, Suraiya N.; Fleet, Kate (12 November 2012). The Cambridge History of Turkey: Volume 2, The Ottoman Empire as a World Power, 1453–1603. Cambridge University Press. ISBN 978-1-316-17554-5.
