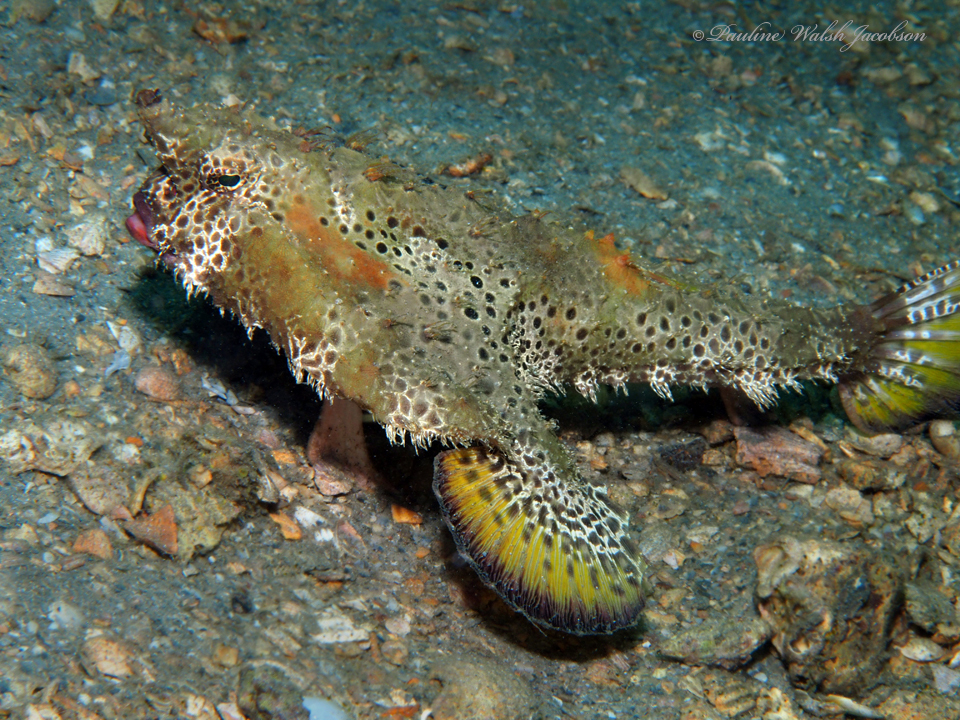

Conservation status
- Least Concern (IUCN 3.1)

Scientific classification
- Kingdom: Animalia
- Phylum: Chordata
- Class: Actinopterygii
- Order: Lophiiformes
- Family: Ogcocephalidae
- Genus: Ogcocephalus
- Species: O. cubifrons

Binomial name
- Ogcocephalus cubifrons (J. Richardson, 1836)

Synonyms
- Lophius cubifrons Richardson, 1836; Malthaea cubifrons (Richardson, 1836); Ogcocephalus radiatus Mitchill,

= Ogcocephalus cubifrons =

Species of fish

Ogcocephalus cubifrons, the spotted batfish or polka-dot batfish, is a species of ray-finned fish belonging to the family Ogcocephalidae, the deep sea batfishes. This is an uncommon demersal fish found in the Western Atlantic Ocean and the southern Gulf of Mexico, in the United States, Mexico and the Bahamas.

== Taxonomy ==
Ogcocephalus cubifrons was first formally described as Lophius cubifrons in 1836 by the Scottish naval surgeon, naturalist and Arctic explorer John Richardson with its type locality given as the Labrador coast of Canada. The genus Ogcocephalus is classified within the "Eastern Pacific/Western Atlantic clade" of the family Ogcocephalidae. The family Ogcocephalidae is classified in the monotypic suborder Ogcocephaloidei within the order Lophiiformes, the anglerfishes in the 5th edition of Fishes of the World.

== Etymology ==
Ogcocephalus cubifrons is a member of the genus Ogcocephalus, the name of which is a combination of ogkos, which means "hook", and cephalus, meaning "head", an allusion to the pointed rostrum on the snout of the type species. The specific name cubifrons, is a combination of cubus, meaning "cube", and frons, which means "forehead", an allusion to the square-shaped head.

== Description ==
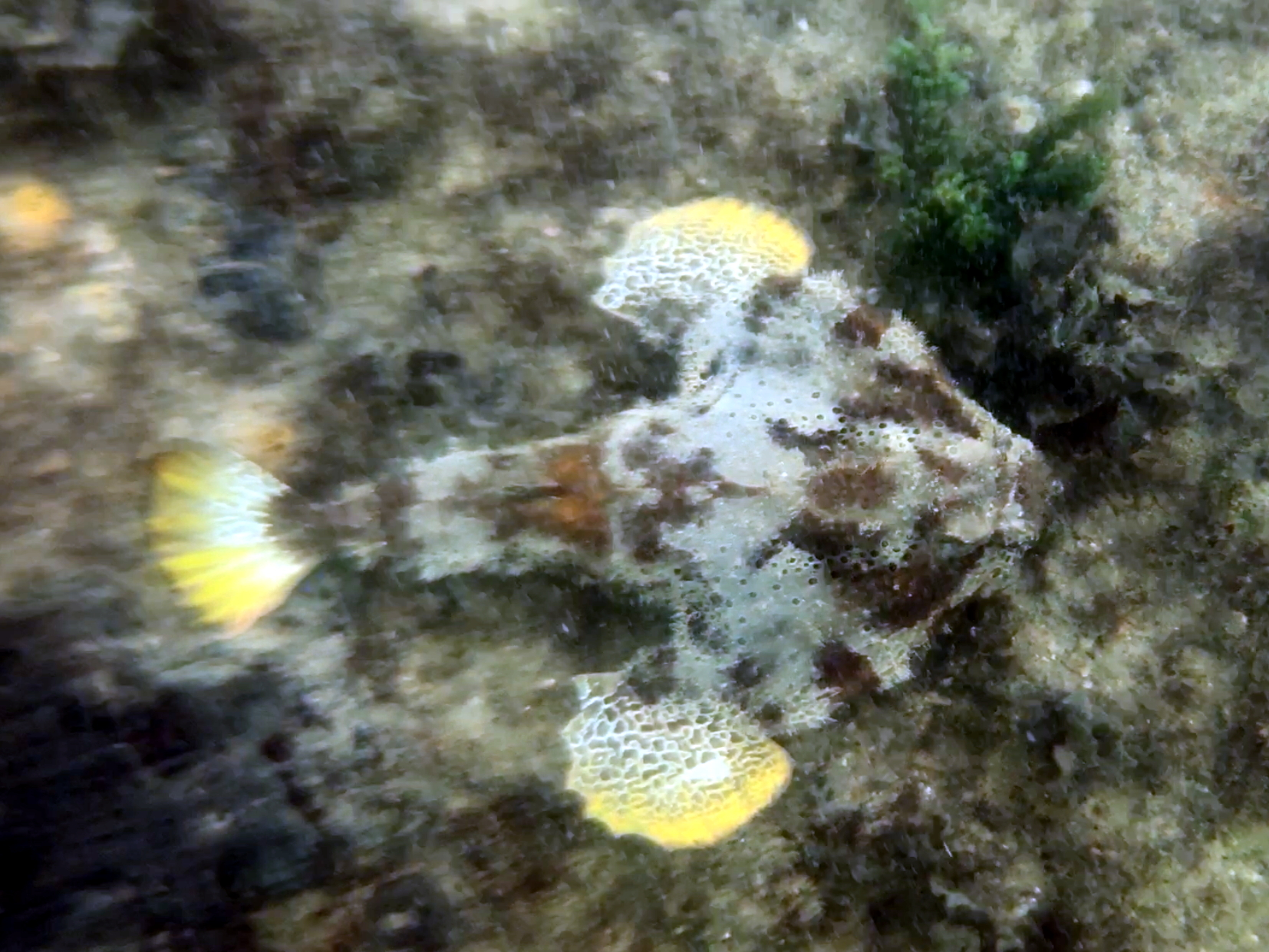
In Florida

Ogcocephalus cubifrons has a flattened head, although this is higher than the rest of the triangular disk, with a pointed snout, thinner and longer in juveniles and becoming a short and upwardly directed knob in large adults. The head of adults are very large. The eyes are laterally positioned on the head. The esca, or lure, has 3 fleshy points which is retracted into the illicial cavity under the rostrum. There is a blunt, poorly developed, simple spine on the lower, posterior angle of the operculum. The gill rakers are oval shaped plates which are covered in small teeth and the gill openings are small, opening behind the upper base of the pectoral fin, this fin and the pelvic fin's are limb-like with the pectoral fins not widely attached to the body. The skin on the underside of the fin rays thick and spongy, creating pads close to the tips of the fin rays, the fin membrane also thick and opaque. The dorsal and anal fins are small, the dorsal fin is covered in skin and is on the tail while the anal fin is fleshy and under the tail. The upper surface of the body is covered in large buckler-like scales and with conical spines, the lower surface of the body has a complete covering of pointed, bony scales and the underside of the tail has a dense covering of small spines, apart from a few conical spines on its midline. The upper surface of the body is colored pale brown to coppery red, marked with orange red and yellow-orange blotches, mostly to the rear of the eyes. There is a band of dark, pale margined spots running from the eye to the gill opening. The pectoral fins are pale, marked with a pattern of dark spots, creating a reticulated pattern on its basal two-thirds. The sides of disk are marked a lattice of pale lines on a dark background. Smaller fishes have yellow pectoral fins and a yellow caudal fin, at times with dark brown edges. The polka-dot batfish has a maximum published total length of 38 cm (15 in).

== Distribution and habitat ==
Ogcocephalus cubifrons is found in the Western Atlantic Ocean where it occurs from North Carolina southwards along the eastern coast of the United States to the Bahamas. It also occurs in the Gulf of Mexico from the Florida Keys north as far as Apalachicola, Florida and then from Mexico off Campeche and Yucatán. In the northern Gulf of Mexico this species has been claimed but these records are likely to be misidentifications of O. pantostictus. The polka-dot batfish is an uncommon demersal fish found on sand, mud and rock substrates at depths between 0 and 70 m (0 and 230 ft).

== Biology ==
Ogcocephalus cubifrons is a sluggish species, it is an ambush predator using the esca as a lure to attract prey to within striking distance of its mouth. Its diet is made up of crustaceans, mollusks, worms and small fishes. If alarmed the polka-dot batfish will flatten its wide, squat body to the substrate or it retreatsusing its paired fins like legs to find better concealment. This species has been found to be a Host (biology) for a number of parasites, especially nematodes, which can be present in very high numbers, and the polka-dot batfish may be an important part of the parasite's life cycle. The eggs and larvae are pelagic, the larvae undergo metamorphosis when they settle on the bottom.
