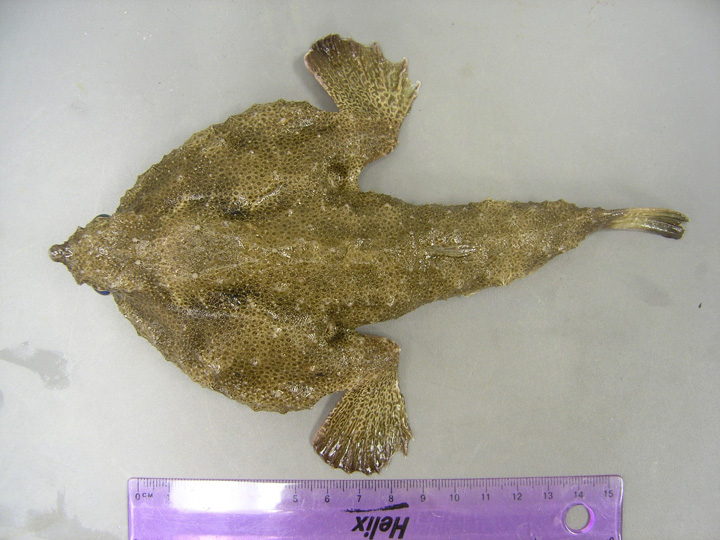

Conservation status
- Least Concern (IUCN 3.1)

Scientific classification
- Kingdom: Animalia
- Phylum: Chordata
- Class: Actinopterygii
- Order: Lophiiformes
- Family: Ogcocephalidae
- Genus: Ogcocephalus
- Species: O. pantostictus

Binomial name
- Ogcocephalus pantostictus Bradbury, 1980

= Ogcocephalus pantostictus =

Species of fish

Ogcocephalus pantostictus, the spotted batfish, is a species of ray-finned fish belonging to the family Ogcocephalidae, the deep sea batfishes. It is found in the western Atlantic Ocean, somewhat restricted to the northern and the western Gulf of Mexico.

== Taxonomy ==
Ogcocephalus pantostictus was first formally described in 1980 by the American ichthyologist Margaret G. Bradbury with its type locality given as Santa Rosa Sound, Pensacola, Florida. The genus Ogcocephalus is classified within the "Eastern Pacific/Western Atlantic clade" of the family Ogcocephalidae. The family Ogcocephalidae is classified in the monotypic suborder Ogcocephaloidei within the order Lophiiformes, the anglerfishes in the 5th edition of Fishes of the World.

== Etymology ==
Ogcocephalus pantostictus is a member of the genus Ogcocephalus, the name of which is a combination of ogkos, which means "hook", and cephalus, meaning "head", an allusion to the pointed rostrum on the snout of the type species. The specific name pantostictus, combines pantos, meaning "all", with stictus, which means "spotted", an allusion to the spots over the body of this fish.

== Description ==
Ogcocephalus pantostictus as a flattened head, although this is higher than the rest of the triangular disk, with a pointed snout. The rostrum is shelf-like and rather blunt. The esca, or lure, has 3 fleshy points which is retracted into the small illicial cavity under the rostrum. It has a wide mouth which has a width which is more than half the width of the head. There is a blunt, poorly developed, simple spine on the lower, posterior angle of the operculum. The gill rakers are oval shaped plates which are covered in small teeth and the gill openings are small, opening behind the upper base of the pectoral fin, this fin and the pelvic fin's are limb-like with the pectoral fins not widely attached to the body. The dorsal and anal fins are small, the dorsal fin is covered in skin and is on the tail while the anal fin is fleshy and under the tail. he upper surface of the body is covered in large buckler-like scales and with conical spines, the lower surface of the body has a complete covering of pointed, bony scales and the underside of the tail has a dense covering of small spines, apart from a few conical spines on its midline. The whole of the upper surd=face of this fish is covered a polka dot pattern of small spots. The spotted batfish has a maximum published total length of 31 cm (12 in).

== Distribution and habitat ==
Ogcocephalus pantosticus is endemic to the Gulf of Mexico from southwest Florida northwards along the Gulf coast of the United States into Mexico as far south as Veracruz. This species has been confused with the similar O. cubifrons but the two species appear to parapatric, O. cubifrons being found to the south of the range of the spotted batfish. The spotted batfish is a demersal fish is found at depths between 5 and 31 m (16 and 102 ft), on soft substrates.

== Biology ==
Ogcocephalus pantostictus preys on a benthic invertebrates, espacially gastropods, polychaetes, the xanthid crab, Callinectes similis, and the occasional small fish. This species has pelagic eggs and pelagic larvae.
