= Battle of Szeged (1552) =

- Part of Habsburg–Ottoman war of 1551–1562
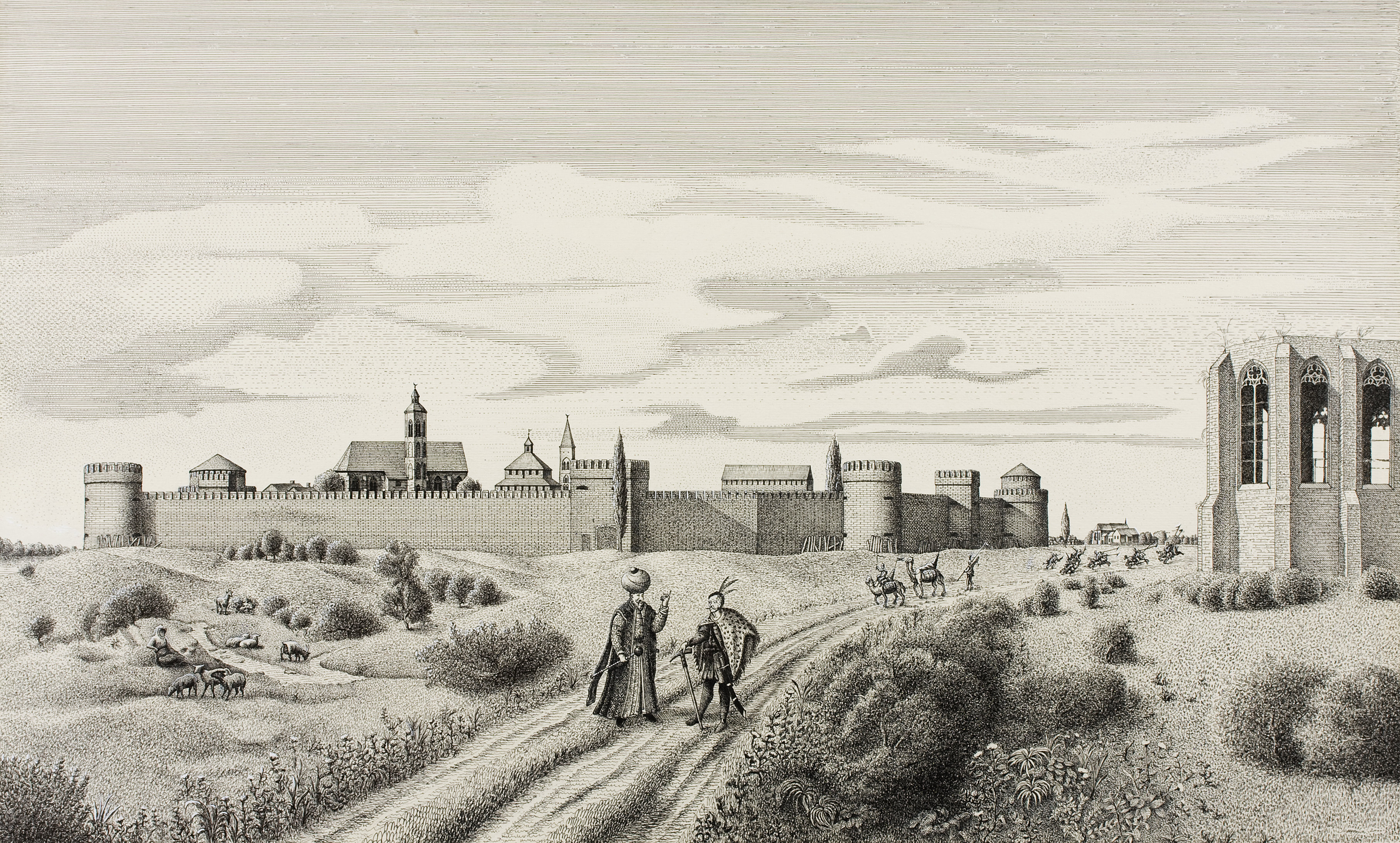
- Szeged in 17th century
Date	February 1552
Location	Szeged, Hungary
Result	Ottoman victory

Belligerents
Holy Roman Empire; Kingdom of Hungary; Habsburg Spain	Ottoman Empire

Commanders and leaders
(Holy Roman Empire) Mihály Tóth (Holy Roman Empire) Bernát Aldana (Holy Roman Empire) Péter Bakics	Mikhaloghli Khizirbeg; Ali Hadim Pasha; Rustem Bey of Szendrő

Strength
6,300 men: 5,000 Hajduk; 800 Hungarian cavalry; 300 German infantry; 200 Spanish infantry	6,500 men

Casualties and losses
5,000+ killed	Unknown

The Battle of Szeged was a military engagement between the Ottomans and the Habsburg army in Szeged. The Habsburgs besieged the city Szeged; however, an Ottoman relief army arrived and defeated the Habsburgs. The Ottoman garrison massacred the rest of the army in the city.

== History ==
The beginning of the Habsburg–Ottoman war in 1551 was opened by an Habsburg attempt to capture the city of Szeged. At the time, the Hadjuk captain and a former judge of Szeged, Mihály Tóth, undertook a raid to recapture the city with a force of 5,000 Hadjuks. Mihlay obtained support from 200 Spanish infantry led by Bernát Aldana, 300 German infantry, and a light Hungarian cavalry unit led by Péter Bakics, bringing the total force to 6,300 men.

On the night of 24 February, 1552, the Habsburgs launched the raid, and two days later he arrived there. Around 700 fishermen from the population supported the Habsburgs and allowed them to cross the Tisza River. On the night, the Habsburgs assaulted the city by capturing the Petervarad gate. The Sanjakbeg of Szeged, Mikhaloghli Khizirbeg, fled to the citadel alongside the garrison. The Habsburgs then proceeded to sack and pillage the city, killing 2,000 Turkish inhabitants.

The Habsburg soldier began resorting to drunkenness instead of besieging the citadel. Khizirbeg sent a message to the Pasha of Buda, Hadim Ali Pasha, for help. Immediately, Ali Pasha and Rustem Bey of Szendrő marched to relieve Szeged with a force of 6,500 men. As soon as he arrived, he began forming the Ottoman army into a three-battle formation, with the cavalry on the right and left and the infantry on the center. The Habsburgs quickly marched to meet the Ottomans outside. The Habsburgs first attacked but were repelled.

A second attack showed no vigor, which allowed the Ottomans to counterattack and decide the battle in their favor. The Habsburgs were scattered and routed. Mihály, Aldana, and Bakics escaped. Around 5,000 troops were killed. The Habsburgs who remained inside the city were massacred by the Ottoman garrison. The Ottomans cut off the noses of the dead soldiers and sent them to Istanbul alongside 40 flags. The Ottomans took revenge on the population for helping the Habsburgs, killing 12,000 of the population.

== Sources ==
- Jenő Horváth (1895), Hungarian War Chronicle—the military history of the thousand-year struggles of the Hungarian nation.
- Joseph von Hammer-Purgstall (1835), Histoire de l'Empire Ottoman, Vol. 6.
- József Bánlaky: Military history of the Hungarian nation (MEK-OSZK), 0014/1149. The Szeged disaster
