= Habsburg–Ottoman war of 1551–1562 =

Part of Little War in Hungary

- Part of Ottoman–Habsburg wars Little War in Hungary
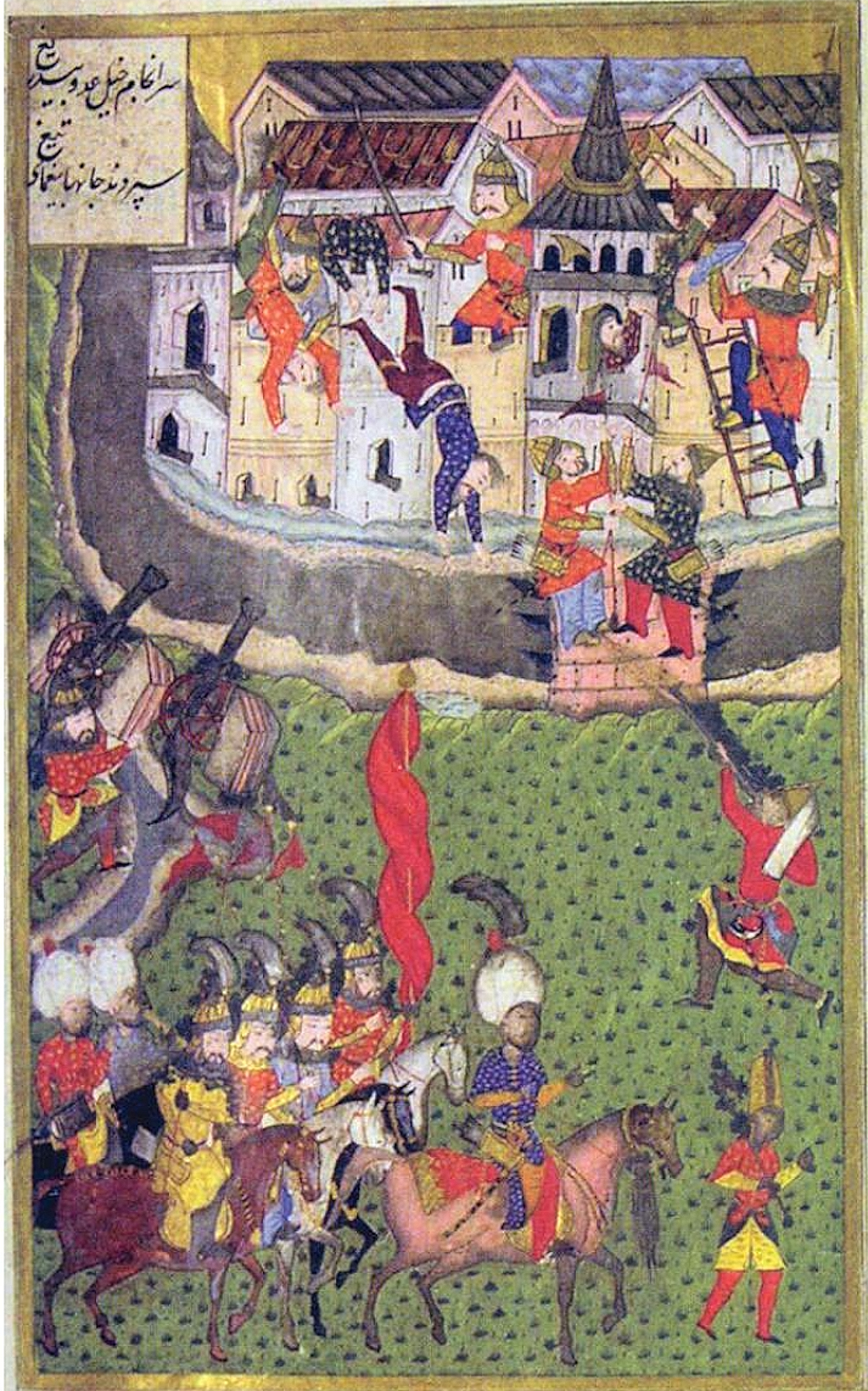
- Sokollu Mehmed Pasha (bottom) leading his troops at the Siege of Pecs Castle in 1551. Futūhāt-i jamīla of Arifi, Topkapi Palace Museum, H.1592
Date	Spring 1551–1562
Location	Balkans, Kingdom of Hungary
Result	Ottoman victory
Territorial changes	Treaty of Constantinople (1562) Ottomans conquer parts of Transylvania

Belligerents
Ottoman Empire; Kingdom of France	Habsburg Monarchy; Holy Roman Empire; Kingdom of Hungary; Kingdom of Croatia; Kingdom of Bohemia; Papal States; Spain

Commanders and leaders
Suleiman I Sokollu Mehmed Pasha; Kara Ahmed Pasha; Hadim Ali Pasha; Toygun Paşa	István Dobó; István Losonci; George Martinuzzi; Erasmus von Teufel; László Kerecsényi; Tamás Nádasdy; Nikola IV Zrinski

Strength
1552: 40,000	Unknown

Casualties and losses
Unknown	Unknown

The Habsburg–Ottoman war of 1551–1562 was a conflict between the Ottoman Empire and the Habsburg Monarchy supported by Royal Hungary. During the war, the Turks captured many castles in Hungarian and Transylvanian territory. The war ended in victory for the Ottoman Empire after the signing of the Treaty of Constantinople in 1562.

== Background ==
Ottoman Sultan Suleiman the Magnificent commenced his expansion of the empire in 1520 after the reign of Selim I. He began assaults against Hungarian- and Austrian- influenced territories, invading Hungarian soil in 1526. The Hungarian army was crushed at the Battle of Mohács and the way was paved for an attack on the Danube Basin. The battle also brought about the death of the King of Hungary and Bohemia, Louis II, leading to a disputed claim for the throne. Habsburg Emperor succeeded to the Bohemian throne but was challenged to the Hungarian throne by the pretender John Zápolya, whose claim was backed by nobles and the Sultan. The power struggle continued beyond John's death in 1540 when his son John II Sigismund Zápolya succeeded to the throne. It was not resolved until he renounced the throne in 1570, when he was succeeded by Maximilian II.

The Ottomans met resistance during the siege of Güns (Kőszeg) in 1532, where a force of 800 men under Nikola Jurišić managed to hold back the Ottoman armies. However, this only delayed their campaign by 25 days, and they continued to close in on Buda, finally occupying the capital in 1541. Buda became the seat of Ottoman rule in the area, with the Ottoman-supported John II governing the occupied territories.

== War ==
In the summer of 1552, the Ottomans, leaded by Kara Ahmed pasha, arrived at Temesvár, which was the most important city in the Banat region. The Ottoman army numbered about 30,000 men, Temesvár was defended only by captain Losonci István's 1,900 men, 700 of whom were merchants.

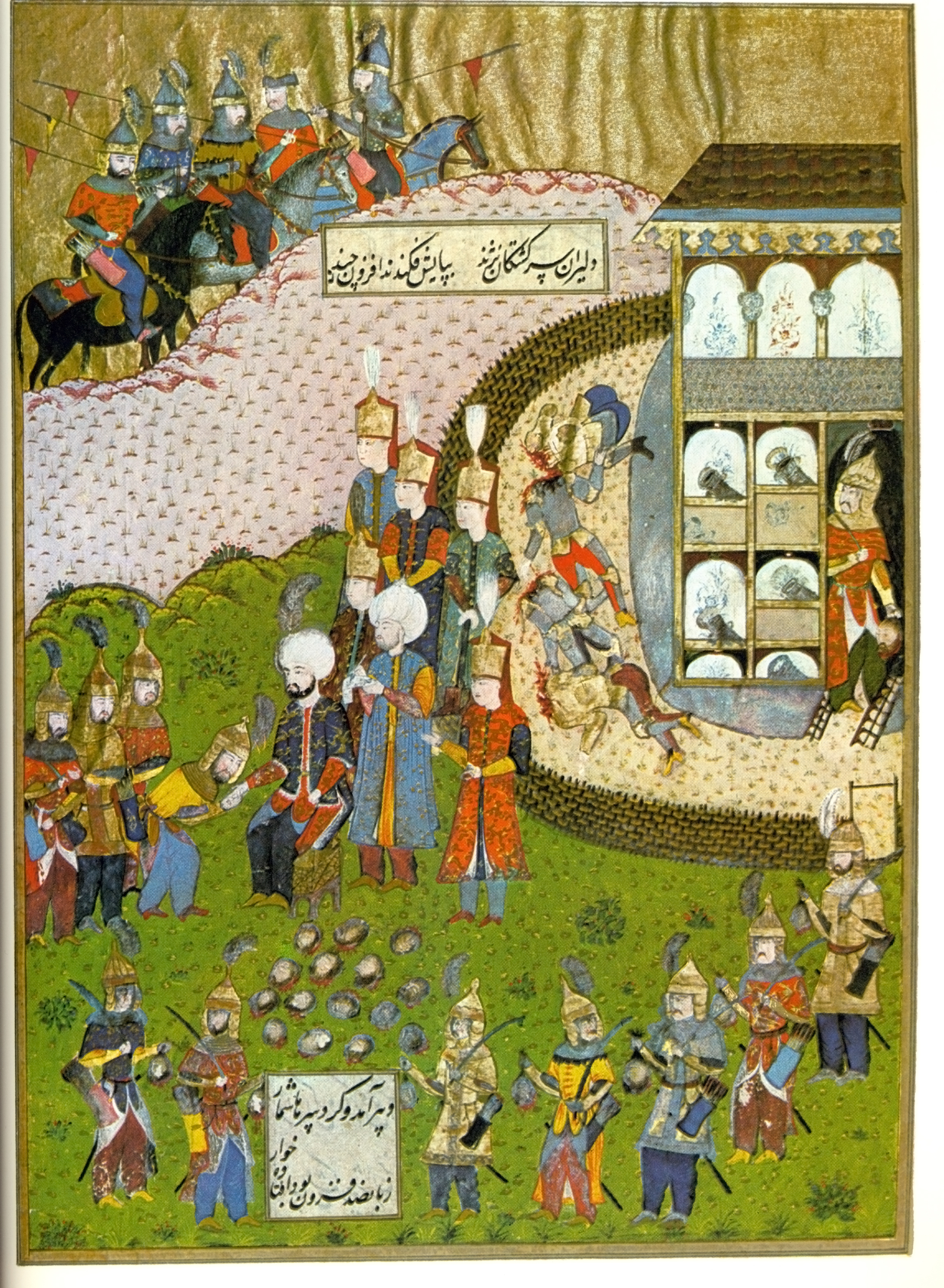
Ottomans after the capture of Temesvar in 1552. Futūhāt-i jamīla, Topkapi Palace Museum, H.1592

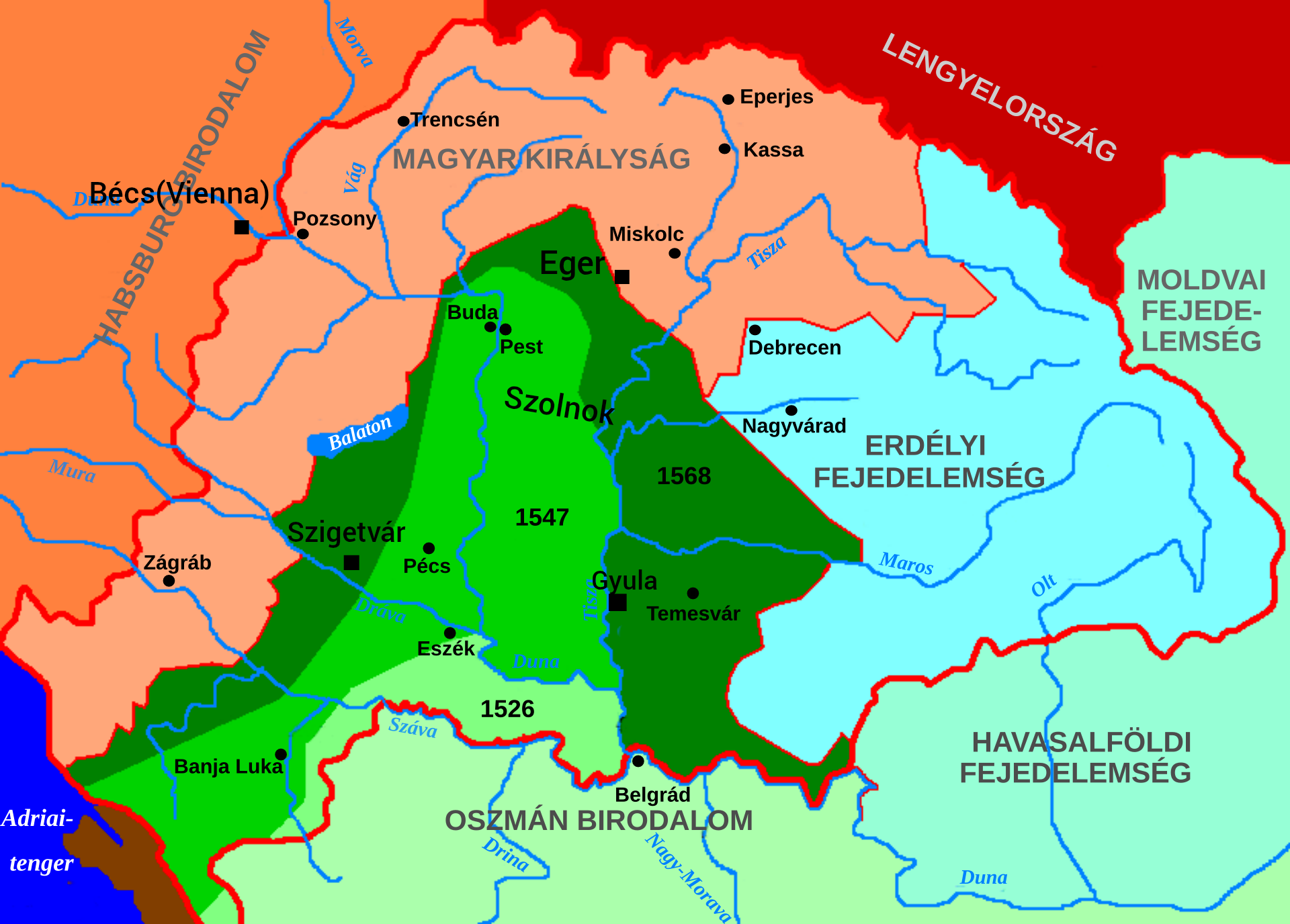
Ottoman conquests in Hungary 1541-1568

=== Siege of Temesvár ===
The Ottoman artillery started destroying the wall on 27 June, then the Ottoman infantry assaulted the wall on 3 July and 6 July, without any success. At the time of the battle, a Hungarian army led by Mihály Tóth tried to liberate the city under the siege, but his army was defeated in the battle of Szentandrás (today Sânandrei, Romania). The city fell soon after. After the capture of Temesvár, the sultan established the Temeşvar Eyalet which was composed of four sanjaks.

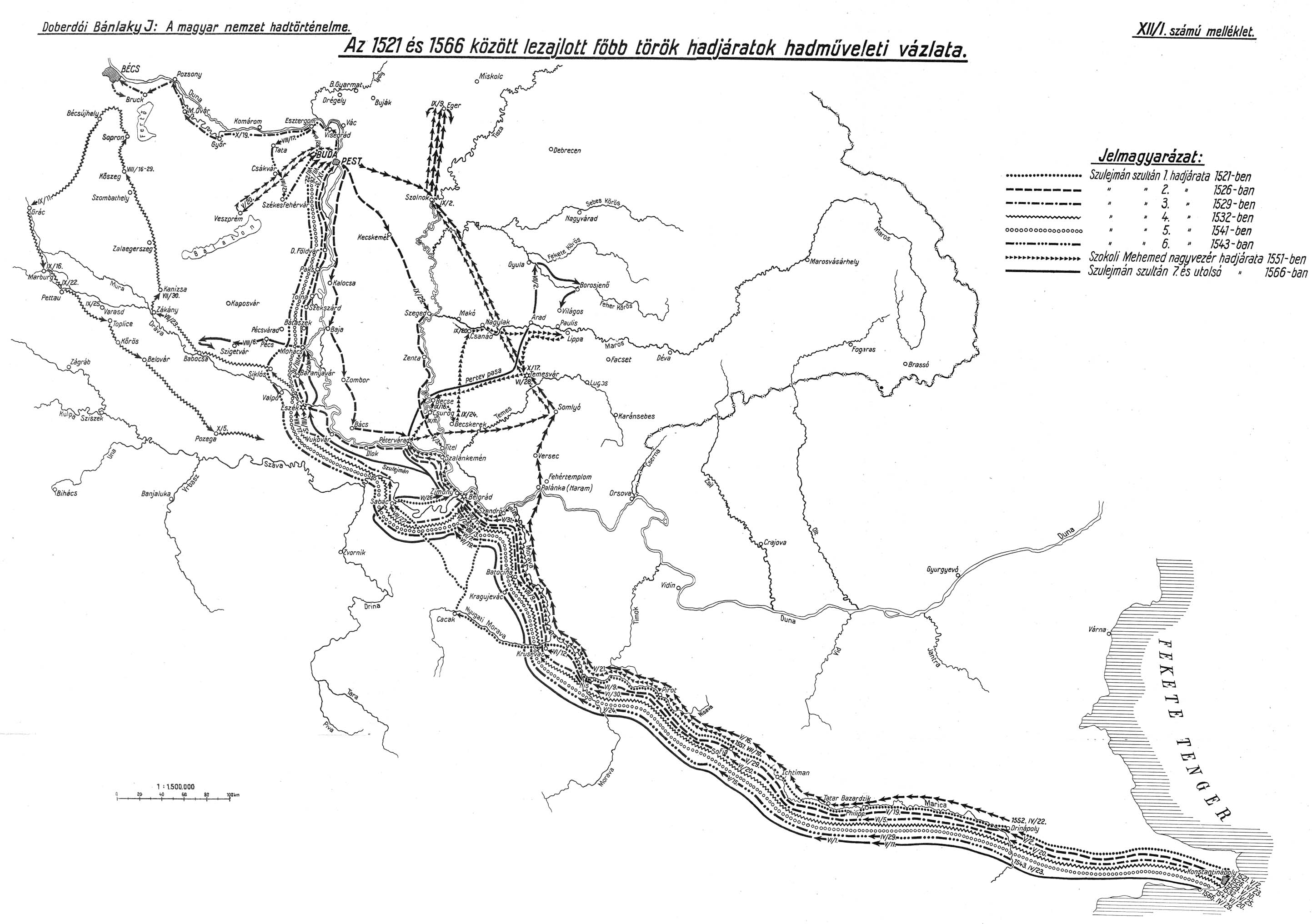
Ottoman attacks in Hungary 1521-1566

=== Siege of Eger ===
The loss of Christian forts at Temesvár and Szolnok in 1552 were blamed on mercenary soldiers within the Hungarian ranks. When the Turks turned their attention to the northern Hungarian town of Eger in the same year, few expected the defenders to put up much resistance, particularly as the two great armies of the Ottoman lords Ahmed and Ali, which had crushed all opposition previously, united before Eger.

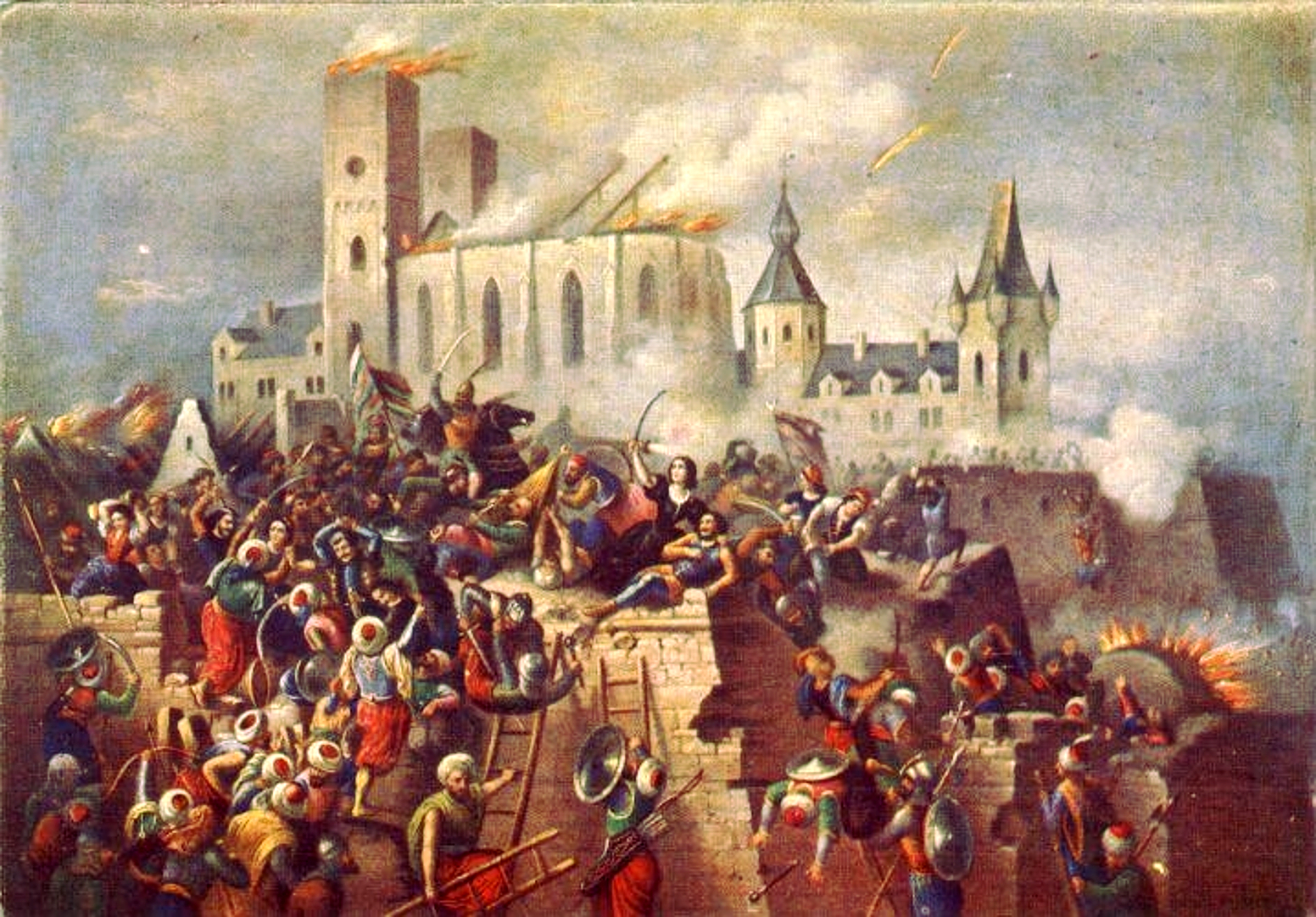
Siege of Eger, 1552

The fortress was defended by 2,100-2,300 people, a mixture of professional soldiers, peasants, and a few dozen women. The defenders were commanded by István Dobó and his deputy István Mekcsey, who had assumed command in 1549. Among the approximately 1,530 combat-ready personnel there were only a handful of foreign mercenaries: Dobó had hired six cannon masters from Germany in order to make the most efficient use of Eger's artillery. Another noted officer, famous in Hungarian literature and folklore, was Gergely Bornemissza. He commanded a detachment of 250 Hungarian infantry; however, it was his skill with explosives that was to make this young officer's name. During the siege, Bornemissza devised primitive but lethal grenades and powderkeg-sized bombs to use against the attackers as well as a water-mill wheel packed with gunpowder which he rolled into the Ottoman ranks. His secret lay in the gunpowder not simply exploding but sparking even more fire. He loaded these weapons with oil, sulfur, and flint in order to shower the enemy with burning missiles.

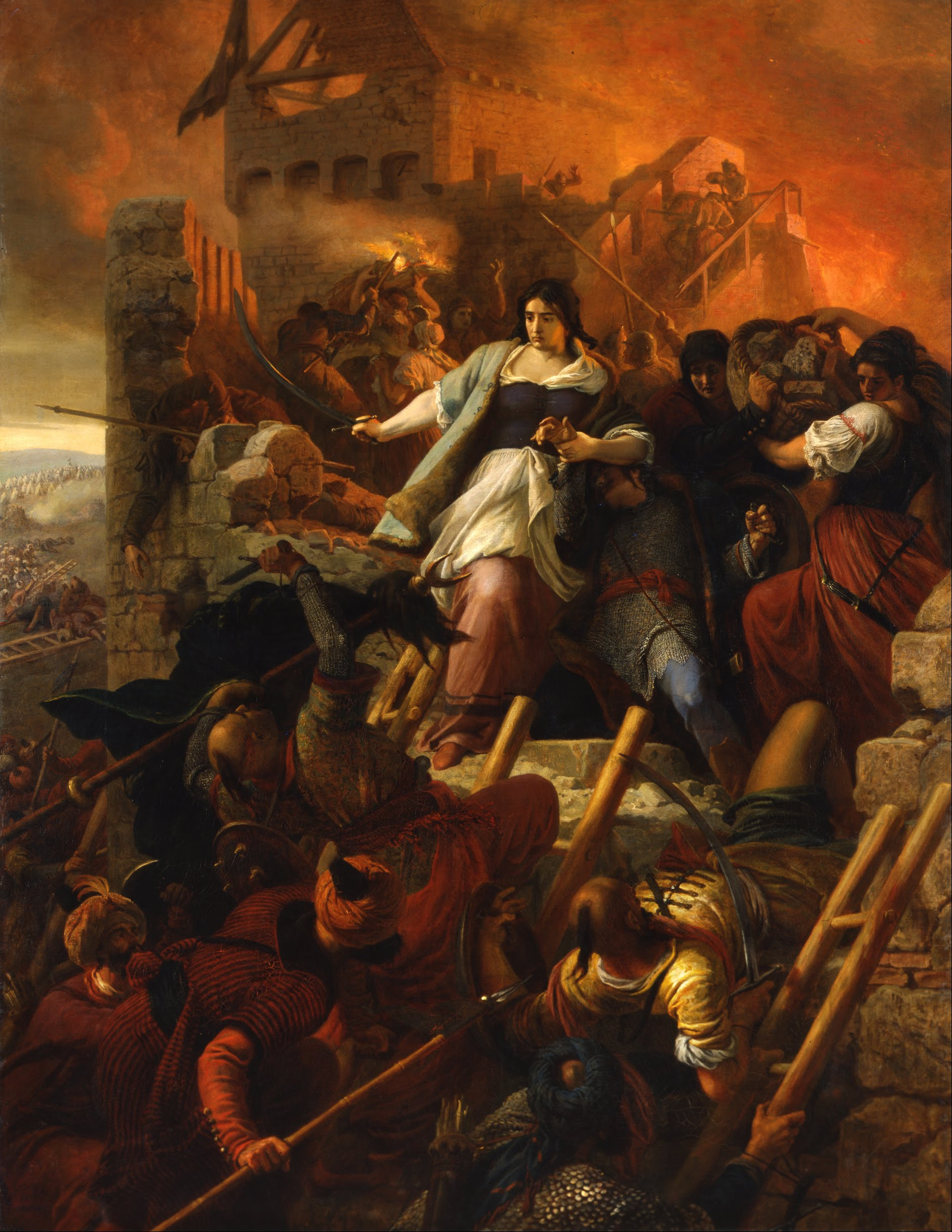
Defence of Eger

The Ottomans had expected an easy victory, but the bravery of the castle's defenders, as well as Dobó's inspired leadership, resulted in their repelling repeated Ottoman assaults. Even after the storage tower containing 24 metric tons of black gunpowder exploded and caused extensive structural damage, the invaders still could not find a way into the castle compound. After 39 days of bloody, brutal, and intense fighting the Ottoman Army withdrew, beaten and humiliated. The defenders' losses amounted to about one-third of their ranks, including those killed and permanently maimed in combat. Dobó lost both of his squires. After the victory Dobó and his officers resigned, in order to protest King Ferdinand's refusal to contribute any material help to the defense. Gergely Bornemissza was appointed to take over command of the fortress.

=== Siege of Pápa Castle ===
There were no secrets on the Borderland: the plans for the Ottoman attack were made known to the Hungarian captains in September. The Turkish troops began to assemble on 22 September. Józsa Ormányi, the captain of Sümeg Castle, noticed this and informed Tamás Nádasdy, the palatine, that the Turkish garrison of Veszprém Castle had been reinforced with 60 horsemen.

Arszlán, Bey of Fehérvár, ordered the peasants of the region to come to Fehérvár with tools, horses and oxen. They were to build the trenches for the siege of Pápa Castle. Nádasdy gave the same order to the peasants around Pápa to reinforce the walls, but his call was ignored. The warriors of the Borderland were alarmed on 22 October 1555. The Turks attacked Pápa on 23 October. At midnight they shouted a terrible battle cry and attacked the gate called Borosgyőri or Szent László. When they heard it, the guards of the gate got scared and fled. Meanwhile, the attackers had pulled down the timbers of the palisade around the gate. Martonfalvy, the scribe, was the first to rush in and grab an infantryman named Péter Borosgyőri by the collar of his coat. He ordered him to fire at the Turks who were pushing through the breach. The Ottomans returned fire and shot through Borosgyőri's hand. Then Martonfalvy rushed to the Landsknechts gathered in Saint László Street and ordered them to run to defend the gate. By this time, the Turks had even planted their flag on the wall above the gate. The mercenaries heard the scribe's order but didn't move. It was the son of Bálint Török, the young Ferenc Török, who made them move. The Landsknechts obeyed him and used their long lances. They quickly cleared the area around the palisade.

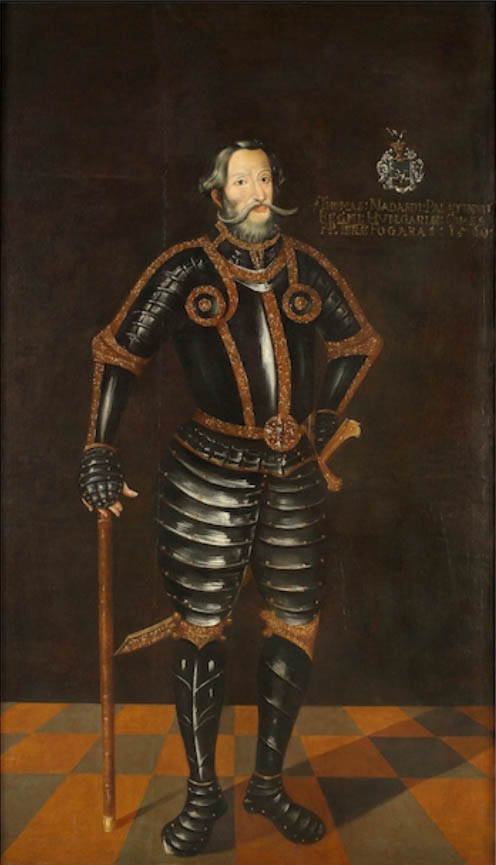
Tamás Nádasdy

The Ottomans made another attempt on the other side of the palisade, but they were met by the dense rifle fire of the defenders. They left many dead bodies and ladders in the moat, and then retreated. On their way back, the Ottomans destroyed the mansion and 25 houses in the village of Zsemlér.

Learning from this incident, the king sent 100 infantrymen to Pápa the following year, along with cannons, gunpowder, and bullets. Tools were also provided and all the peasants of three counties (Veszprém, Vas, and Sopron) were ordered to work on the castle. The king must have realized how close Pápa was to Vienna, because from now on he hired a total of 200 Hungarian warriors and 100 hussars to guard the castle.

The Ottoman warriors of the Trans-Danubian Sanjak districts went to Szigetvár castle to aid the besiegers with their swords. They left only a few soldiers at home and the Hungarian Borderland warriors of the North Trans-Danubia took advantage of the situation. In the second part of June 1556, the Hungarian Hussars of Pápa Castle defeated the Ottomans at Veszprém. After this success, they joined forces with the garrisons of Devecser and Győr castles and launched an attack around the castle of Fehérvár which certainly was a lot stronger fortification.

=== The siege of Szigetvár ===
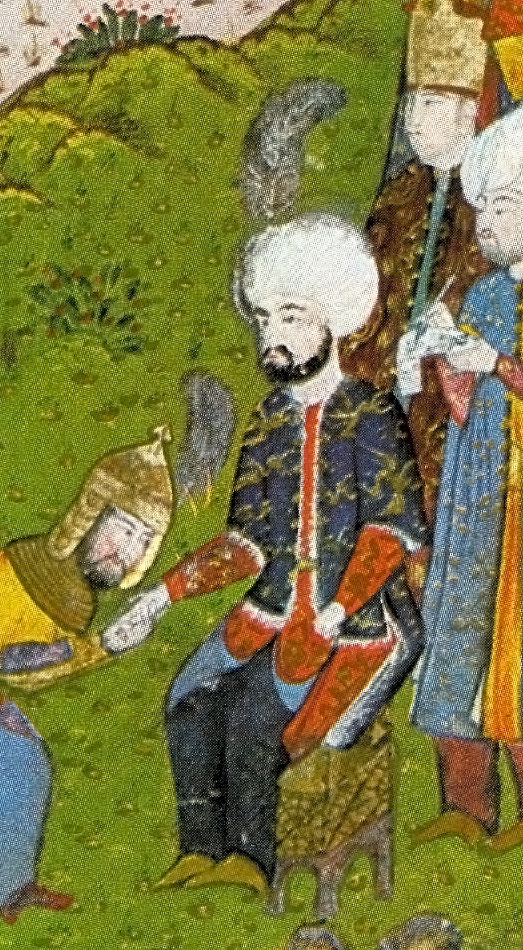
Sokollu Mehmed Pasha receiving enemy troops asking for peace, after the Siege of Temesvár (1552). Futūhāt-i jamīla, Topkapi Palace Museum, H.1592

The siege of Szigetvár castle began on 11 June 1556. At that time, the castle was under the command of Márk Stancsics Horváth, a faithful man of Tamás Nádasdy. He took over the leadership in February in this perilous outpost that was in the throat of the enemy. During the previous year, the Ottoman Turks had taken Kaposvár, Korotna, and Babócsa castles and it was quite likely that they would turn against Szigetvár.

Beylerbey Pasha Hadim Ali of Buda castle had set out from Istanbul in April with several thousand Janissaries, and the Ottoman sanjak beys of the South-Hungarian Ottoman Lands were trying to disturb the Hungarians defenders to get ready for the coming siege. There were Bey Dervis of Pécs, Bey Ahmed of Babócsa, Bej Nászuf of Koppány, as well as Bey Mehmed of Szolnok whose soldiers were gathering near Szentlőrinc. The Ottoman raiding parties tried to block the Hungarians who were filling up the castle with supplies. They were not successful, though, because the Hussars of Szigetvár could chase them away. In Szigetvár, there were only 600 soldiers and 200 burghers who were willing to take up arms. Together with other folks, there were about 1,000 defenders. Further 3,000 people sought refuge in the town, and there was not enough food for them. Szigetvár castle consisted of three parts: the inner- and outer castles, and the old town that was surrounded by a wall. Luckily, the moats were full of water.

The enemy arrived in the evening hours of 10 June but the defenders did not give them a rest and killed many of them. The Ottomans made camps on the southern and eastern sides of Szigetvár and the Akinji light cavalry surrounded the fort, cutting it off from the countryside. The siege began on 11 June in earnest. The cannons were deployed on the next day, they were facing the southern walls of the town. The bombardment started on the morning of 12 June. The defenders were able to hinder the artillery fire by sallies but they could not stop them. Parallel with this, the enemy herded Hungarian peasants to dig trenches. The first general assault was launched on 21 June. The defenders repelled the waves of attacks four times but the fifth was successful, and the besiegers could take the town. However, Sebestyén Újlaky and Voivode Jakab Radován led the defenders to launch a counter-attack, and they carried out great destruction amid the Ottomans. After several hours of fierce battle, the defenders had to withdraw. Fortunately, the reinforcing Christian army was coming together at Kanizsa castle, led by Tamás Nádsady and Pallavicini Sforza. It was encouraging to the exhausted defenders. During the systematic siege, the warriors of Captain Horváth sallied from time to time to disturb the besieging Ottomans who had lost much of their eagerness by this time. The reinforcing army reached Babócsa castle on 18 July and besieged it. Hearing this, Hadim Ali had to lift the siege of Szigetvár.

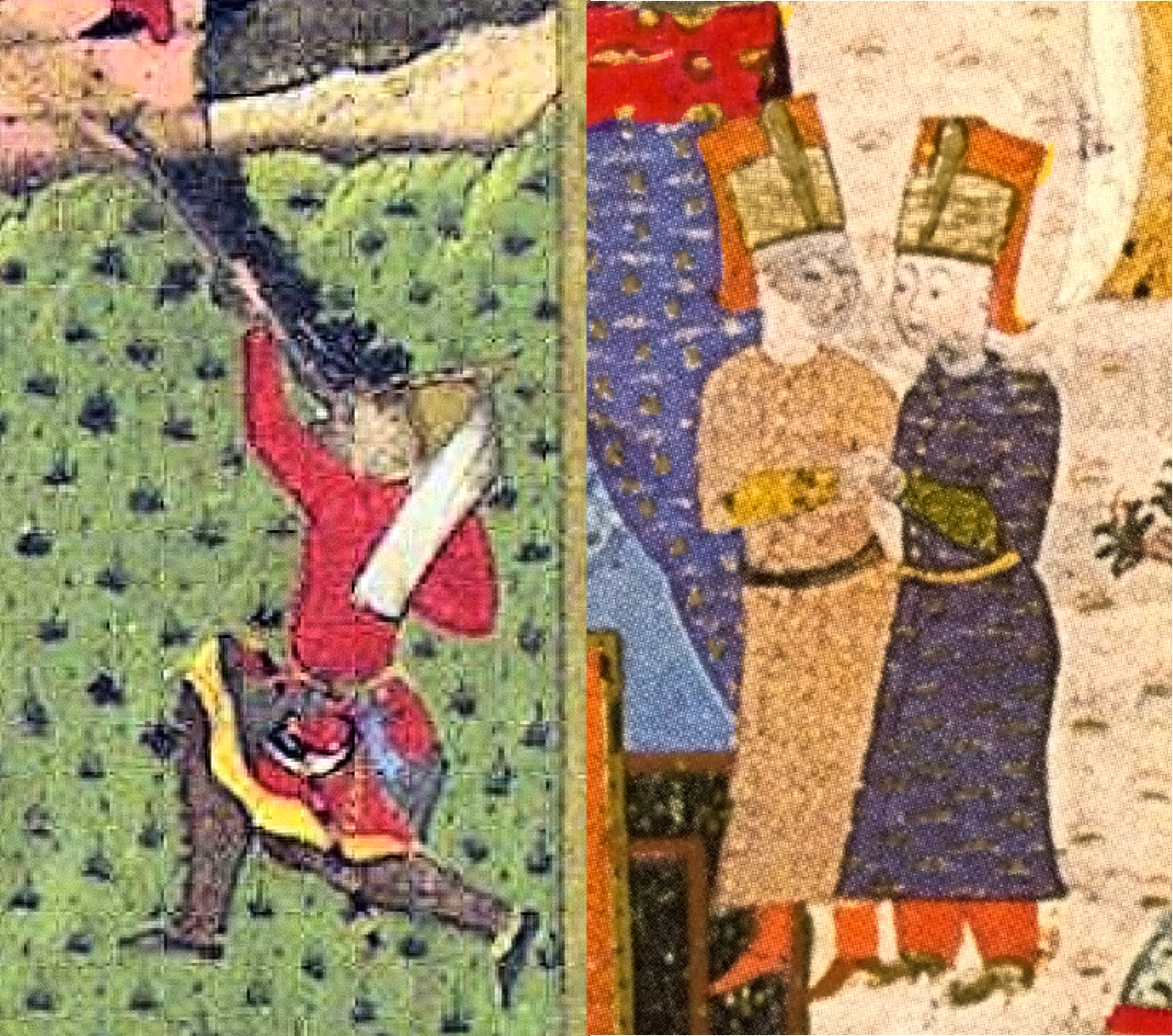
Ottoman Janissaries in 1558. Futūhāt-i jamīla. TSMK H. 1592

=== Turkish attack around Lake Balaton ===
In 1558 the military of the Transdanubian Sanjak centers became active and tried to extend their authority to the smaller castles around Lake Balaton. This was part of the Ottoman strategy of conquest, which gradually pushed out the new frontiers. The area around the enemy's castles was gradually destroyed, cutting them off from supplies and instilling fear in the population, who were either forced to pay taxes or driven off their land.

At worst, they were slaughtered or taken away as slaves. Softening up enemy territory was an old strategy before major campaigns, and it usually worked. These small-scale battles were commonplace from the very first appearance of the Turks, whether officially at peace or in open warfare. The difference was that in the case of ‘peace’, the opposing sides could not mobilize as many troops, and the use of artillery and besieging castles was forbidden.

But the Hungarians knew this too. The incessant attacks led to the formation of Hussar units, which proved to be a very capable force against the conquerors. As early as March, Nicholas IV Zrinski reported to Palatine Tamás Nádasdy that the Turks were fortifying the Mesztegnyő monastery. In the summer they wanted to build a fortress from the church of Ságvár, but the Turkish garrison was ambushed by Captain Mihály Takaró, who was crossing Lake Balaton. The palisade was occupied, but the defenders locked in the tower were no match for him, as the Turkish guards of Kőröshegy came to the aid of the people of Ságvár. Takaró and his troops managed to escape across the lake.

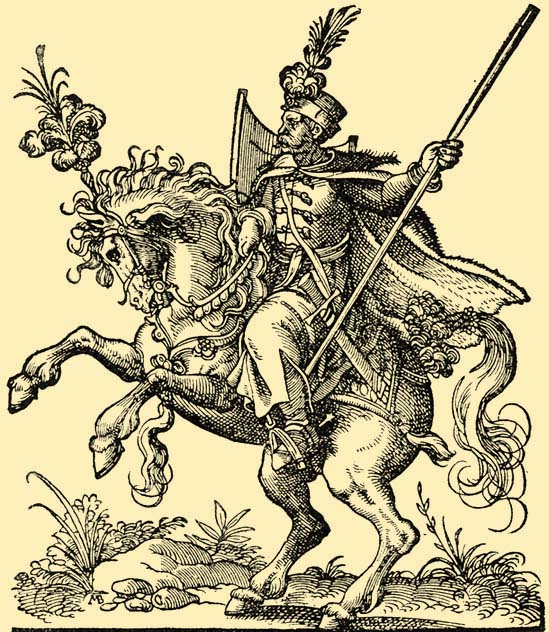
Hungarian Hussar

Then, perhaps to avenge the previous incident, the Turks of Veszprém, Simontornya, and Koppány took action. Around 13 October, they simultaneously attacked the outlying castles north and south of Lake Balaton. In a single night, the Veszprém troops raided the castles of Vázsonykő, Hegyesd, and Csobánc, and struck at Szigliget. The entire population of the village was taken prisoner. Although the Szigliget garrison fled from the castle, the Turks soon overpowered them. Bálint Magyar, the captain of the castle, almost lost his head, and it was only by the special grace of the Lord that he escaped.

He then wrote a letter of complaint to Nádasdy, blaming the guards of Vázsonykő, Csobánc, and Hegyesd for being taken by surprise by the Turks, who had not signaled the enemy's approach. In fact, the Hungarian commanders of the surrounding castles were on extremely hostile terms with each other, allowing the Turks to slip through the defenses almost unnoticed.

In the same days, the Turks of Simontornya and Koppány attacked the castle of Fonyód, also under the command of Bálint. They broke through the outer palisade and set fire to the houses, but were driven out by the guards. Three Turks were captured, nine slaughtered and many wounded. The castle of Tihany was attacked three times by the Turks of Veszprém and Fehérvár, each time with a considerable number of infantry, to take the castle. The raids continued in the following years. Fonyód was attacked several times, and in 1561 Hegyesd was also assaulted. This finally brought together the commanders of the surrounding castles, and a joint operation drove the Turks out of Hegyesd the following year.

=== Further Ottoman raids ===
At the Great Military Council of the Imperial War Council in 1577, on the advice of Lazarus von Schwendi, it was decided to focus on active defense rather than offensive strategy. A new Borderland defense line, a system of fortifications on several levels, stood in the way of Turkish expansion.

Main castles, headquarters of general captaincies, usually well-established fortifications with at least 1000 defenders were established. Their task was to hold out for at least a month or a month and a half until the relief army arrived. Secondary castles were built to support the main castle, to hold out for a few weeks, and to delay the enemy's advance. Their number generally varied between 100 and 500. Their layout varied. Fortresses of the third class were also built, most of them were palisaded, with a guard of about 100 men. Under siege, of course, they had more defenders. Their role was to control raids and support the larger castles. They could only hold off a raiding army without artillery for a few days at most.

== Aftermath ==
Finally, a truce had to be made on 12 April 1562, according to the “status quo”. Except for Munkács and Huszt castle and their area. However, the Ottoman allies did not keep the truce. They besieged Szatmár castle where Zay and Balassa took themselves in. As the Turks had no siege engines, they wanted to starve them out. Indeed, the defenders’ situation became grave at the end of April. The defenders sent Balassa to get help from the royal army that was at Olcsvaapáti. Balassa got in a boat and rowed through the besiegers’ camp at night on 27 April. Upon his arrival in the royal army's camp, he wrote a letter to Archduke Maximilian to send aid. He also sent a letter to László Kerecsényi, captain of Gyula castle.

At last, the people of Szatmár castle could escape from sure death because Zsigmond János interceded with the Ottomans, referring to the truce. Then, the Ottomans lifted the siege on 4 May and left for home. Balassa and Zay were able to secure Ferdinand's rule in the region for a further two years but it caused the devastation of the land.

== See also ==
- Ottoman-Habsburg Wars
- Suleiman the Magnificent
- List of wars involving Hungary
- List of wars involving Austria
- List of wars involving the Ottoman Empire
