= Lantern shield =

Circular light during the Italian Renaissance

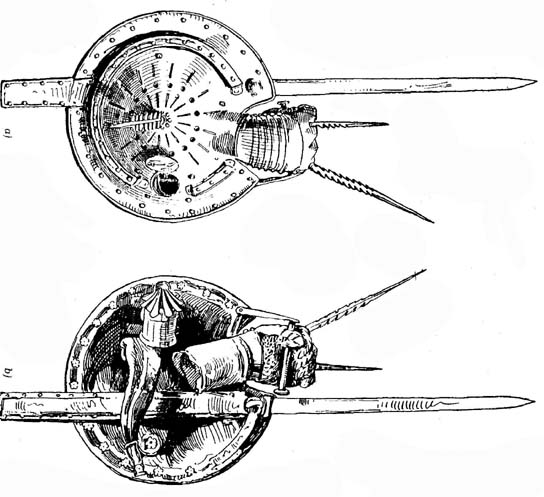
Lantern shield

The lantern shield is a small shield combined with a lantern used during the Italian Renaissance (15th and 16th century Italy) especially for night time duels. A number of specimens survive. Their defining feature is a small circular shield – a buckler – combined with a lantern, or a hook from which to hang a lantern, intended to blind the opponent at night or in duels fought at dawn.

Some more elaborate examples might incorporate gauntlets, spikes, sword blades, and also a mechanism to alternatively darken or release the light of the lantern.

The most peculiar example is the one now kept at the Kunsthistorisches Museum in Vienna, made in the 1540s.

Swordsmen dueling at dawn are reported to have carried lanterns during the 16th and 17th centuries, and fencing manuals of the period integrated the lantern into their lessons, using it to parry blows and blind the opponent. The manuals sometimes show the combatants carrying the lantern in the left hand wrapped behind the back.

It is believed that the lantern shield was never actually used in combat, but rather for patrolling Italian city streets at night.

The lantern halberd and lantern pistol are other weapons with an integrated lantern. The lantern pistol is an 18th or 19th century flintlock pistol shield and there are two known versions.

== See also ==
- Pata (weapon)
- Hungarian shield
