= Treaty of Constantinople (1562) =

Treaty between the Ottoman Empire and the Holy Roman Empire

In 1562, Holy Roman Emperor Ferdinand I and the Ottoman Sultan Suleiman I formalized a truce made in 1547 between the Holy Roman Empire and the Ottoman Empire.

The treaty confirmed that the Ottoman Empire kept its gains in central Hungary, while the western and northern Hungary remained under Habsburg rule. The treaty confirmed that Transylvania remained under Ottoman control.

== See also ==
- List of treaties

== Sources ==
- Mikaberidze, Alexander (2011). "Treaty of Constantinople (1562)". In Mikaberidze, Alexander (ed.). Conflict and Conquest in the Islamic World: A Historical Encyclopedia. Vol. I: A-K. ABC-CLIO.
