= Buckler =

Small shield

External images
- Buckler(small version, 15th Century Style)
- Bucklers in training

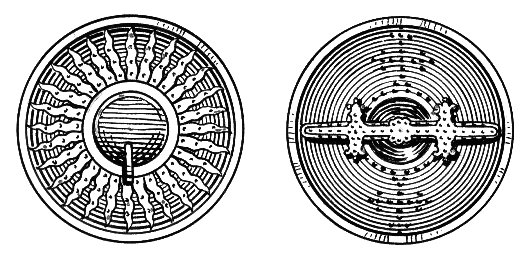
Buckler front and back

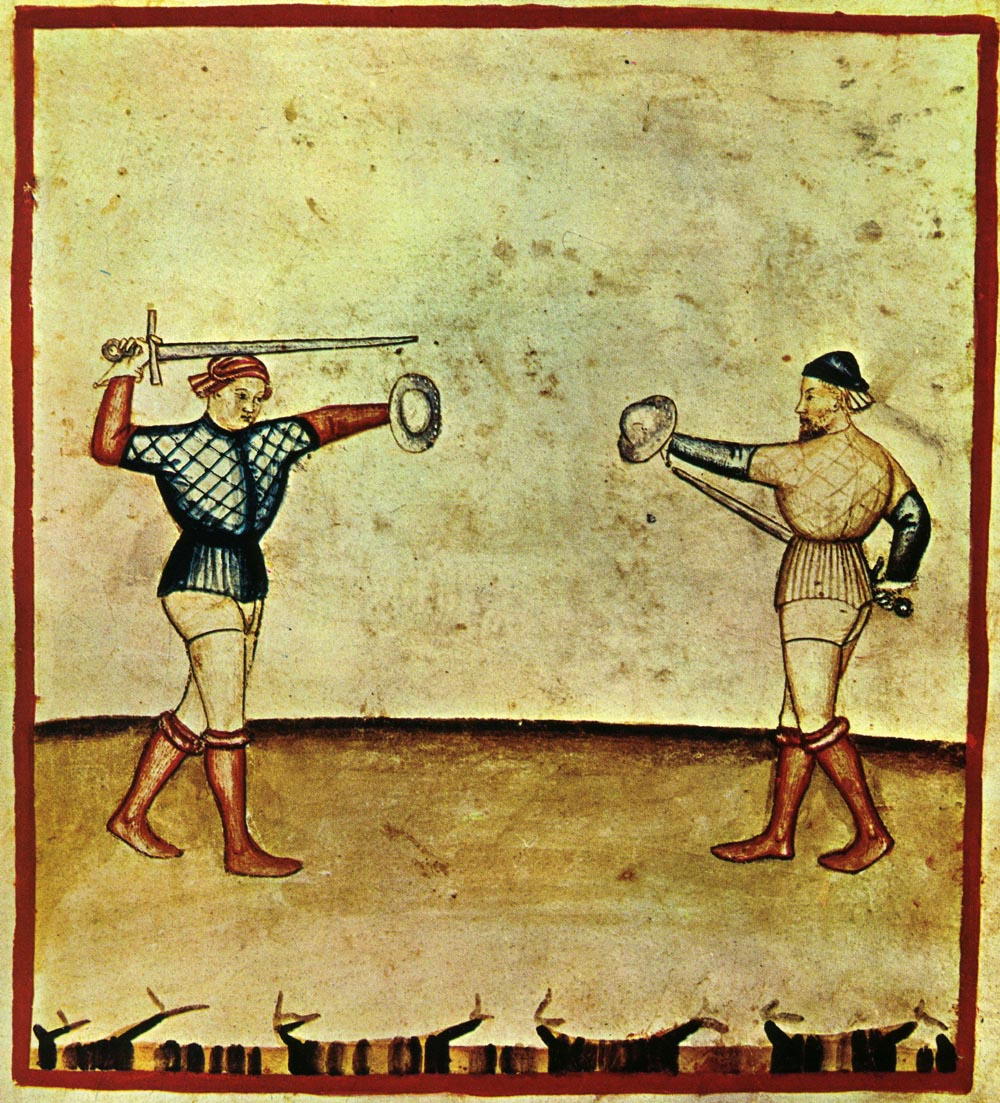
Sword and buckler combat, plate from the Tacuinum Sanitatis illustrated in Lombardy, ca. 1390.

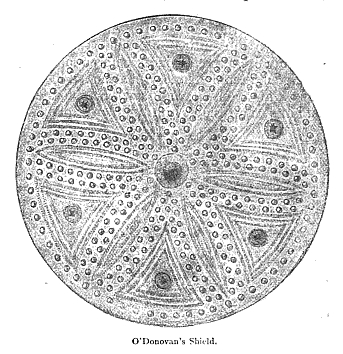
Irish round shield

A buckler (French bouclier 'shield', from Old French bocle, boucle 'boss') is a small shield, up to 45 cm (18 in) in diameter, gripped in the fist with a central handle behind the boss. It became more common as a companion weapon in hand-to-hand combat during the Medieval and Renaissance periods. Its size made it poor protection against missile weapons (e.g., arrows) but useful in deflecting the blow of an opponent's weapons, binding their arms, hindering their movements, or punching them.

Royal Armouries Ms. I.33 (c.1300 A.D.), considered the earliest extant armed-combat manual, describes a system of combat with buckler and sword.

== Uses ==
The buckler was widely used, a simple yet effective weapon, often combined with an arming sword, falchion, or rapier. It was popular circa 1100 to 1600. The buckler had a variety of roles when it came to swordplay, but six principal means come to the fore as described in MS I.33. Each use recognizes the shield's small size and maneuverability when dealing with light blades.

- Hand protection: The primary use of the buckler was to protect the sword hand.
- "Floating armor": Another significant use of the buckler was to hold it facing the opponent with the arm outstretched, when not actively using it for something else. This restricts the areas open to attack by the opponent by closing the line of attack between the opponent's sword and most of wielder's torso and sword arm.
- Deflector: The buckler's lightness and curved center made it excellent for deflecting attacking blades.
- Blinder: The light blades used in conjunction with the buckler depended on rapid movements, which meant that a single second was an important advantage. The wielder of the buckler could use the buckler to shield his sword-hand's position from view, keeping his opponent from guessing his next strike.
- "Metal fist": A buckler could be used to directly attack an opponent by punching with either its flat face or its rim.
- Binder: The buckler could be used to bind an opponent's sword hand and weapon as well as their buckler against their body. The buckler was also very useful in grappling, where it allowed an opponent's arms to be easily wrapped up and controlled.

== Decoration ==
In classical antiquity, bucklers on medals were either used to signify public vows rendered to the gods for the safety of a prince, or that he was esteemed the defender and protector of his people: these were called votive bucklers, and were hung at altars, etc.

== See also ==
- Adarga
- Hungarian shield
- Lantern shield
- Rodeleros (lit., "shield bearers", also known as "sword and buckler men")
- Swashbuckler
- Targe
- Buckler (surname)
- Parikaoba (ru:Парикаоба) — traditional Caucasian fencing with shashka and buckler
