= Siege of Temesvár (1552) =

1552 siege

- Part of the Habsburg–Ottoman war of 1551–1562
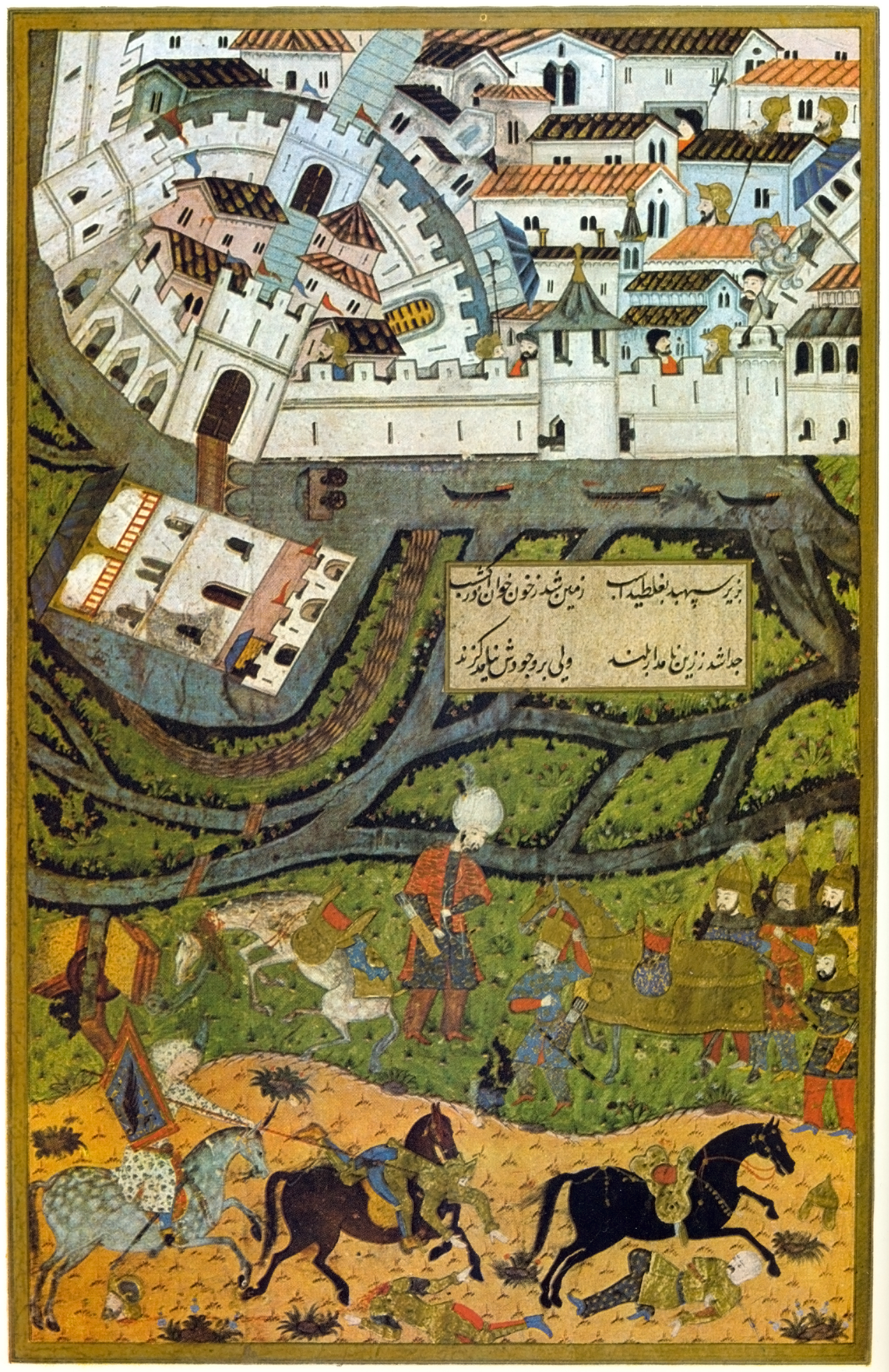
- The siege in Futūhāt-i jamīla. Istanbul, Topkapi Palace Museum, H. 1592.
Date	24 June – 27 July 1552
Location	Temesvár, Kingdom of Hungary (today Timișoara, Romania)
Result	Ottoman victory

Belligerents
Ottoman Empire	Hungarian, Czech, German and Spanish defenders

Commanders and leaders
Sokollu Mehmed Pasha; Kara Ahmed Pasha	István Losonci (executed)

Strength
30,000	1,900

Casualties and losses
Unknown	Heavy

The siege of Temesvár was a military conflict between the Habsburg monarchy and the Ottoman Empire in 1552. The siege resulted with a decisive Ottoman victory and Temesvár came under Ottoman control for 164 years.

== Background ==
After the Battle of Mohács in 1526, the Hungarian Kingdom split into two parts. The western part of the country came under the control of Ferdinand I from the House of Habsburg, the eastern side came under the control of John Zápolya, a Hungarian noble. Zápolya asked the for help of Ottoman emperor Suleiman the Magnificent against Ferdinand. After the death of John in 1540, he was succeeded by his one-month-old son, John Sigismund Zápolya. Ferdinand in 1541 tried to capture Buda, the capital, but he was defeated by Suleiman's army. The Ottoman emperor occupied Buda after the victory and sent the young Hungarian king with his court to Lippa (today Lipova, Romania); in 1542 they moved to Gyulafehérvár (today Alba Iulia, Romania), which later became the capital of the Principality of Transylvania.

Even after this event, Ferdinand didn't give up his dream about the unification of the Hungarian Kingdom under his rule. With George Martinuzzi's help, the eastern part of the country in 1550 came under Habsburg rule, which caused the attack of the Ottoman army against Hungary.

In 1552 two Ottoman armies crossed the border into the Hungarian Kingdom. One of them – led by Hadim Ali Pasha – started a campaign against the western and central part of the country whilst the second army – led by Kara Ahmed Pasha – attacked the fortresses in the Banat region.

== Siege ==
In the summer of 1552, the Ottomans arrived at Temesvár, which was the most important city in the Banat region. The Ottoman army numbered about 30,000 men, Temesvár was defended only by 1,900 men, 700 of whom were merchants.

The Ottoman artillery started destroying the wall on 27 June, then the Ottoman infantry assaulted the wall on 3 July and 6 July, without any success. At the time of the battle, a Hungarian army led by Mihály Tóth tried to liberate the city under the siege, but his army was defeated in the battle of Szentandrás (today Sânandrei, Romania). The city fell soon after.

== Aftermath ==
After the capture of Temesvár, the sultan established the Temeşvar Eyalet which was composed of four sanjaks. Temesvár remained under Ottoman control even after the Treaty of Karlowitz and was recaptured by the Christian forces only in 1717.
