= Futūhāt-i jamīla =

- Siege of Pecs with Sokollu Mehmed Pasha leading his troops in 1551. Futūhāt-i jamīla of Arifi. Istanbul, Topkapi Palace Museum, H. 1592, fol. 5a.
- Author: Arifi
- Publication date: 1557-1558

The Futūhāt-i jamīla, also Futuhat-ı Cemile ("Admirable Conquests", TSMK H.1592) was an illustrated manuscript by Arifi about 1557–1558. It relates the battles of the Ottoman-Habsburgs war in Transylvania in 1551.

The manuscript has thirty-one folios and six illustrations, including one illustration that spreads on two pages.

One of the main protagonists is Sokollu Mehmed Pasha, who praised for his bravery and accomplishments throughout the text. He is depicted in various scenes, from the attack on the castles of Pecs and Lipva, to the scene of a council before his tent, or his reception of receiving Habsburg envoys asking for peace. Sokollu appears in the illustration of the siege of Pecs Castle, leading his men on horseback, in front of the city undergoing a siege.

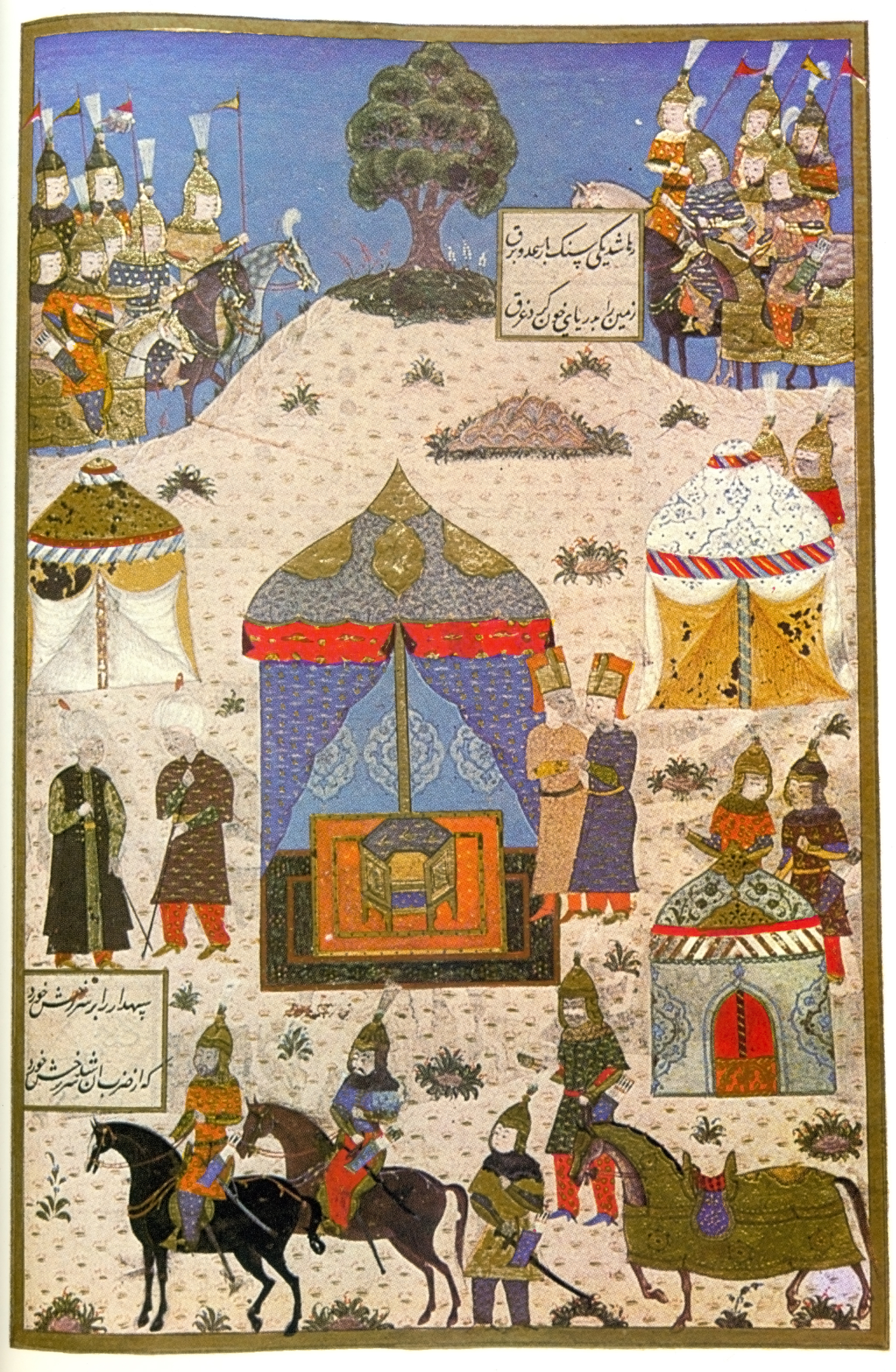
Siege of Temesvár, 1552

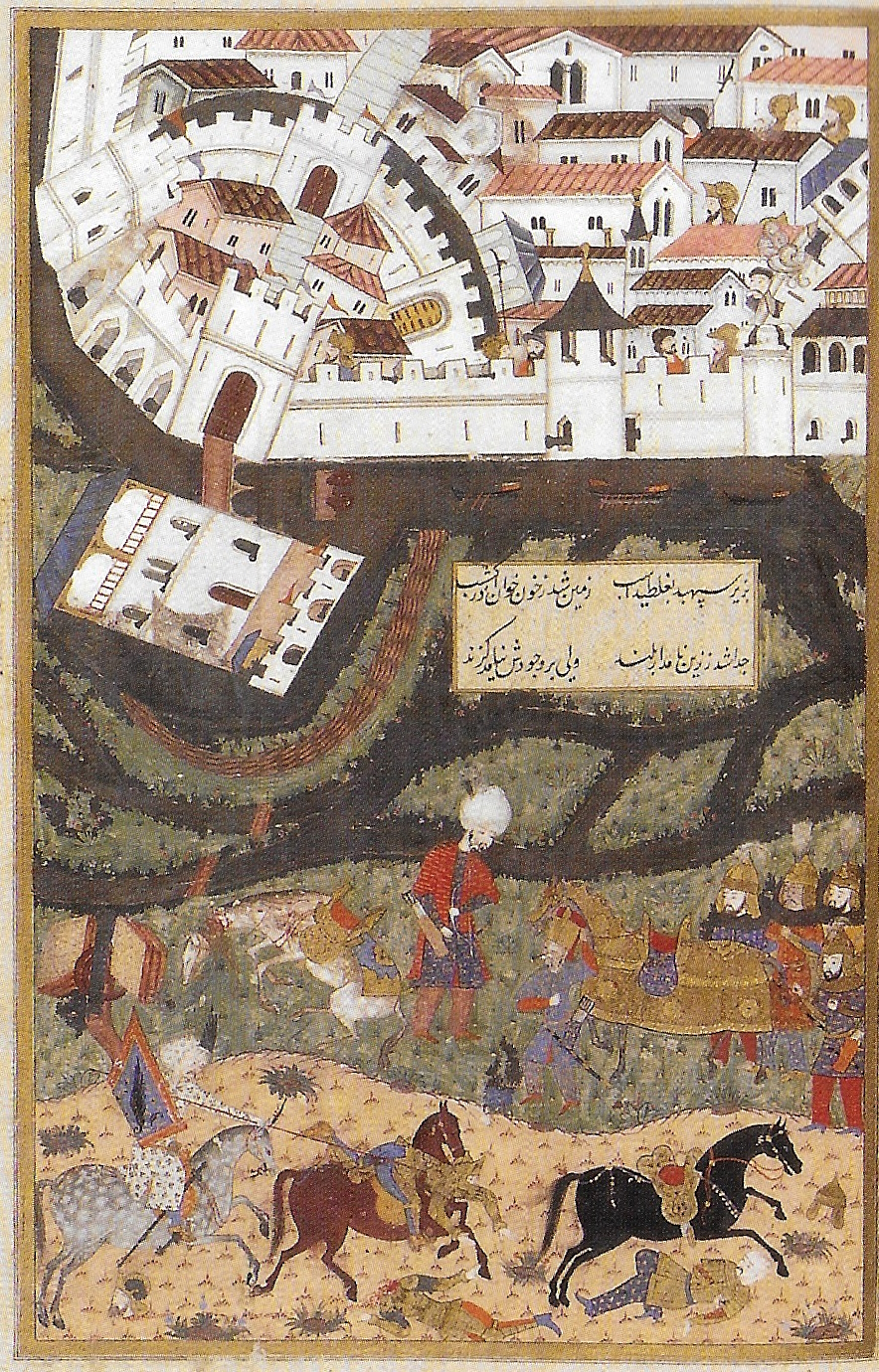
Kara Ahmed Pasha at the Siege of Temesvár, 1552

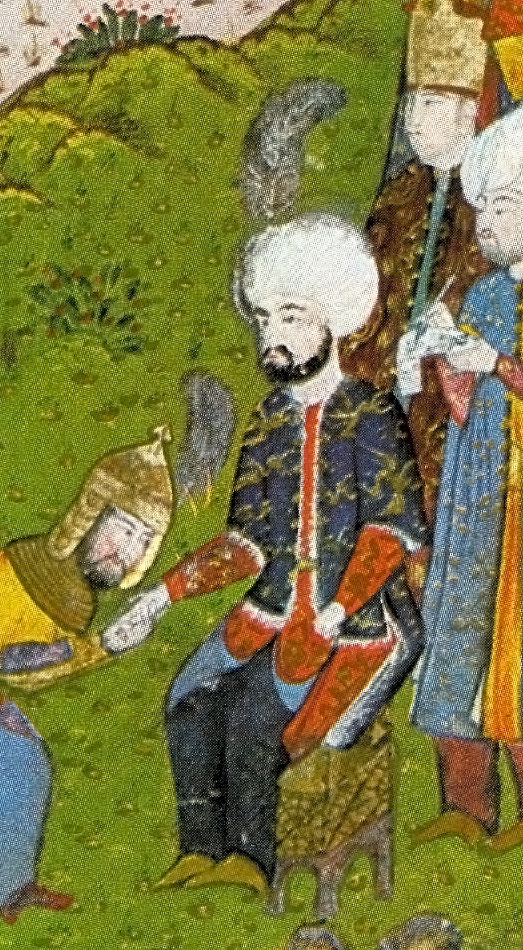
Sokollu Mehmed Pasha after the victory at Temesvár, 1552

== Sources ==
- Holliday, Peter J. (2024). Power, Image, and Memory: Historical Subjects in Art. Oxford University Press. ISBN 978-0-19-090108-0.
