= Kara Ahmed Pasha =

Grand Vizier of the Ottoman Empire from 1553 to 1555

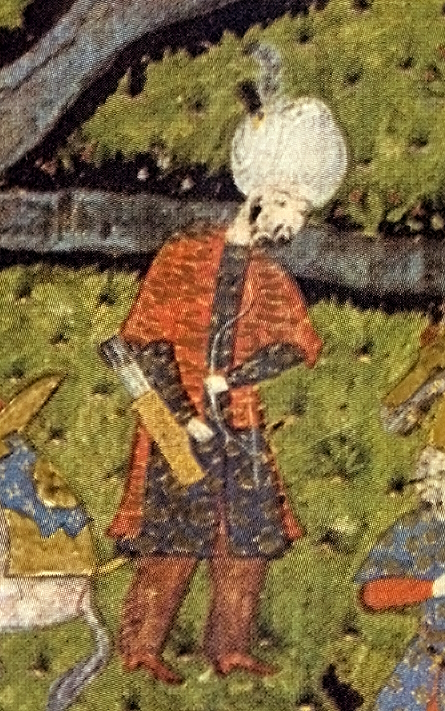
- Kara Ahmed Pasha changing horses at the Siege of Temesvár (1552). Futūhāt-i jamīla.

33rd Grand Vizier of the Ottoman Empire
- In office 6 October 1553 – 29 September 1555
- Monarch: Suleiman I
- Preceded by: Rüstem Pasha
- Succeeded by: Rüstem Pasha

Personal details
- Died: 29 September 1555 Istanbul, Ottoman Empire (modern Turkey)
- Spouse: Fatma Sultan (m. 1522)
- Children: Two daughters (?)

Kara Ahmed Pasha (executed 29 September 1555) was an Ottoman statesman who served as Grand Vizier between October 1553 and September 1555.

== Career ==
Ahmed was of Albanian origin. He was brought up in the Topkapı Palace and became the Agha of the Janissaries in 1521. He married Fatma Sultan, the daughter of Sultan Selim I in 1522.

In 1543, while the beylerbey of Rumelia, he participated in the Hungarian campaign. He was appointed the commander-in-chief of the war against Persia in 1548.

He led the Ottoman troops that captured the Hungarian fortress of Temesvár, defended by the troop of István Losonczy, on 26 July 1552. That year, his army took three other castles (Veszprém, Szolnok and Lipova) before failing at the siege of Eger.

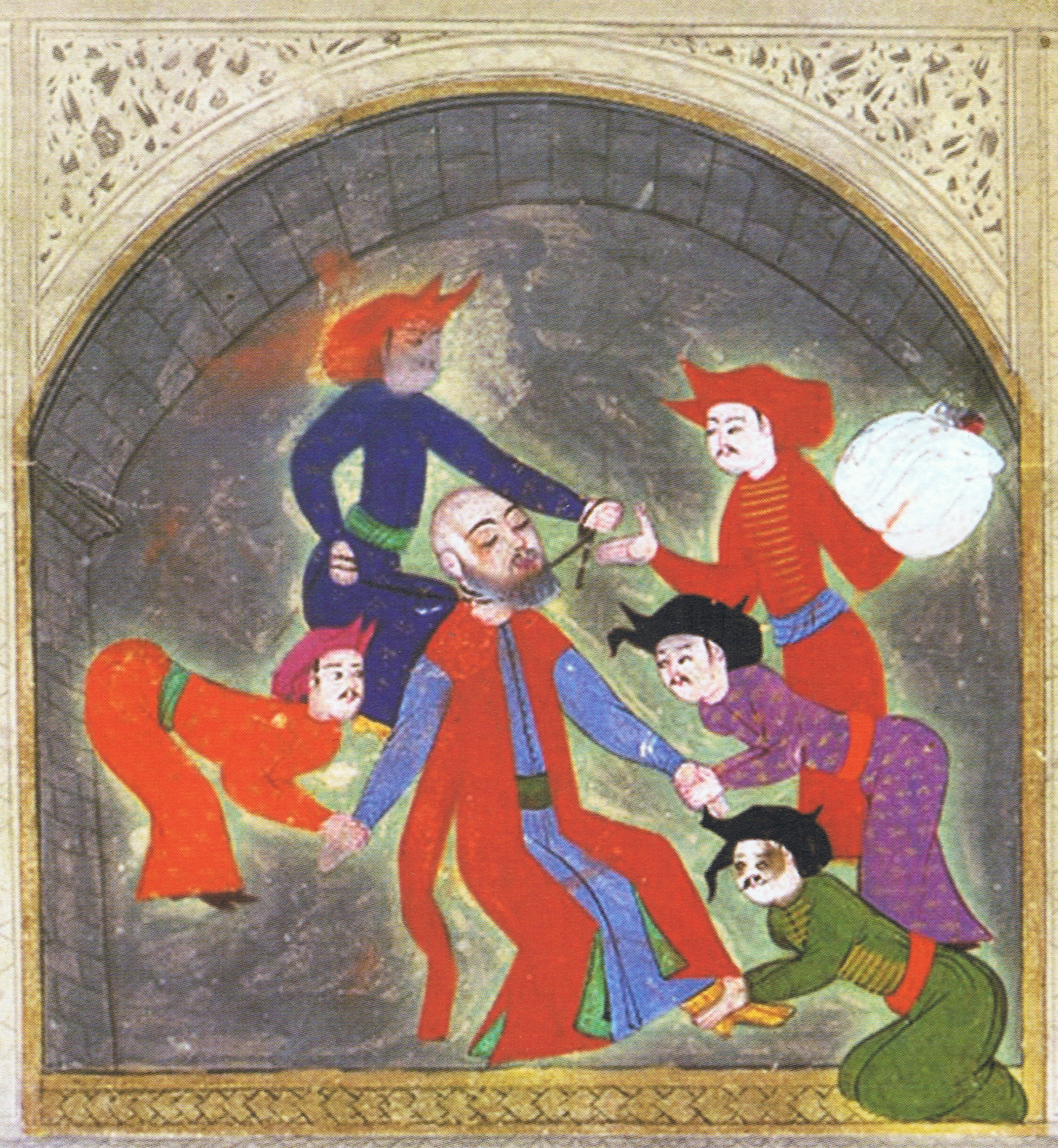
Execution of Kara Ahmed Pasa. Hünername H.1524, f.176b.

After Sultan Suleiman executed his eldest son Şehzade Mustafa in October 1553, there appeared some sort of dissatisfaction and unrest among soldiers who blamed Rüstem Pasha for Mustafa's death. Then Suleiman dismissed Rüstem Pasha and appointed Kara Ahmed Pasha as his Grand Vizier in October 1553. Ahmed Pasha had previously been the second Vizier. But almost two years later, Kara Ahmed was strangled to death on Suleiman's order on 29 September 1555. It is said that the reason for the execution was due to political manoeuvrings of Suleiman's legal wife Hürrem Sultan, who wanted her son-in-law Rüstem to become the Grand Vizier again. After the death of Kara Ahmed, Rüstem Pasha became the Grand Vizier (1555–1561) once more.

== Legacy ==
In the TV series Muhteşem Yüzyıl, Kara Ahmed Pasha is played by Turkish actor Yetkin Dikinciler.

== See also ==
- List of Ottoman grand viziers

Political offices
Preceded by Rüstem Pasha	Grand Vizier of the Ottoman Empire; 6 October 1553 – 29 September 1555	Succeeded by Rüstem Pasha
