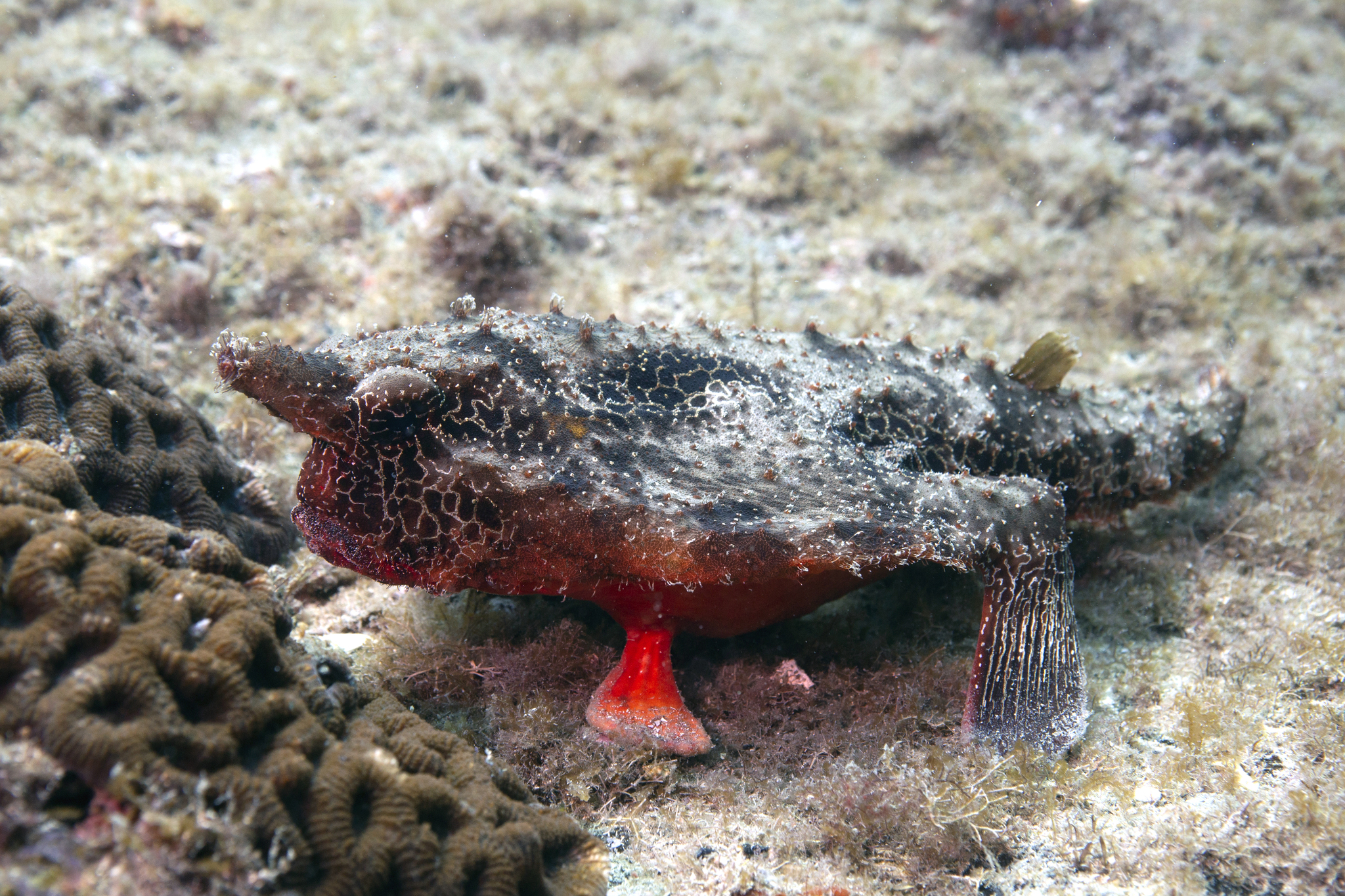

Conservation status
- Least Concern (IUCN 3.1)

Scientific classification
- Kingdom: Animalia
- Phylum: Chordata
- Class: Actinopterygii
- Division: Teleostei
- Order: Lophiiformes
- Family: Ogcocephalidae
- Genus: Ogcocephalus
- Species: O. vespertilio

Binomial name
- Ogcocephalus vespertilio (Linnaeus, 1758)

Synonyms
- Lophius vespertilio Linnaeus, 1758; Malthaea longirostris Valenciennes, 1837

= Ogcocephalus vespertilio =

Species of fish

Ogcocephalus vespertilio, the Brazilian batfish or seadevil, is a species of marine ray-finned fish belonging to the family Ogcocephalidae, the deep sea batfishes. This species is found in the Western Atlantic Ocean. The Brazilian batfish is the type species of the genus Ogcocephalus.

== Nomenclature ==
Ogcocephalus vespertilio is the type species of the genus Ogcocephalus, the name of which is a combination of ogkos, which means "hook", and cephalus, meaning "head", an allusion to the pointed rostrum on the snout of the type species. The specific name vespertilio, means "bat", this probably goes back to the name "Sea Bat", a common name probably first mentioned in Patrick Browne's Civil and Natural History of Jamaica published in 1756, which said "by the extension of its side-fins and its small ventrals, represents a bat in some measure, whence its name".

=== Taxonomy ===
Ogcocephalus vespertilio was first formally described as Lophius vespertilio by Carl Linnaeus in the 10th edition of Systema Naturae with its type locality given as the "American Ocean". In 1813 Gotthelf Fischer von Waldheim proposed the genus Ogcocephalus and in 1896 David Starr Jordan and Barton Warren Evermann designated Linnaeus's L. vespertilio as the type species of this genus. The genus Ogcocephalus is classified within the "Eastern Pacific/Western Atlantic clade" of the family Ogcocephalidae. The family Ogcocephalidae is classified in the monotypic suborder Ogcocephaloidei within the order Lophiiformes, the anglerfishes in the 5th edition of Fishes of the World.

== Description ==
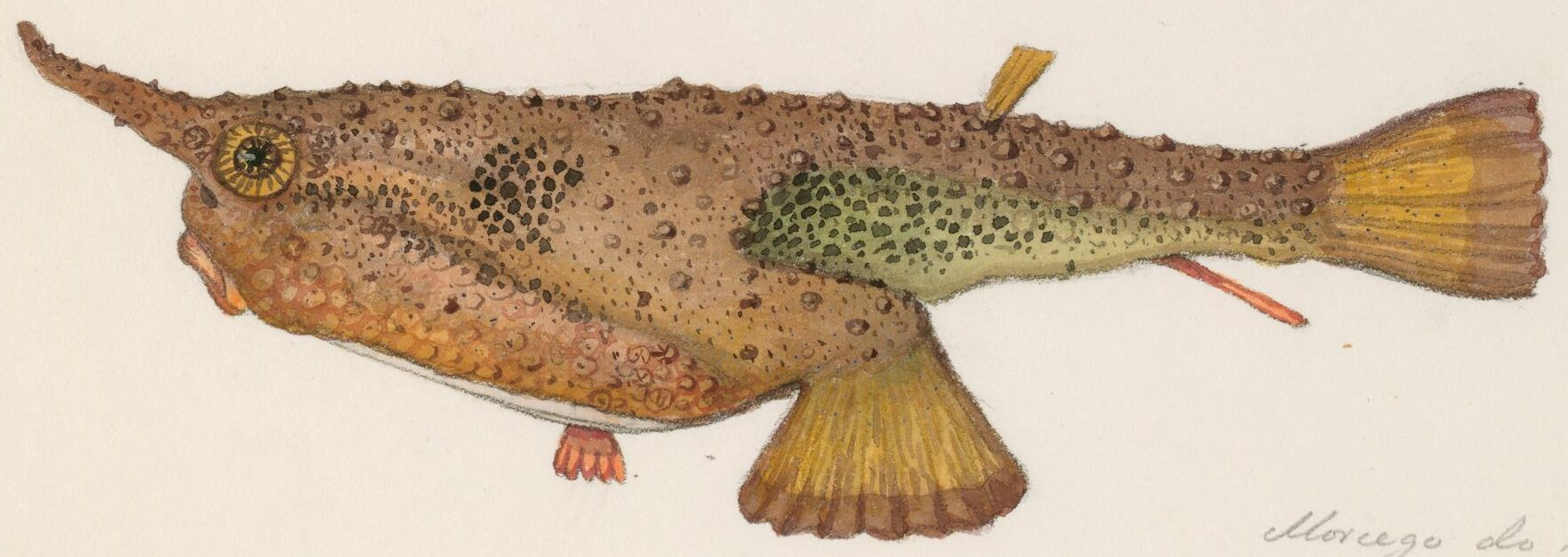
Watercolor; Jacques Burkhardt

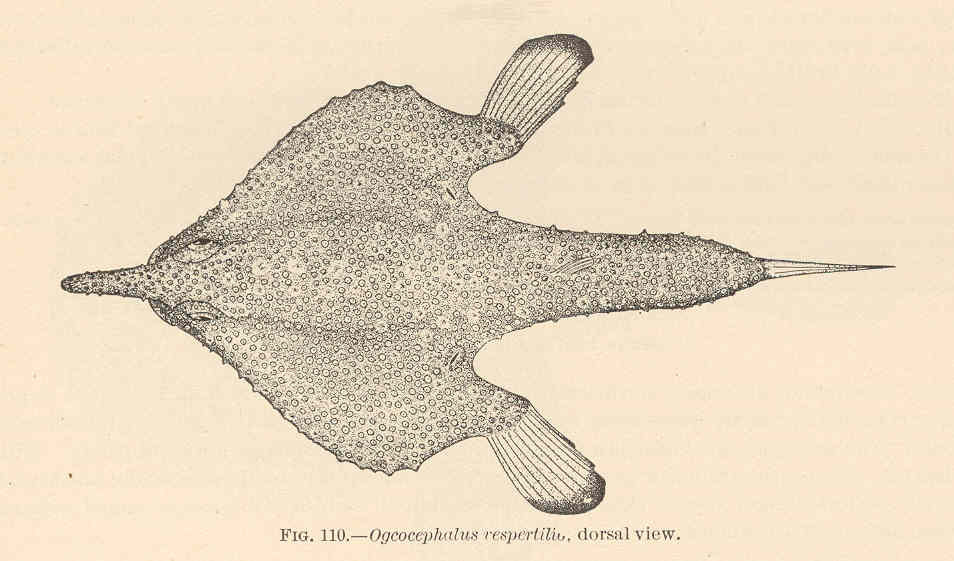
Dorsal view; Barton Warren Evermann and Millard Caleb Marsh

Ogcocephalus vespertilio has a very elongate rostrum which are also present in O. corniger and O. pumilus, but these species have lower pectoral fin ray counts. The flattened head and body of this fish, referred to as the "disc", is made up of the head and the body as far as the "axilla" of the pelvic fins; the forward edge of the disc is made up of the extended bones of the operculum sweeping backwards from the cranium and surrounding the trunk on either side. The horn-like rostrum on the snout varies from short to long and projects far beyond the eyes. The esca has 3 fleshy points and is kept on a small illivial cavity which is located under the rostrum. There is a spine at the angle of the operculum which is blunt or small, or to may be large but has no spinules. The gill rakers are oval-shaped plates with a covering of small "teeth". The eyes are on the sides of the head. The gill openings are small and are located to the rear of the upper bases of the pectoral fin. The pectoral and pelvic fins are resemble limbs and the pectoral fins are wholly separate from body. Thee small dorsal and anal fins are covered in skin and are located on the upper and lower surfaces of the tail. The dorsal surface of the body has scales that resemble large bucklers and conical spines. The ventral surface of the body is wholly covered in pointed, bony scales while the ventral surface of the tail has a dense covering of small spines, sometimes with a small number of conical spines along its midline. In preserved specimens the overall colour on the upper parts is brown marked with dark spots with pale lines between them. It has pale lips and a pale underside. The Brazilian seabat has a maximum published total length of 30.5 cm (12.0 in) and a maximum published weight of 60.8 g (2.14 oz).

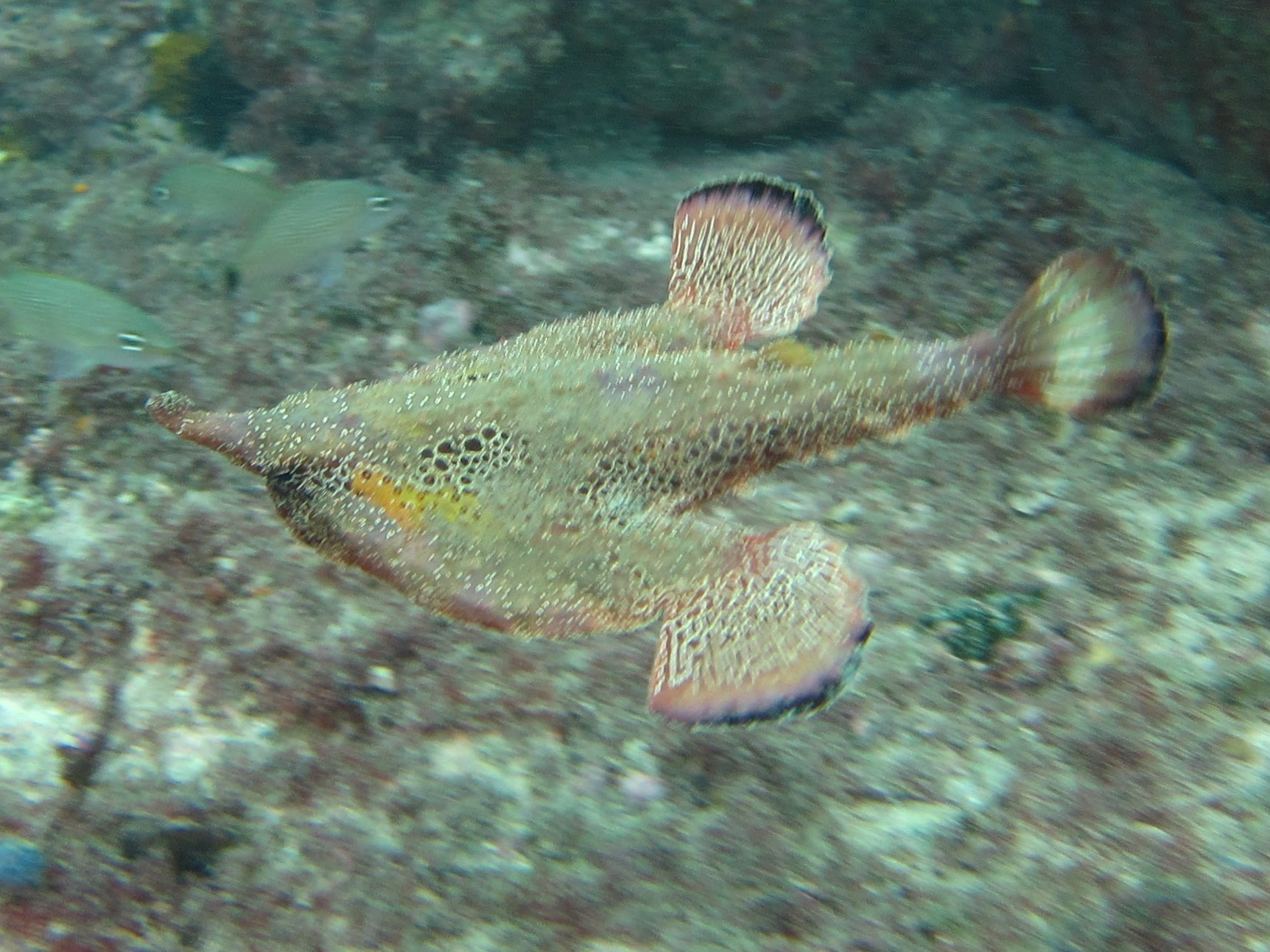
Swimming, in Brazil

== Distribution and habitat ==
Ogcocephalus vespertilio is found in the Western Atlantic Ocean along the coast of South America from Suriname in the north to Buenos Aires in the south. It occurs at depths between 24 and 66 m (79 and 217 ft) on soft substrates on the continental shelf, even entering the lower parts of estuaries. A specimen of this batfish was found in pure freshwater between 1,300 and 1,400 km (810 and 870 mi) upstream from the mouth of the Amazon.

== Biology ==
Ogcocephalus vespertilio is predatory, being a crepuscular/nocturnal hunter of benthic invertebrates. During the day it remains still and concealed in holes or crevices in rocks or among rocks on the seabed. It forages by walking over the bottom using its limb-like pelvic and pectoral fins, with its extended illicium "shivering", or being used to explore the bottom. The prey is then either snapped up by the mouth from the bottom, after visual detection, or excavated by the fish using its mouth and rostrum. The prey taken includes crustaceans, such as hermit crabs, crabs, shrimps, amphipods, porcelain crabs, isopods and mysid shrimps; molluscs such as sea snails, sea slugs and clams, as well as polychaetes and echinoderms (such as sea urchins and brittle stars).

== Utilisation ==
Ogcocephalus vespertilio is a common batfish in public aquaria, particularly in European aquaria. It is also used by indigenous peoples in the Amazon to treat asthma.
