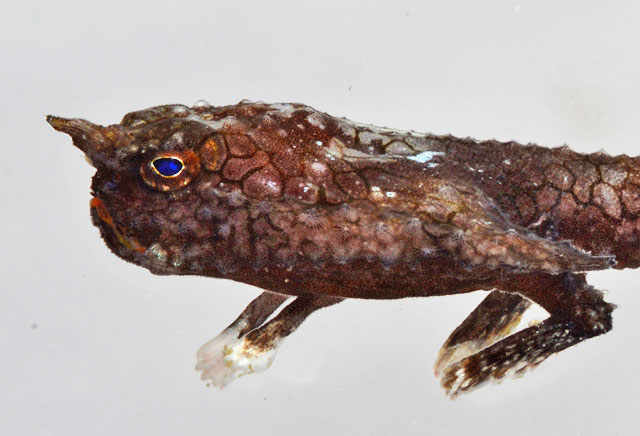

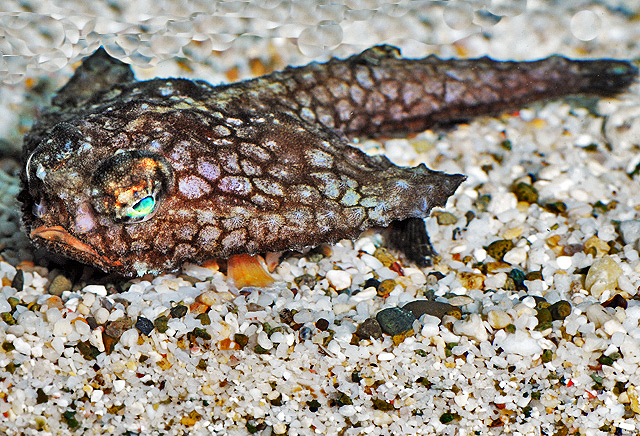
- Malthopsis gnoma

Scientific classification
- Kingdom: Animalia
- Phylum: Chordata
- Class: Actinopterygii
- Division: Teleostei
- Order: Lophiiformes
- Family: Ogcocephalidae
- Genus: Malthopsis; Alcock, 1891

Type species
- Malthopsis luteus Alcock, 1891

= Malthopsis =

Genus of fishes

Malthopsis, the gnome batfishes or triangular batfishes, is a genus of marine ray-finned fishes belonging to the family Ogcocephalidae, the deep sea batfishes. The triangular batfishes are distributed throughout the warmer waters of the world, although they are absent from the Eastern Atlantic Ocean. The genus was originally proposed in 1891 by the British naturalist Alfred W. Alcock.

== Taxonomy ==
Malthopsis was first proposed as a monospecific genus in 1891 by the British physician, carcinologist and naturalist Alfred William Alcock when he described Malthopsis luteus. Alcock gave the type locality of M. lutea as the Andaman Sea at 11°31'40"N, 92°46'06"E, Investigator station 115 from a depth between 188 and 220 fathoms (1,128 and 1,320 ft; 344 and 402 m). This genus is the most basal genus of the "Indo-Pacific clade" of the family Ogcocephalidae. The family Ogcocephalidae is classified in the monotypic suborder Ogcocephaloidei within the order Lophiiformes, the anglerfishes in the 5th edition of Fishes of the World.

== Species ==
There are currently 22 recognized species in this genus:

- Malthopsis annulifera Tanaka, 1908 (Ring triangular batfish)
- Malthopsis apis H.-C. Ho & Last, 2021 (Apine triangular batfish)
- Malthopsis arrietty H.-C. Ho, 2020 (Short-horn triangular batfish)
- Malthopsis asperata H.-C. Ho, Roberts & Shao, 2013 (Roughspine batfish)
- Malthopsis austrafricana H.-C. Ho, 2013 (Southern African triangular batfish)
- Malthopsis bradburyae H.-C. Ho, 2013 (Bradbury's triangular batfish)
- Malthopsis bulla H.-C. Ho & Last, 2021 (Flatscale triangular batfish)
- Malthopsis formosa H.-C. Ho & Koeda, 2019 (Taiwanese triangular batfish)
- Malthopsis gigas H.-C. Ho & Shao, 2010 (Giant triangular batfish)
- Malthopsis gnoma Bradbury, 1998 (Atlantic triangular batfish)
- Malthopsis jordani Gilbert, 1905 (Jordan's triangular batfish)
- Malthopsis kobayashii Tanaka, 1916 (Kobayashi's triangular batfish)
- Malthopsis lutea Alcock, 1891 (Yellow triangular batfish)
- Malthopsis mcgroutheri H.-C. Ho & Last, 2021 (McGrouther's triangular batfish)
- Malthopsis mitrigera Gilbert & Cramer, 1897 (Twospine triangular batfish)
- Malthopsis oculata H.-C. Ho & Last, 2021 (Bigeye triangular batfish)
- Malthopsis parva H.-C. Ho, Roberts & Shao, 2013 (Arrowhead triangular batfish)
- Malthopsis provocator Whitley, 1961 (Prickle triangular batfish)
- Malthopsis retifera H.-C. Ho, Prokofiev & Shao, 2009 (Reticulate triangular batfish)
- Malthopsis tetrabulla H.-C. Ho & Last, 2021 (Queensland triangular batfish)
- Malthopsis tiarella Jordan, 1902 (Spearnose seabat)
- Malthopsis velutina H.-C. Ho, 2020 (Polynesian triangular batfish)

== Etymology ==
Malthopsis combines opsis, meaning "resembles", with Malthe, a synonym of Ogcocephalus, although this genus has two gills on either side.

== Characteristics ==
Malthopsis batfishes have a flattened head, although this is higher than the body and they have a long tail. The body disc is very triangular in shape with a widely based rostrum which isclearly pointed and long and which overhangs the mouth. The esca is an oval bulb with 2 small cirri on its upper edge. The scales resemble bucklers or simple spines. The buckler-like scales on the subopercle are typically well-developed and have some enlarged spines. There are three squarish r obling patchjes of teeth on the vomer and palate and 2 closely set patches of teeth on the tongue. These fishes have small dorsal and anal fin which are located towards the rear of their bodies. The base of the pectoral fins have elbow-like joints and are clearly separated from body, while the pelvic fins are not reduced in size. All of the underside of body is covered in scales while the underside of the tail has a dense covering of small spines, as well as 2 rows of large conical scales. The lateral line is typically complete but when there is an interrupted lateral line the part nearer the tail takes a downward tutn immediately in front of the anus. The colour of the body is plain yellowish-brown to grey or dark brown and there are normally markings such as eyespots, plain spots, patches or reticulated lines. These fishes are small, the largest species in the genus is the giant triangular batfish (M. gigas) with a maximum published standard length of 13.6 cm (5.4 in) while the smallest is McCrouther's triangular batfish with a maximum published standard length of 4.5 cm (1.8 in).

== Distribution and habitat ==
Malthopsis batfishes are found in the Indian, Western Pacific and Western Atlantic Oceans, they are absent from the Eastern Pacific and Eastern Atlantic Oceans. They can be found from coastal regions down to depths of 1,000 m (3,300 ft).
