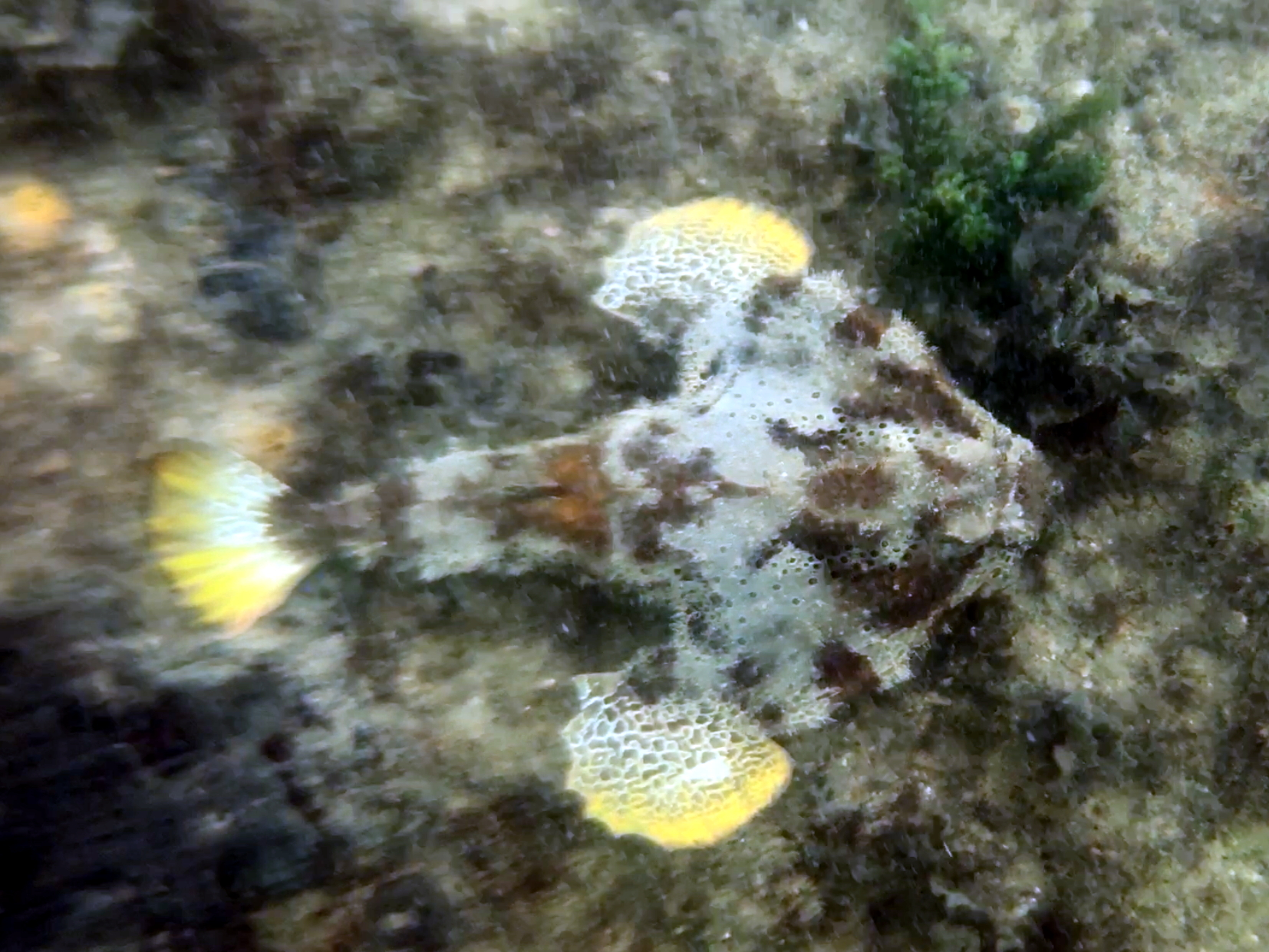

Scientific classification
- Kingdom: Animalia
- Phylum: Chordata
- Class: Actinopterygii
- Division: Teleostei
- Order: Lophiiformes
- Family: Ogcocephalidae
- Genus: Ogcocephalus
- Species: O. radiatus

Binomial name
- Ogcocephalus radiatus (Mitchill, 1818)

Synonyms
- Lophius radiatus Mitchill, 1818

= Ogcocephalus radiatus =

Species of fish

Ogcocephalus radiatus or the polka-dot batfish is an arrow-shaped fish in the family Ogcocephalidae with an elongated thin tail. It is dorso-ventrally flattened with round pectoral fins that sit flat on the bottom of the sea floor. It uses its pectoral fins and pelvic fins to "walk" along the bottom in a side-to-side shuffling motion.

== Description ==
The polka-dot batfish is a bottom-dwelling fish that can measure up to 380 mm (15 in) from head to tail. It is a broad, dorso-ventrally flattened, arrow-shaped fish, similar in appearance to a ray. The pelvic fins are located further forward than the broad pectoral fins, which flare out on both sides, supported by arm-like stalks. The polka-dot batfish looks similar to the short-nose batfish (Ogcocephalus nasutus), although the pectoral fins of the polka-dot batfish are speckled with small spots, whereas those of the short-nose are plain. The colouring of the polka-dot batfish is variable; it is usually brown with darker spots, some rimmed with white, and scattered patches of reddish or orangish-brown. This colouration provides camouflage as the fish lies on the seabed waiting for prey. The top of the head and body are covered in tubercles, giving it a rough texture and warty appearance; it does not have scales. The polka-dot batfish has an elongated rostrum (a unicorn-like projection between the eyes) on its large, bony head. The dorsal fin has become modified to a single spine located under the rostrum.

== Distribution ==
The polka-dot batfish is native to the Atlantic coast of the United States with its range extending from North Carolina to Florida, the Bahamas and the Campeche Bank off the coast of Mexico. They have been found in waters up to 70 m (230 ft) deep, but most are found at shallower depths. It is a benthic (bottom dweller) fish, usually found on sandy or muddy seabeds, coral rubble or seagrass meadows.

== Behaviour ==
The polka-dot batfish preys on juvenile fish, crabs, shrimps, molluscs, and worms. It hunts by clinging to the bottom with its pectoral fins and wiggling the moveable, modified dorsal fin beneath its rostrum to attract prey. The rostrum also contains a chemical that helps attract the prey. When the prey is sufficiently close, it snatches the victim with its circular mouth. They sit and wait for their prey to come to them instead of chasing after their prey. They are very stealthy and stalk their prey before attacking. If approached by predators, the batfish bury themselves in the sand with their pectoral fins or scurry across the ocean bottom like a crab.
