= O. darwini =

B. darwini may refer to:

- Ogcocephalus darwini, Red-lipped batfish
- Oxycantha darwini

== See also ==
- Darwini (disambiguation)
