= Malthopsis bradburyae =

Conservation status
- Data Deficient (IUCN 3.1)

Scientific classification
- Kingdom: Animalia
- Phylum: Chordata
- Class: Actinopterygii
- Order: Lophiiformes
- Family: Ogcocephalidae
- Genus: Malthopsis
- Species: M. bradburyae

Binomial name
- Malthopsis bradburyae H.-C. Ho, 2013

Species of fish

Malthopsis bradburyae, Bradbury's triangular batfish, is a species of marine ray-finned fish belonging to the family Ogcocephalidae, the deep-sea batfishes. This little known species is found in the western Indian Ocean off Tanzania and is named in honour of the American ichthyologist Margaret G. Bradbury.

== Taxonomy ==
Malthopsis bradburyae was first formally described in 2013 by the Taiwanese ichthyologist Hans, Hsuan-Ching Ho with its type biology given as the western Indian Ocean off Tanzania at 22°06'51"S, 39°54'E, from a depth of 100 m (330 ft). This species is a member of the M. annulifera species complex. The genus Malthopsis is the most basal genus of the "Indo-Pacific clade" of the family Ogcocephalidae. The family Ogcocephalidae is classified in the monotypic suborder Ogcocephaloidei within the order Lophiiformes, the anglerfishes in the 5th edition of Fishes of the World.

== Etymology ==
Malthopsis bradburyae has the genus name Malthopsis which suffixes opsis, meaning "resembles", onto Malthe, a synonym of Ogcocephalus, although this genus has two gills on either side. The specific name, bradburyae, honours the American ichthyologist Margaret G. Bradbury of San Francisco State University, in recognition of her contribution to the study of Ogcocephalid batfishes, and for her friendship with Ho.

== Description ==
Malthopsis bradburyae has the dorsal fin supported by 5 or 6 soft rays while the anal fin is supported by 3 or 4 soft rays. The body is a flattened disc with the head higher than the disc. The rostrum is relatively long and pointed, pointing forward and not upwards. The eyes are small with a wide space between them with a deep groove. The upper surface is covered in scales that resemble bucklers and many spines. The lower body's surface is densely covered in small spines and small buckler-like scales. The scales on the breast are quite large. The buckler on the subopercle is blunt with no strong spines. The anal fin almost extends as far as the caudal fin when fully lowered. The colour of the preserved specimens is a plain creamy yellowish with some thin reticulated lines on the shoulder. This species attains a maximum published standard length of 7.2 cm (2.8 in),

== Distribution and habitat ==
Malthopsis bradburyae is known from eight specimens collected in the Western Indian Ocean off the coast of Tanzania from the upper Continental shelf at a depth of around 100 m (330 ft).
