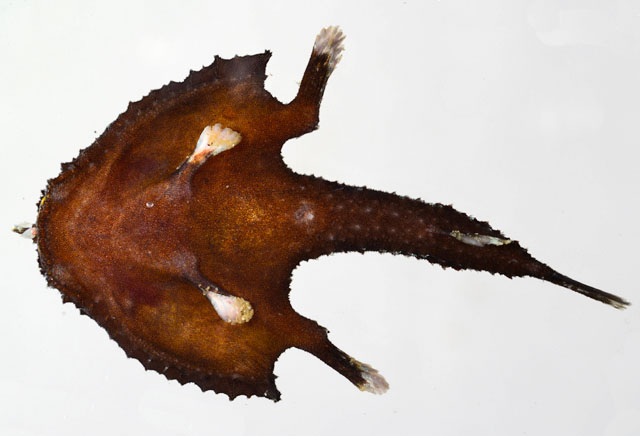

Conservation status
- Least Concern (IUCN 3.1)

Scientific classification
- Kingdom: Animalia
- Phylum: Chordata
- Class: Actinopterygii
- Order: Lophiiformes
- Family: Ogcocephalidae
- Genus: Malthopsis
- Species: M. gnoma

Binomial name
- Malthopsis gnoma Bradbury, 1998
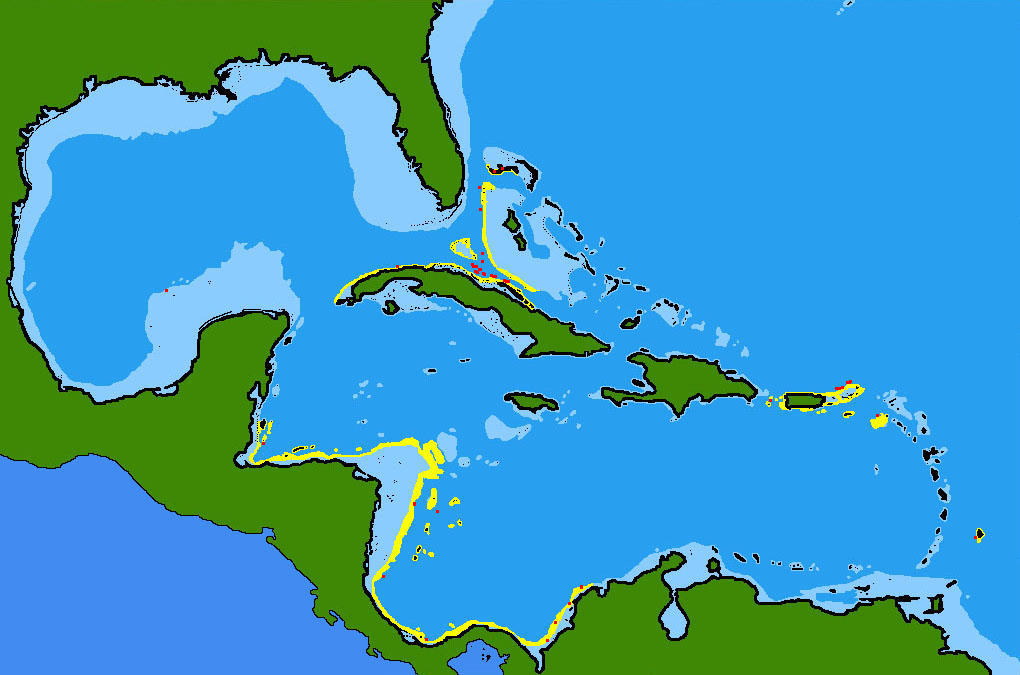

= Malthopsis gnoma =

Species of fish

Malthopsis gnoma, the Atlantic triangular batfish, gnome seabat or grotesque seabat, is a species of marine ray-finned fish belonging to the family Ogcocephalidae, the deep-sea batfishes. The grotesque seabat is found in the Western Atlantic Ocean, in the Gulf of Mexico and Caribbean.

== Taxonomy ==
Malthopsis gnoma was first formally described in 1998 by the American ichthyologist Margaret G. Bradbury with its type locality given as off the northern coast of Cuba at 22°44'N, 78°41'W from a depth between 274 and 329 m (899 and 1,079 ft). This species is a member of the genus Malthopsis, the most basal genus in the "Indo-Pacific" clade in the family Ogcocephalidae. The family Ogcocephalidae is classified in the monotypic suborder Ogcocephaloidei within the order Lophiiformes, the anglerfishes in the 5th edition of Fishes of the World.

== Etymology ==
Malthopsis gnoma has the genus name Malthopsis which suffixes opsis, meaning "resembles", onto Malthe, a synonym of Ogcocephalus, although this genus has two gills on either side. The specific name, gnoma, means "gnome-like", an allusion to its small size and rather grotesque appearance.

== Description ==
Mathopsis gnoma has a flattened head which is higher than the rest of the body disc, which is triangular in shape. It has a long tail. The mouth is small and the illicial cavity is also small. The esca is a bulb with no other lobes. Overhanging the mouth is the small, obviously upturned, cone-shaped rostrum. The eyes are not protected by a transparent cover. The scales at the angle of the operculum resemble bucklers and have a well-developed backwards directed spine at their ends. The small gill opening are situated to the rear of the upper base of the pectoral fin, which are clearly separate from the body. The small dorsal and anal fins are located towards the rear of the body disc, the pelvic fins are not reduced. The scales on the body take the form of bucklers and spines with the lower body being densely covered in scales and the lower side of the tail being densely covered in spines apart from 2 scale rows of large conical scales. The small mouth is terminal and has simple teeth on the jaws, tongue, palate and vomer. The dorsal fin is supported by 4 or 5 soft rays. This species has a maximum published standard length of 6.1 cm (2.4 in). There are dark reticulated lines on the body and tail with a dark stripe through the middle of the dorsal fin.

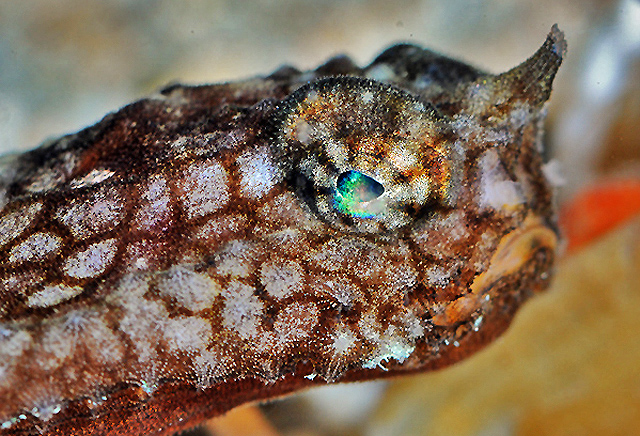

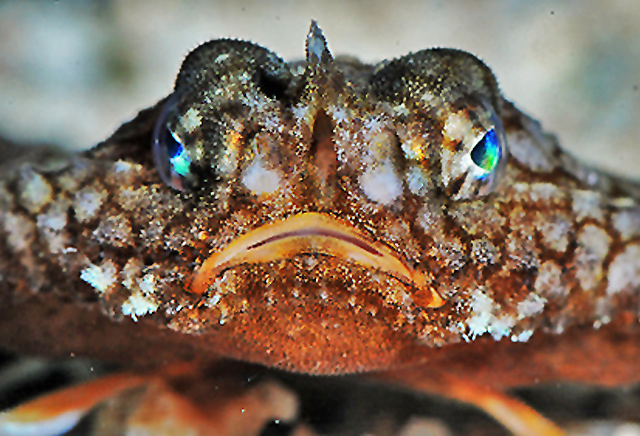

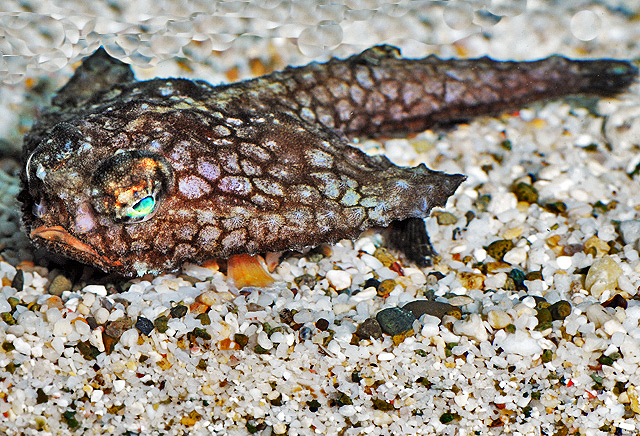

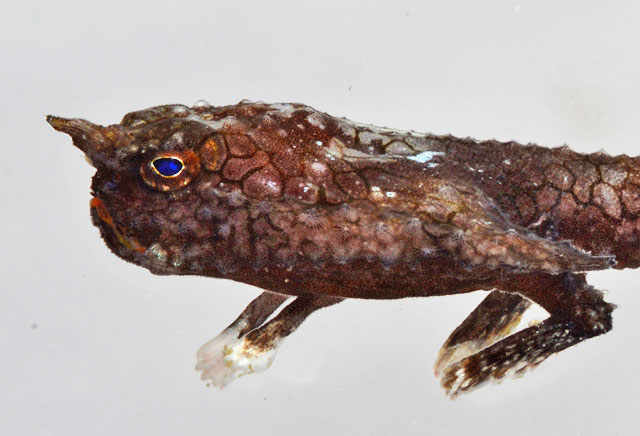

== Distribution and habitat ==
Malthopsis gnoma is found in the western Atlantic Ocean where it has been recorded from the Bahamas, the Campeche Bank to northwestern Cuba in the southern Gulf of Mexico, in the Caribbean Sea from Cuba through both the Greater and Lesser Antilles as far as Barbados. It also occurs along the eastern coast of Central America from Quintana Roo, Mexico to Curaçao. This is a bathydemersal fish which is found on the upper continental slope on soft substrates at depths between 91 and 475 m (299 and 1,558 ft), typically 275 to 475 m (902 to 1,558 ft).

== Biology ==
Malthopsis gnoma is a carnivorous species feeding on crustaceans, molluscs and worms. The eggs and larvae are pelagic.
