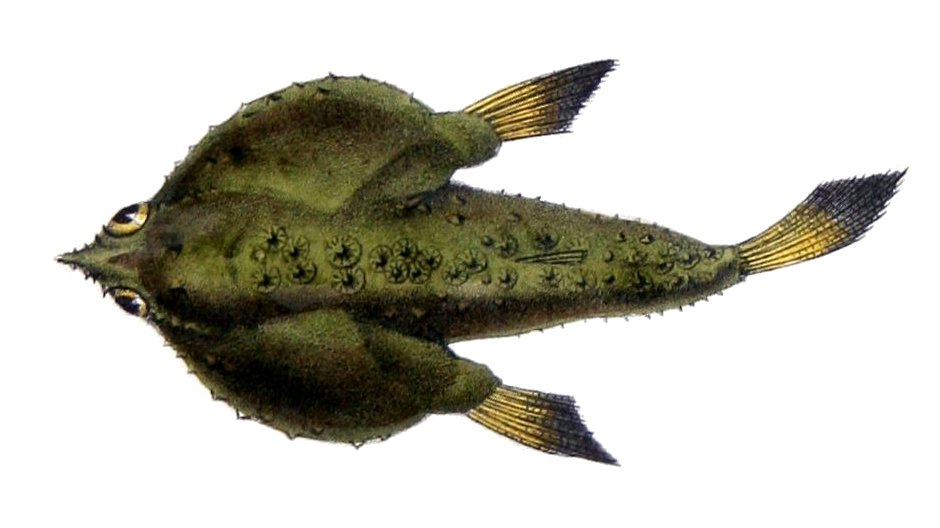

Conservation status
- Least Concern (IUCN 3.1)

Scientific classification
- Kingdom: Animalia
- Phylum: Chordata
- Class: Actinopterygii
- Order: Lophiiformes
- Family: Ogcocephalidae
- Genus: Ogcocephalus
- Species: O. notatus

Binomial name
- Ogcocephalus notatus (Valenciennes, 1837)

Synonyms
- Malthaea notata Valenciennes, 1837; Malthe angusta Cuvier, 1829; Malthe notata Cuvier, 1829; Malthaea truncata Valenciennes, 1837; Ogcocephalus nasutus cayennensis Puyo, 1936

= Ogcocephalus notatus =

Species of fish

Ogcocephalus notatus, the marked batfish, is a species of ray-finned fish belonging to the family Ogcocephalidae, the deep sea batfishes. It is found in the tropical western Atlantic Ocean.

== Taxonomy ==
Ogcocephalus notatus was first formally described as Malthea notata in 1837 by the French zoologist Achille Valenciennes with its type locality given as Suriname. The genus Ogcocephalus is classified within the "Eastern Pacific/Western Atlantic clade" of the family Ogcocephalidae. The family Ogcocephalidae is classified in the monotypic suborder Ogcocephaloidei within the order Lophiiformes, the anglerfishes in the 5th edition of Fishes of the World.

== Etymology ==
Ogcocephalus notatus is a member of the genus Ogcocephalus, the name of which is a combination of ogkos, which means "hook", and cephalus, meaning "head", an allusion to the pointed rostrum on the snout of the type species. The specific name notatus, means "marked", Valenciennes described this species as having 3 or 4 small, round, black spots, located on either side of the opercular spine.

== Description ==
Ogcocephalus notatus has a flattened head, although this is higher than the rest of the triangular disk, with a pointed snout. The rostrum is shelf-like and rather blunt. The esca, or lure, has 3 fleshy points which is retracted into the illicial cavity under the rostrum. There is a blunt, poorly developed, simple spine on the lower, posterior angle of the operculum. The gill rakers are oval shaped plates which are covered in small teeth and the gill openings are small, opening behind the upper base of the pectoral fin, this fin and the pelvic fin's are limb-like with the pectoral fins not widely attached to the body. The dorsal and anal fins are small, the dorsal fin is covered in skin and is on the tail while the anal fin is fleshy and under the tail. The upper surface of the body is covered in large buckler-like scales and with conical spines, the lower surface of the body has a complete covering of pointed, bony scales and the underside of the tail has a dense covering of small spines, apart from a few conical spines on its midline. The upper body is grayish-brown with pale tips to the buckler-like scales. There are between 1 and 7 pale margined dark spots along the edge of the disc and there are sometimes dark spots on the upper body and the sides of the tail. This species has an oval-shaped pupil rather than the kidney-shaped or dumbbell shaped pupils of other Ogcocephalus batfishes. The marked batfish has a maximum published total length of 13.4 cm (5.3 in).

== Distribution and habitat ==
Ogcocephalus notatus is found in the central western Atlantic Ocean along the northern coast of South America from Colombia east to Aracaju in Brazil. It is also found around Bonaire, Sint Eustatius, Saba and Trinidad and Tobago. This demersal fish is found at depths between 15 and 172 m (49 and 564 ft) on soft bottoms, also in estuaries.

== Biology ==
Ogcocephalus notatus is likely to have a similar biology to its congeners, feeding on a variety of benthic invertebrates and some fishes. Seep-sea batfishes have pelagiceggs and larvae, the larvae ememorphosing into juveniles when they settle on the substrate.
