= Ogcocephalus rostellum =

Conservation status
- Least Concern (IUCN 3.1)

Scientific classification
- Kingdom: Animalia
- Phylum: Chordata
- Class: Actinopterygii
- Division: Teleostei
- Order: Lophiiformes
- Family: Ogcocephalidae
- Genus: Ogcocephalus
- Species: O. rostellum

Binomial name
- Ogcocephalus rostellum Bradbury, 1980

Species of fish

Ogcocephalus rostellum, the palefin batfish, is a species of ray-finned fish belonging to the family Ogcocephalidae, the deep sea batfishes. It is found in the western Atlantic Ocean.

== Taxonomy ==
Ogcocephalus rostellum was first formally described in 1980 by the American ichthyologist Margaret G. Bradbury with its type locality given as Atlantic coast of Florida at 29°10'N, 80°19'W, Combat station 336, from a depth of 25 fathoms (150 ft; 46 m). The genus Ogcocephalus is classified within the "Eastern Pacific/Western Atlantic clade" of the family Ogcocephalidae. The family Ogcocephalidae is classified in the monotypic suborder Ogcocephaloidei within the order Lophiiformes, the anglerfishes in the 5th edition of Fishes of the World.

== Etymology ==
Ogcocephalus rostellum is a member of the genus Ogcocephalus, the name of which is a combination of ogkos, which means "hook", and cephalus, meaning "head", an allusion to the pointed rostrum on the snout of the type species. The specific name rostellum, is the diminutive of rostrum, an allusion to the small snout described for this species.

== Description ==
Ogcocephalus rostellum has a low, flattened head and a triangular disc, with a pointed snout and a rather short rostrum, small and conical in juveniles and shelf-like in larger specimens. The esca has 3 fleshy points and it is retracted into a small illicial cavity beneath the rostrum. The eyes are on the sides of the head and it has a relatively small mouth. There is a blunt, poorly developed, simple spine on the lower, posterior angle of the operculum. The gill rakers are oval shaped plates which are covered in small teeth and the gill openings are small, opening behind the upper base of the pectoral fin, this fin and the pelvic fin's are limb-like with the pectoral fins not widely attached to the body. The dorsal and anal fins are small, the dorsal fin is covered in skin and is on the tail while the anal fin is fleshy and under the tail. he upper surface of the body is covered in large buckler-like scales and with conical spines, the lower surface of the body has a complete covering of pointed, bony scales and the underside of the tail has a dense covering of small spines, apart from a few conical spines on its midline. The upper body is brown, broken by white blotches with dark mottles on the axilla of the pectoral fin. Thin black lines radiate from the midpoints of the buckler-like scales. There is an elongated cluster < of circular dark spots in each shoulder, with a small number of bright orange spots intermingled with them. The caudal fin and pectoral fin both have brow, mottled bases with yellow middles and vermilion edges with a thin black outer margin. The mouth is intensely red and the iris is brassy pink with a ring of tan spots. The palefin batfish has a maximum published total length of 19 cm (7.5 in).

== Distribution and habitat ==
Ogcocephalus rostellum is found in the Western Atlantic Ocean where it is found from North Carolina, south along the southeastern coast of the United States to the Bahamas and into the Gulf of Mexico from the Florida Keys north to the Florida Middle Grounds. The palefin batfish is a demersal fish found at depths between 13 and 378 m (43 and 1,240 ft) on soft substrates.
