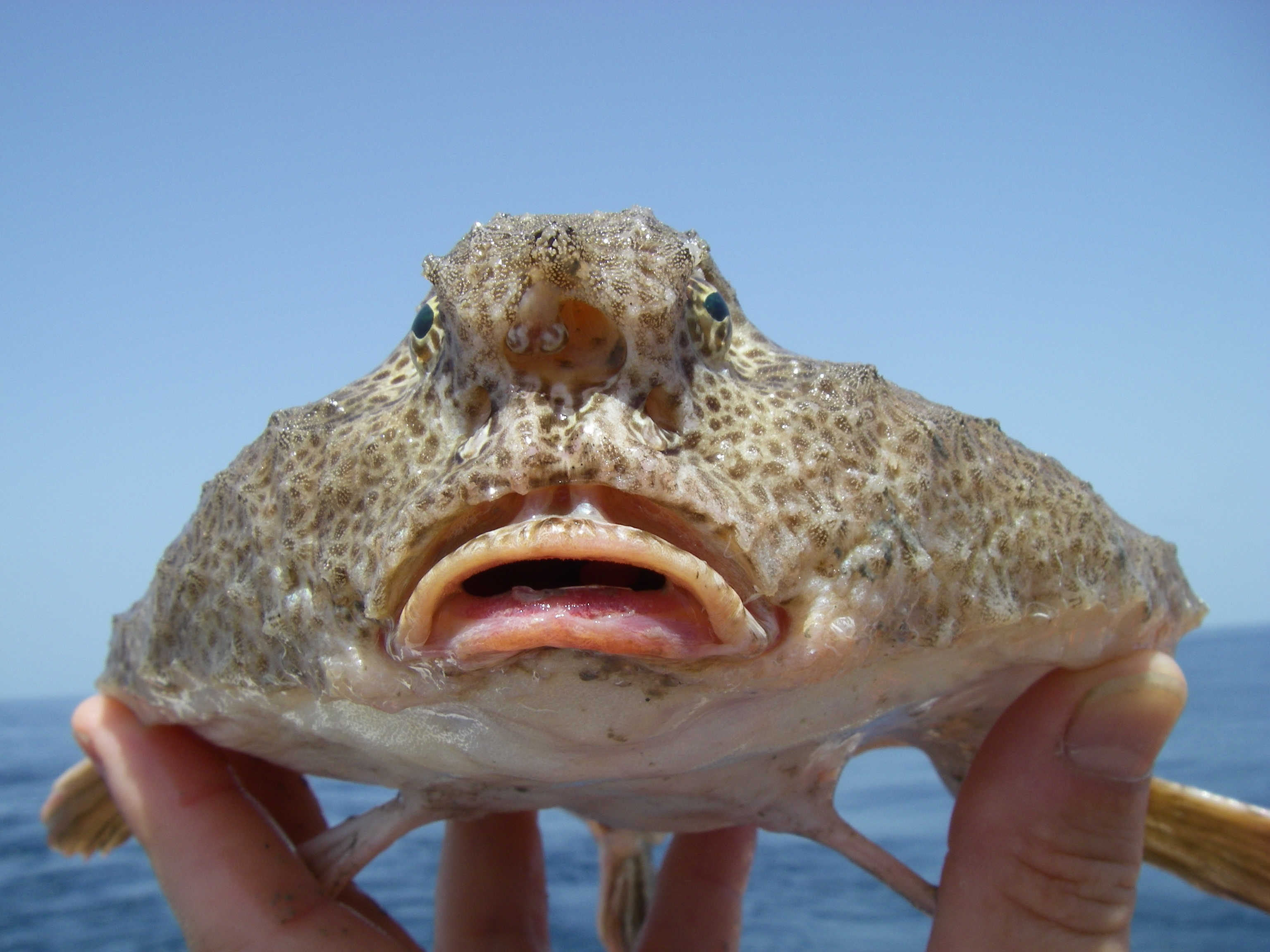

Conservation status
- Least Concern (IUCN 3.1)

Scientific classification
- Kingdom: Animalia
- Phylum: Chordata
- Class: Actinopterygii
- Order: Lophiiformes
- Family: Ogcocephalidae
- Genus: Ogcocephalus
- Species: O. declivirostris

Binomial name
- Ogcocephalus declivirostris Bradbury, 1980

= Ogcocephalus declivirostris =

Species of fish

Ogcocephalus declivirostris, the slantbrow batfish, is a species of ray-finned fish belonging to the family Ogcocephalidae, the deep sea batfishes. This species is found in the western Atlantic Ocean from the northern Gulf of Mexico to the Straits of Florida.

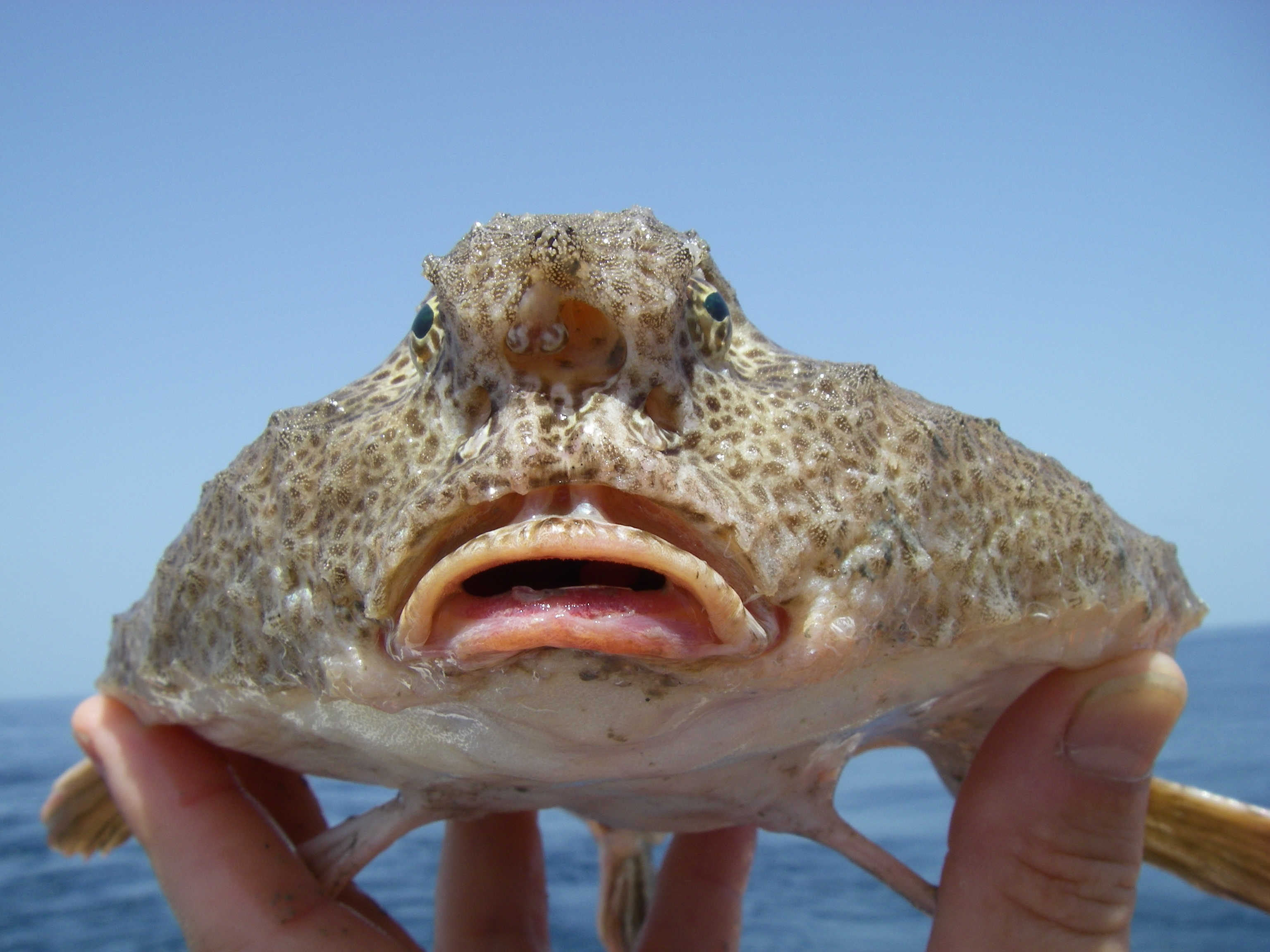
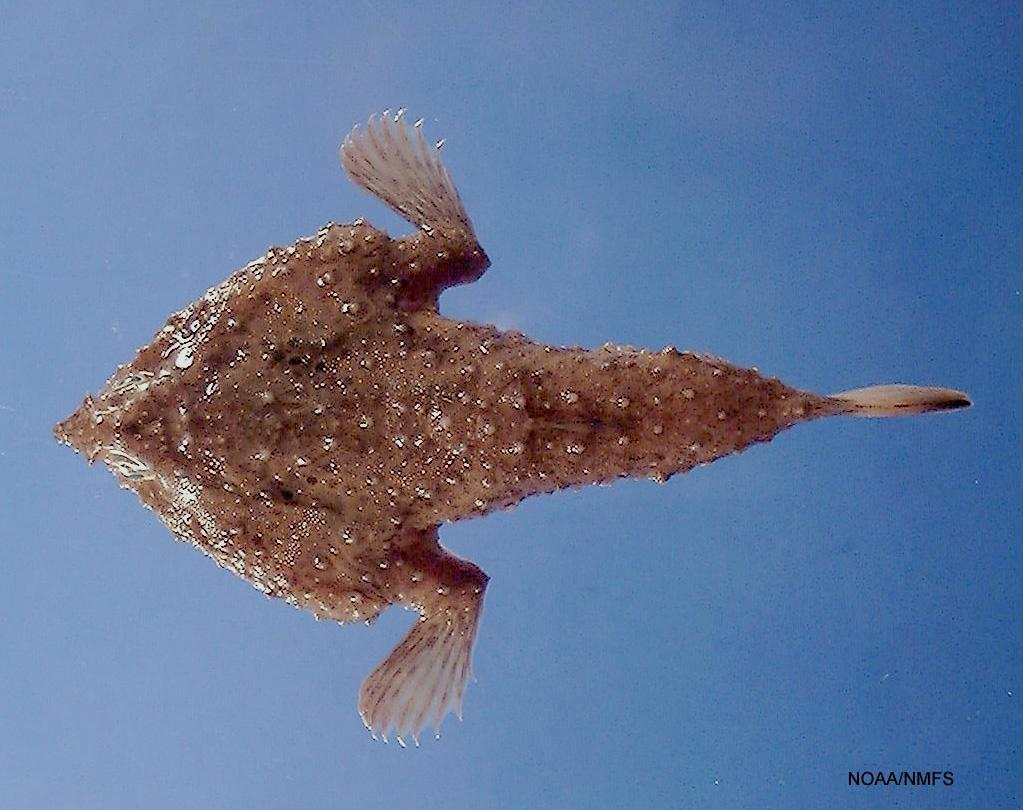
Slantbrow batfish (Ogcocephalus declivirostris)

== Taxonomy ==
Ogcocephalus declivirostris was first formally described in 1980 by the American ichthyologist Margaret G. Bradbury with its type locality given as off Texas at 28°02'N, 96°03'W from a depth of 40 m (130 ft). The genus Ogcocephalus is classified within the "Eastern Pacific/Western Atlantic clade" of the family Ogcocephalidae. The family Ogcocephalidae is classified in the monotypic suborder Ogcocephaloidei within the order Lophiiformes, the anglerfishes in the 5th edition of Fishes of the World.

== Etymology ==
Ogcocephalus declivirostris is a member of the genus Ogcocephalus, the name of which is a combination of ogkos, which means "hook", and cephalus, meaning "head", an allusion to the pointed rostrum on the snout of the type species. The specific name declivirostris, compounds declivis, which means "sloping", with rostris, meaning "snout", an allusion to the downwards pointing snout of this species.

== Description ==
Ogcocephalus declivirostris has a flattened head, although this is higher than the rest of the triangular disk, with a pointed snout. The short rostrum has the form of a thin based rod and is horizontal or points downwards. The esca, or lure, has 3 fleshy points which is retracted into the illicial cavity under the rostrum. There is a blunt, poorly developed, simple spine on the lower, posterior angle of the operculum. The gill rakers are oval shaped plates which are covered in small teeth and the gill openings are small, opening behind the upper base of the pectoral fin, this fin and the pelvic fin's are limb-like with the pectoral fins not widely attached to the body. The dorsal and anal fins are small, the dorsal fin is covered in skin and is on the tail while the anal fin is fleshy and under the tail. The upper surface of the body is covered in large buckler-like scales and with conical spines, the lower surface of the body has a complete covering of pointed, bony scales and the underside of the tail has a dense covering of small spines, apart from a few conical spines on its midline. The upper body is plain gray brown with paler tips to the bucklers, it sometimes has clusters of brown spots on the face and the shoulders, at the axils of the pectoral fins and on the tail. The juveniles have a black tip to the rostrum, clear spots on the face and shoulders, they sometimes have dark tips to the pectoral fins and a dusky dorsal fin with indistinct darker blotches. The slantbrow batfish has a maximum published total length of 16.5 cm (6.5 in).

== Distribution and habitat ==
Ogcocephalus declivirostris is endemic to the Gulf of Mexico where it occurs from Pensacola, Florida to the Tabasco coast in Mexico. It has also been recorded from near Cayo Arenas on the Campeche Bank with unconfirmed reports from Nicaragua, Panama and Venezuela. The slantbrow batfish is found on soft substrates at depths between 3.5 and 388 m (11 and 1,273 ft).

== Biology ==
Ogcocephalus declivirostris is a demersal fish that preys on a variety of benthic invertebrates, especially gastropods, polychaetes, and xanthid crabs. The eggs and larvae are pelagic.
