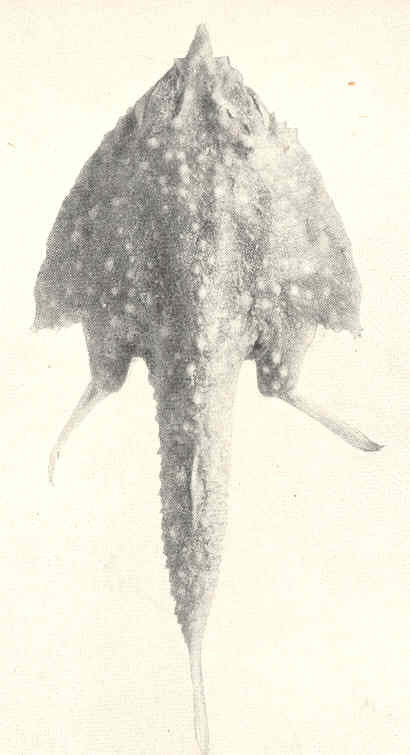

Conservation status
- Least Concern (IUCN 3.1)

Scientific classification
- Kingdom: Animalia
- Phylum: Chordata
- Class: Actinopterygii
- Order: Lophiiformes
- Family: Ogcocephalidae
- Genus: Malthopsis
- Species: M. lutea

Binomial name
- Malthopsis lutea Alcock, 1891

= Malthopsis lutea =

Species of fish

Malthopsis lutea, the yellow triangular batfish or longnose seabat, is a species of marine ray-finned fish belonging to the family Ogcocephalidae, the deep-sea batfishes. This species is found in the Indian Ocean. The longnose seabat is the type species of the genus Malthopsis.
