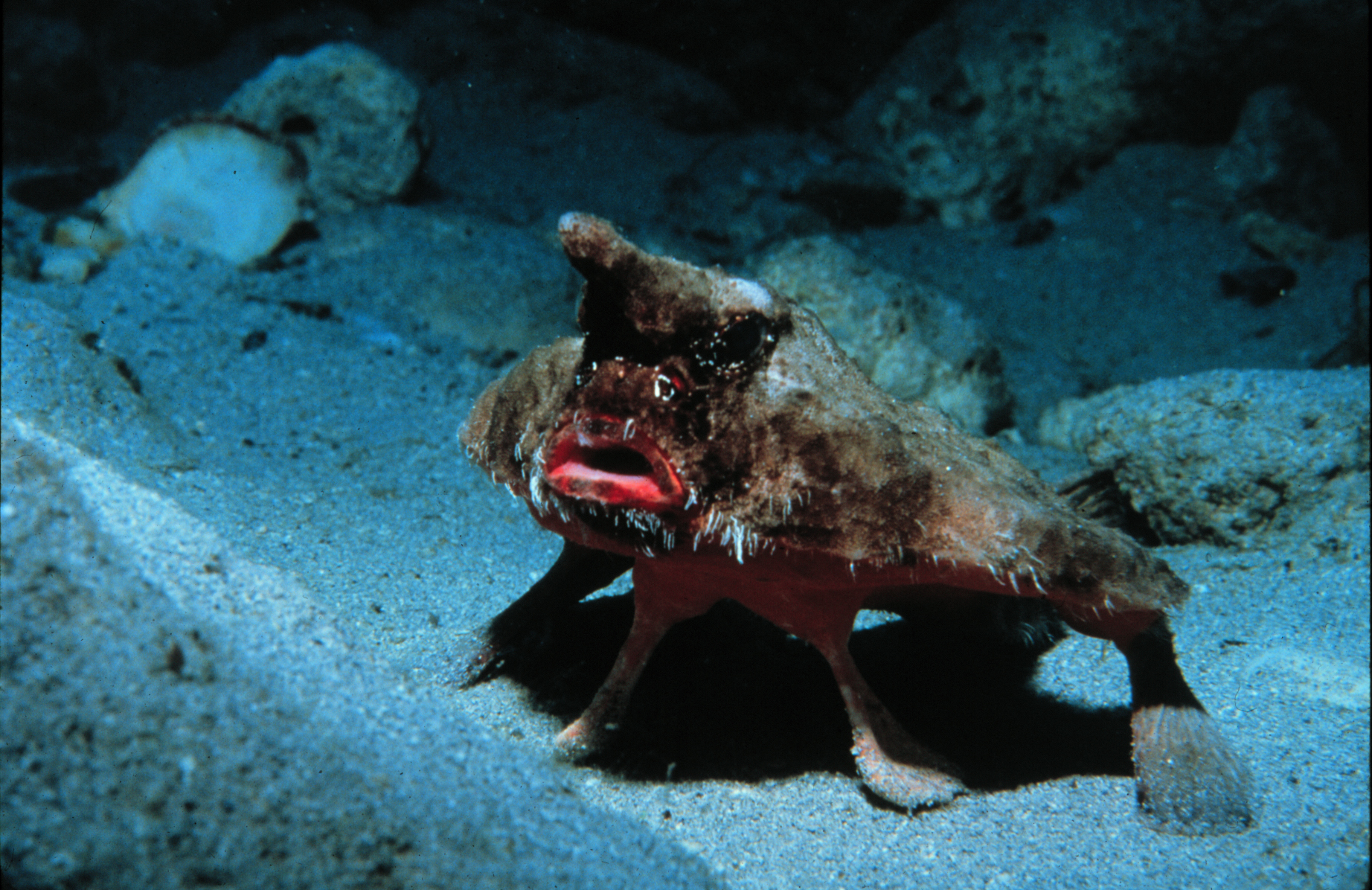

Conservation status
- Least Concern (IUCN 3.1)

Scientific classification
- Kingdom: Animalia
- Phylum: Chordata
- Class: Actinopterygii
- Order: Lophiiformes
- Family: Ogcocephalidae
- Genus: Ogcocephalus
- Species: O. parvus

Binomial name
- Ogcocephalus parvus Longley & Hildebrand, 1940

= Ogcocephalus parvus =

Species of fish

Ogcocephalus parvus, the roughback batfish, is a species of marine ray-finned fish belonging to the family Ogcocephalidae, the batfishes. This species has a wide distribution in the Western Atlantic Ocean.

== Taxonomy ==
Ogcocephalus parvus was first formally described in 1940 by the American biologists William Harding Longley and Samuel Frederick Hildebrand with its type locality given as Tortugas, Florida from a depth between 40 and 60 fathoms (240 and 360 ft; 73 and 110 m). The genus Ogcocephalus is classified within the "Eastern Pacific/Western Atlantic clade" of the family Ogcocephalidae. The family Ogcocephalidae is classified in the monotypic suborder Ogcocephaloidei within the order Lophiiformes, the anglerfishes in the 5th edition of Fishes of the World.

== Etymology ==
Ogcocephalus parvus is a member of the genus Ogcocephalus, the name of which is a combination of ogkos, which means "hook", and cephalus, meaning "head", an allusion to the pointed rostrum on the snout of the type species. The specific name parvus, means small.

== Description ==
Ogcocephalus parvus has a relatively high head, a triangular disc and a pointed snout. The rostrum varies from a finger shape to a small cone and is directed upwards. The esca has 3 fleshy points and it is retracted into a small illicial cavity beneath the rostrum. The eyes are on the sides of the head and it has a relatively small mouth, its width being less than half the width of the head. There is a blunt, poorly developed, simple spine on the lower, posterior angle of the operculum. The gill rakers are oval shaped plates which are covered in small teeth and the gill openings are small, opening behind the upper base of the pectoral fin, this fin and the pelvic fin's are limb-like with the pectoral fins not widely attached to the body. The dorsal and anal fins are small, the dorsal fin is covered in skin and is on the tail while the anal fin is fleshy and under the tail. he upper surface of the body is covered in large buckler-like scales and with conical spines, the lower surface of the body has a complete covering of pointed, bony scales and the underside of the tail has a dense covering of small spines, apart from a few conical spines on its midline. The colour of the roughback batfish varies geographically: in the Gulf of Mexico they are dark brown on the upper body; off the Atlantic Coast of the United States it is bright tan and off Guyana it is very dark. The pattern of spots also varies geographically as do the colours and patterns of the underside, fins and lips. The roughback batfish has a maximum published total length of 10 cm (3.9 in).

== Distribution and habitat ==
Ogcocephlaus parvus has a wide distribution in the Western Atlantic Ocean from North Carolina in the north south to the Bahamas, all through the Gulf of Mexico apart from Cuba, and the Caribbean Sea where it has been recorded from Jamaica and Puerto Rico. It also occurs along the coast of Central and South America from Quintana Roo in Mexico to Suriname. It is found at depths between29 and 126 m (95 and 413 ft), typically at depths shallower than 54 m (177 ft). It is found on soft substrates.

== Biology ==
Ogcocephlaus parvus has a poorly understood biology, batfishes are predatory feeding on small snails, clams, crustaceans, and scallops, as well as worms and occasionally small fishes. The eggs and larvae of batfishes are pelagic and undergo metamorphosis when they settle on the substrate.
