= Red-lipped batfish =

- Off the Galápagos Islands

Conservation status
- Least Concern (IUCN 3.1)

Scientific classification
- Kingdom: Animalia
- Phylum: Chordata
- Class: Actinopterygii
- Division: Teleostei
- Order: Lophiiformes
- Family: Ogcocephalidae
- Genus: Ogcocephalus
- Species: O. darwini

Binomial name
- Ogcocephalus darwini C. L. Hubbs, 1958

Species of anglerfish

The red-lipped batfish or Galápagos batfish (Ogcocephalus darwini) is a fish of unusual morphology found around the Galápagos Islands, Ecuador at depths of 3 to 76 m (10 to 249 ft). The red-lipped batfish is mainly known for its bright red lips. Batfish are not good swimmers; they use their highly adapted pectoral, pelvic and anal fins to "walk" on the ocean floor. When the batfish reaches maturity, its dorsal fin becomes a single spine-like projection (thought to function primarily as a lure for prey).

== Taxonomy ==
The red-lipped batfish was first formally described in 1958 by the American ichthyologist Carl Leavitt Hubbs, with its type locality given as Tagus Cove on Isabela Island. The genus Ogcocephalus is classified within the "Eastern Pacific/Western Atlantic clade" of the family Ogcocephalidae. The family Ogcocephalidae is classified in the monotypic suborder Ogcocephaloidei within the order Lophiiformes (the anglerfishes) in the 5th edition of Fishes of the World (Nelson, Grande, Wilson, 2016).

== Etymology ==
The red-lipped batfish is a member of the genus Ogcocephalus (from Greek roots ogkos, "hook", and cephalus, "head"), an allusion to the pointed rostrum on the snout of the type species. The specific name refers to Charles Darwin, to mark the centenary of the publication of On the Origin of Species and to recognise the importance that the observations made on the Galápagos Islands had in developing the theory of island endemism.

== Description ==
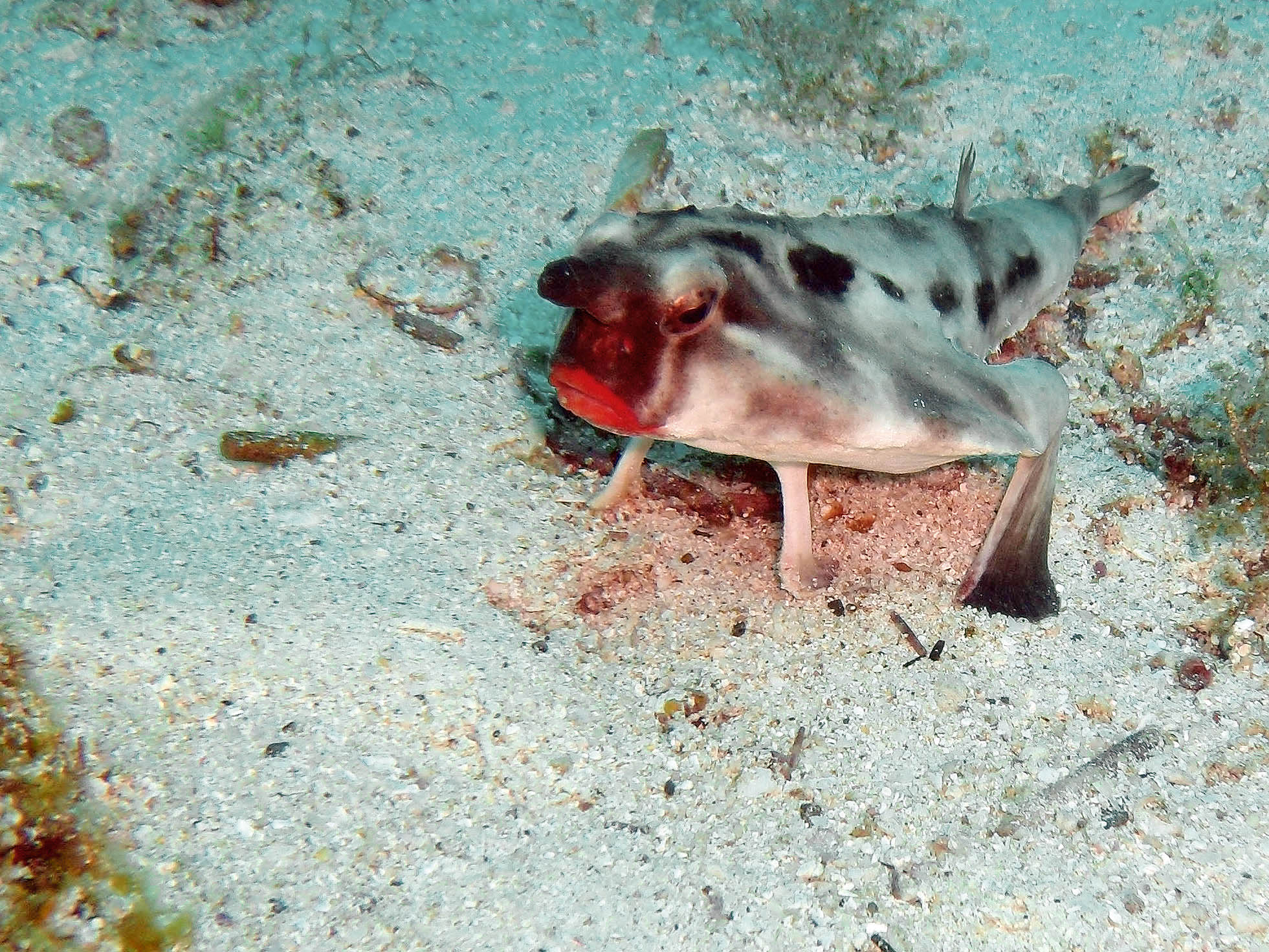
In the Galapagos

Front view

Dorsal view

The red-lipped batfish reaches up to 40 centimetres (16 in) in length. Its body color is light brown and greyish on its back (though not very visible in sea), with white countershading on the underside. A dark brown stripe run on its back, from the head to the back to the tail. The snout and horn of the red-lipped batfish are brown. The color of the squamation of the red-lipped batfish is shagreen-like with a relatively smooth texture. The bucklers are concealed by a layer of fine spinules.

As the vernacular name suggests, the batfish has bright, almost fluorescent, red lips, which allow to distinguish them from other batfish species. Marine biologists hypothesize that the lip coloration may enhance species recognition during spawning.

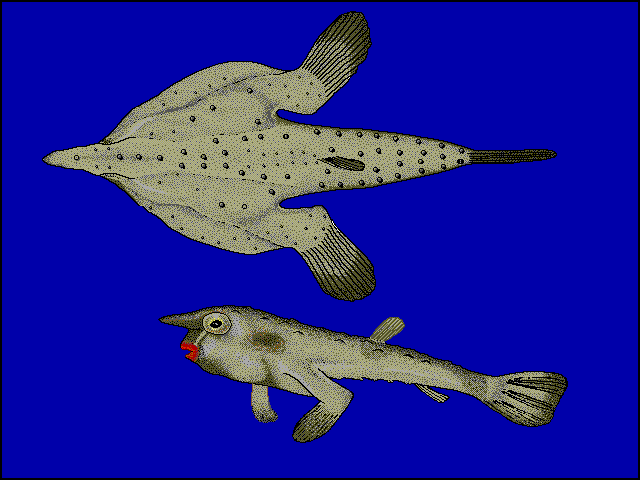
Ogcocephalus darwini body plan

When compared to O. porrectus, the red-lipped batfish has a smaller disk size but a higher fibre pectoral fin ray count. Regarding the number of scales along the lateral line, there are four to nine subopercular scales, six to nine on the cheek, usually. The red-lipped batfish has 19 to 20 vertebrae.

The large, lateral eyes provide a wide field of vision, allowing the fish to detect prey and predators effectively. Positioned high on the head, they allow the fish to remain hidden on the seabed while observing its surroundings.

Although the fish's bright red lips attract attention, it can camouflage itself by changing its body color to blend with the sand or rocks on the ocean floor. This adaptation helps it ambush prey and evade predators.

== Diet and feeding strategies ==
Red-lipped batfish are piscivores and invertivores and tend to be more active at night, mainly feeding on other small fish and small invertebrates including shrimp, crabs, worms and mollusks found on the seafloor.

A specialised fin ray (illicium) extends outwards on top of the fish's head. At the tip of it is an esca emitting a bright light. In deep waters, this light lures the prey to the batfish's mouth.

After the red-lipped batfish fully matures, its dorsal fin becomes a single spine-like projection, allowing the fish to lure prey near them.

The red-lipped batfish uses suction feeding. By expanding its buccal cavity, the fish generates a rapid influx of water, letting the prey into the mouth, even in benthic environments where mobility is limited. The fish's specialized jaw protrusion plays a role in enhancing this process by increasing the volume of water into the mouth, improving the effectiveness of prey capture. Additionally, the batfish's suction feeding strategy aligns with observations across teleost fishes, which use this method to ambush and capture small, non-evasive prey such as shrimp and crabs. This adaptation is crucial, given the batfish's preference for walking along the ocean floor – rather than swimming actively – which typically hinders high-speed chases.

== Reproduction ==
Male red-lipped batfish engage in a distinctive courtship dance, swaying their bodies and shaking their heads to attract females. Once a female is interested, the pair participates in a ritual dance and mate. After mating, females lay sticky eggs that adhere to the ocean floor. Males are responsible for guarding the eggs, fanning them with their fins to maintain oxygen flow and protect them from predators until they hatch.

These fish exhibit communicative behaviors within small groups through body movements. They wiggle or sway their fins, likely signaling territory claims or intentions during mating seasons. This physical communication ensures harmony and aids in social bonding within their habitat.

== Habitat ==
Red-lipped batfish can be found at depths of 3 to 76 m (10 to 250 ft) in the Pacific Ocean around the Galápagos Islands off Ecuador. Batfish are bottom dwellers, usually found in the sand or near the ocean floor. Although considered shallow-water forms, they occasionally come to the surface over deep water. They tend to associate themselves with the edges of reefs, up to about 120 m deep.

== Adaptations and unique features ==
The pectoral, pelvic, and anal fins have evolved to function like limbs, allowing the batfish to "walk" along the ocean floor. When moving, it tucks its fins and propels forward in a way similar to a frog's gait, which enhances its ability to maneuver among rocky or sandy substrate.

Besides its bright red lips, the batfish can also change the color of its skin to blend with the environment. This defense mechanism makes it almost invisible among coral reefs and helps avoid predators.

== Predators and threats ==
The red-lipped batfish has no known direct threats. However, rising sea temperatures and coral bleaching could pose a threat, as it would alter the natural habitat and may cause a decline in the availability of a natural food source.

As bottom-dwellers, batfish are at higher risk of ingesting microplastics or becoming entangled in discarded fishing gear. Ongoing initiatives to reduce plastic pollution in the Galápagos marine ecosystem can indirectly benefit the species.
