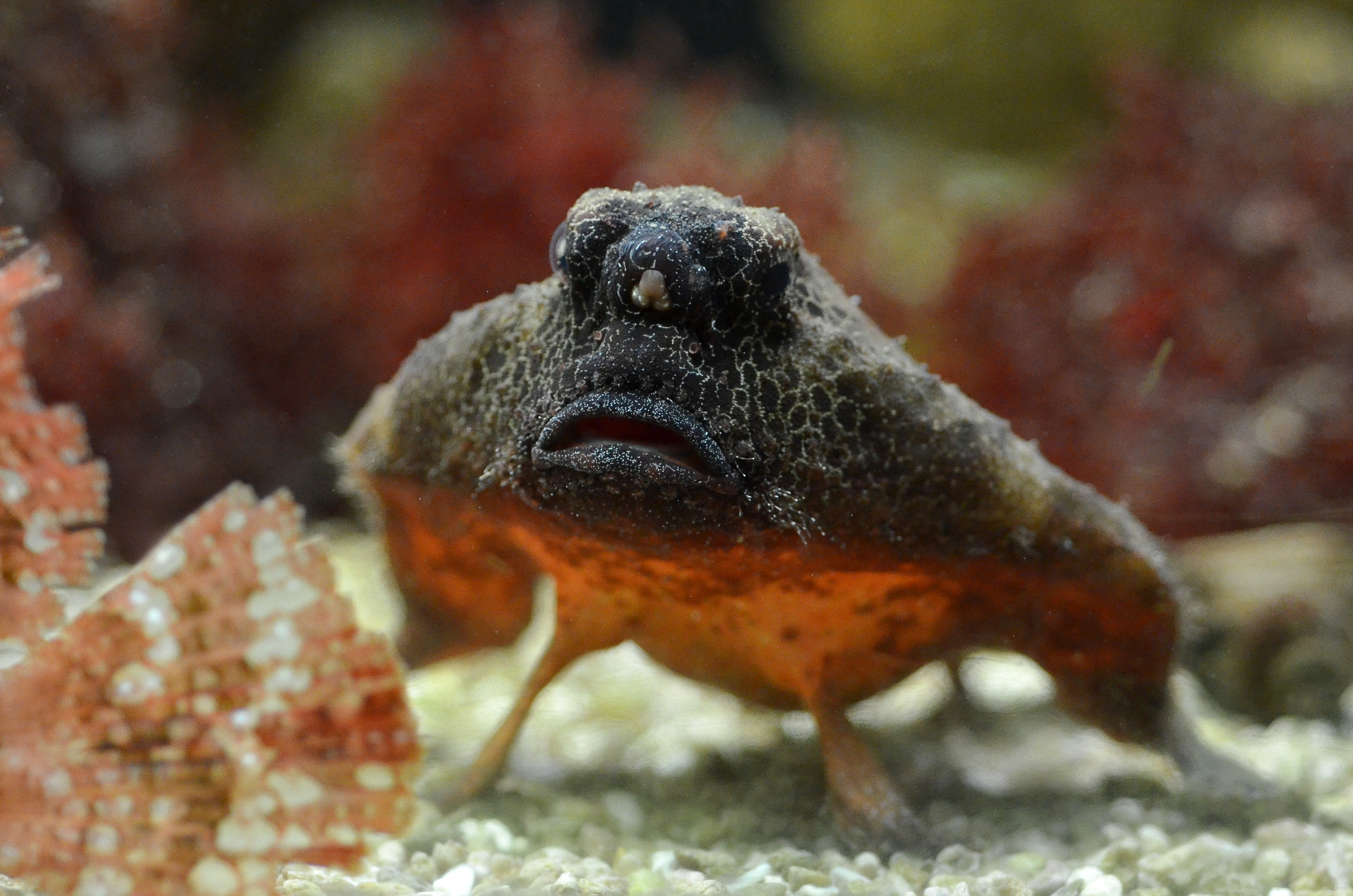

Conservation status
- Least Concern (IUCN 3.1)

Scientific classification
- Kingdom: Animalia
- Phylum: Chordata
- Class: Actinopterygii
- Order: Lophiiformes
- Family: Ogcocephalidae
- Genus: Ogcocephalus
- Species: O. nasutus

Binomial name
- Ogcocephalus nasutus (G. Cuvier, 1829)

Synonyms
- Malthe nasuta Cuvier, 1829; Ogcoephalus nasutus (Cuvier, 1829)

= Ogcocephalus nasutus =

Species of fish

Ogcocephalus nasutus, the shortnose batfish, is a species of ray-finned fish belonging to the family Ogcocephalidae, the deep sea batfishes. This species is found in the western Atlantic Ocean and the Caribbean.

== Taxonomy ==
Ogcocephalus masutus was first formally described in 1829 as Malthe nasuta with no type locality given. Achille Valenciennes collected specimens from Martinique, Saint Domingue and, erroneously, New York and Valencieenes is sometimes credited as the author with the date of the description given as 1837. The genus Ogcocephalus is classified within the "Eastern Pacific/Western Atlantic clade" of the family Ogcocephalidae. The family Ogcocephalidae is classified in the monotypic suborder Ogcocephaloidei within the order Lophiiformes, the anglerfishes in the 5th edition of Fishes of the World.

== Etymology ==
Ogcocephalus nasutus is a member of the genus Ogcocephalus, the name of which is a combination of ogkos, which means "hook", and cephalus, meaning "head", an allusion to the pointed rostrum on the snout of the type species. The specific name nasutus, means "long-nosed, a reference to the pointed snout and well developed rostrum, although this varies in length from a short knob to a conical projection or a long finger-like protuberance. This species has a common name which is the opposite of its specific name.

== Description ==
Ogcocephalus nasutus has a flattened head, although this is higher than the rest of the triangular disk, with a pointed snout. The rostrum is well-developed and horn-like and is very variable in its length and shape, the shape varies from a short knob to a broad-based cone toa long, finger-like protuberance. The horn typically points upwards but may be directed downwards. The esca, or lure, has 3 fleshy points which is retracted into the illicial cavity under the rostrum. There is a blunt, poorly developed, simple spine on the lower, posterior angle of the operculum. The gill rakers are oval shaped plates which are covered in small teeth and the gill openings are small, opening behind the upper base of the pectoral fin this fin and the pelvic fin's are limb-like with the pectoral fins not widely attached to the body. The dorsal and anal fins are small, the dorsal fin is covered in skin and is on the tail while the anal fin is fleshy and under the tail. The upper surface of the body is covered in large buckler-like scales and with conical spines, the lower surface of the body has a complete covering of pointed, bony scales and the underside of the tail has a dense covering of small spines, apart from a few conical spines on its midline. They are variable in color from blackish to gray-brown to light gray to reddish-brown on the upper body. It may be plain in color or have a reticulated pattern of dark and pale blotches, which vary in extent, on the face and in a thin band on the shoulders and along the tail. The pectoral fin is sometimes plain but it can be edged with dark color, the caudal fin is dark with a wide light-colored band across its middle. The lips are brown to reddish. There is typically a vague dark ribng towards the tips of the rostrum. The lower body and mouth may be red. The shortnose batfish has a maximum published total length of 38 cm (15 in).

== Distribution and habitat ==
Ogcocephalus nasutus is found in the Western Atlantic Ocean where it occurs from North Carolina along the southeastern coast of the United States to the Bahamas. It is also found in the Gulf of Mexico off northwestern Cuba from the Florida Keys east to the mouth of the Rio Grande and in the whole of the Caribbean Sea including the northern coast of South America as far west as French Guiana. It is found at depths between 0 and 305 m (0 and 1,001 ft) on substrates consistiong of sand, mud and rubble or among seagrass.

== Biology ==
Ogcocephalus masutus preys on mollusks, crabs, fishes and polychaetes. Batfishes have pelagic eggs and larvae, the larvae metamorphose into juveniles when they settle on the bottom.
