= Ogcocephalus porrectus =

Conservation status
- Least Concern (IUCN 3.1)

Scientific classification
- Kingdom: Animalia
- Phylum: Chordata
- Class: Actinopterygii
- Order: Lophiiformes
- Family: Ogcocephalidae
- Genus: Ogcocephalus
- Species: O. porrectus

Binomial name
- Ogcocephalus porrectus Garman, 1899

Species of fish

Ogcocephalus porrectus, the rosy-lipped batfish, is endemic to Cocos Island off the Pacific coast of Costa Rica. Though members of Ogcocephalidae occur in tropical, warm waters in both the Western Atlantic and Eastern Pacific. Rosy-lipped batfish generally reside in shallow to deep water benthic zones with a bathymetric range of 35 – 150 m. The syntypic series was collected at 120 m on a rocky bottom. What makes this fish distinctive are its rosy red lips, specialized pectoral fins used for "walking", and an illicium used for attracting prey.

== Physical description ==
The most distinctive structure of Ogcocephalus porrectus is its illicium, which is thought to be derived from its dorsal fin spine as it is in most Lophiiformes. The anterior tip of the illicium bears a fleshy organ known as the esca, which appears as two bulbous lobes in O. porrectus. Ogcocephalus porrectus, along with other members of the Ogcocephalidae, only possess two bony elements in the illicium, in contrast to other sub-orders in the Lophiiformes. O. porrectus does not possess the posterior dorsal spine, and the anterior spine is very short and housed within the esca. The illicium and esca are contained within an illicial cavity covered in a scaleless skin. The illicial cavity is covered by an overhanging shelf-like triangular rostrum, which is made of modified scales and is equal in length to the width of the skull. When the illicium is retracted the scaleless skin folds in an accordion-like shape, which allows for the forward and downward movement of the esca upon protrusion.

Rosy-lipped batfish are dorsoventrally flattened, slightly concave anterior-laterally with a depressed head but well-elevated cranium in relation to the discoid body. The sides of the caudal region are slightly convex so that a cross-section of the region is triangular. They possess well-developed conical, stiff scales that overlap very little. They have three types of scales: a simple cone-shaped spine-tipped scale, known as a tubercle; a buckler, which is a multi-spined cone-shaped scale with the spines proceeding from the apex in a direct line down the scale; and a scale associated with the lateral line system. Ogcocephalus porrectus is covered mostly by bucklers, which afford it armor-like protection. The distinctive scale on the lateral line system has a hole in the cup-shaped bottom through which the spinal nerve reaches the neuromast and has prongs extending upwards allowing for sheaths of epidermis to cover and protect the neuromast. The lateral line system includes three series tracing the lips, cheeks, and eyes of the expanded head, and a series extending the length of the body beginning posterior to the eyes, down the dorsal disk to the base of the caudal fin.

The standard length of the lectotype is 147 mm, but this was the largest of the syntypes. The syntypes, as designated by Garman (1899), have an average standard length of 73.5 mm.

The mouth is terminal and minute, conical teeth are in bands on the jaws, palatines, and vomer. The gill openings are small and are found dorsally on the posterior region of the discoid body. The rosy-lipped batfish only has two and a half gills, with none appearing on the reduced first gill arch.

Ogcocephalus porrectus has 2 or 3 dorsal fin rays and 14 pectoral fin rays. The pectoral fins are angled horizontally and splayed out at the posterior end of the disk. They resemble and serve as a supporting appendage for "walking" more so than a fin for swimming. The pelvic fins are much reduced and found ventrally on the disk and anterior to the pectoral fins. The anal fin is small and elongate.

Preserved specimens are usually pale, but a pair of distinct dark blotches are found near the middle of the disk and are about as long as the snout. Though Garman (1899) described specimens as olivaceous dorsally and white ventrally, Hubbs (1958) and Bradbury (1980) report a vivid range of reddish colors on the dorsal side, including the fins and lips, hence their common name.

== Food habits ==
The esca of O. porrectus is not thought to visually attract prey, but there is evidence that O. cubifrons excretes a chemical attractant from the esca to lure prey. Batfish species mainly consume small benthic invertebrates. Hubbs (1958) denoted small molluscs, snails and crabs, as the main diet of O. darwini.

== Other comments ==
Garman first described Ogcocephalus porrectus in 1899. His description was based upon four specimens designated as syntypes. In 1958, C.L. Hubbs designated the largest of the syntypes as the holotype, but this was revised in 1962 by Bradbury, who changed the designation to lectotype and thereby designating the others paralectotypes.

Derouen et al. (2015) concluded that Ogcocephalidae diverged within the Lophiiformes about 54 million years ago and originated in the disphotic zone at the area of transition between the continental shelf and slope. Based on fossil calibrated molecular phylogeny, they also determined the Eastern Pacific and Western Atlantic lineages of Ogcocephalus species are monophyletic and the sister taxon of Antennarioidei within the Lophiiformes.

This species is not listed as threatened or endangered, although there is significant risk as by-catch.
