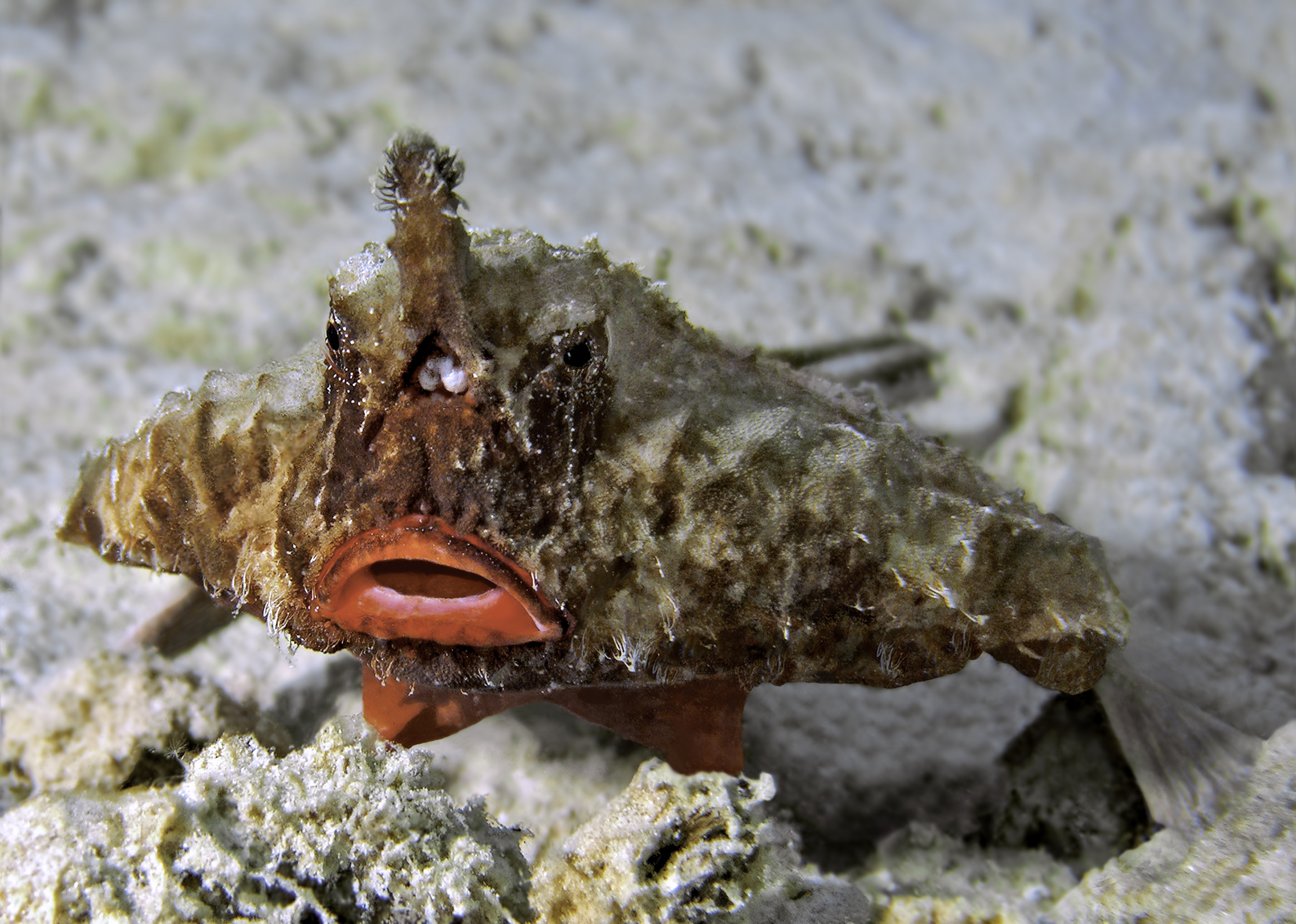
- Specimen at Bari Reef, Bonaire

Conservation status
- Least Concern (IUCN 3.1)

Scientific classification
- Kingdom: Animalia
- Phylum: Chordata
- Class: Actinopterygii
- Division: Teleostei
- Order: Lophiiformes
- Family: Ogcocephalidae
- Genus: Ogcocephalus
- Species: O. corniger

Binomial name
- Ogcocephalus corniger Bradbury, 1980
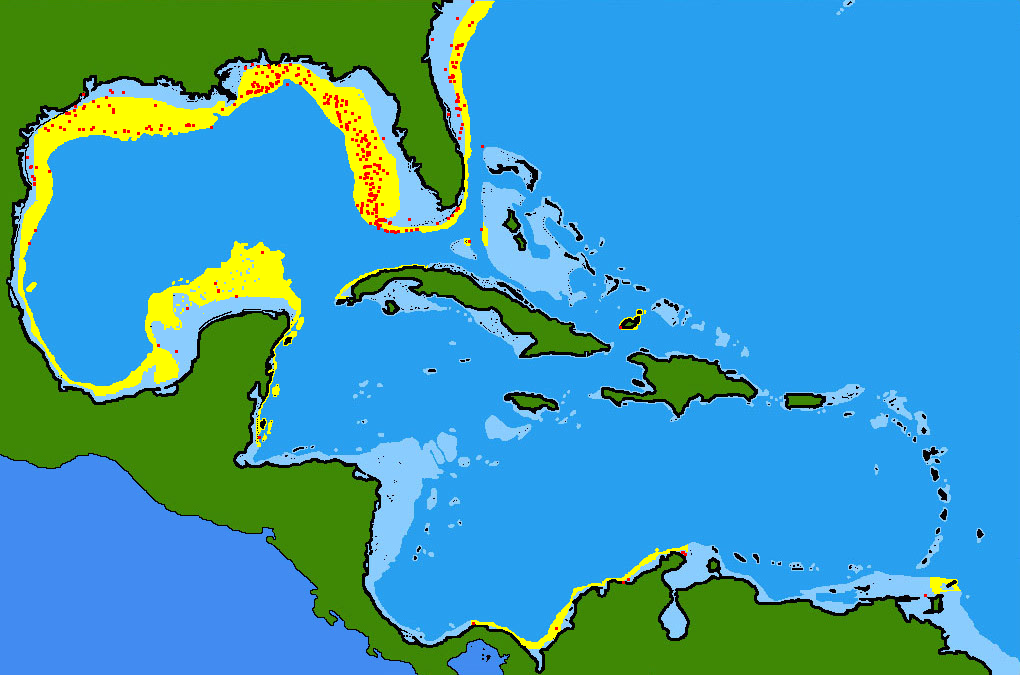

= Ogcocephalus corniger =

Species of fish

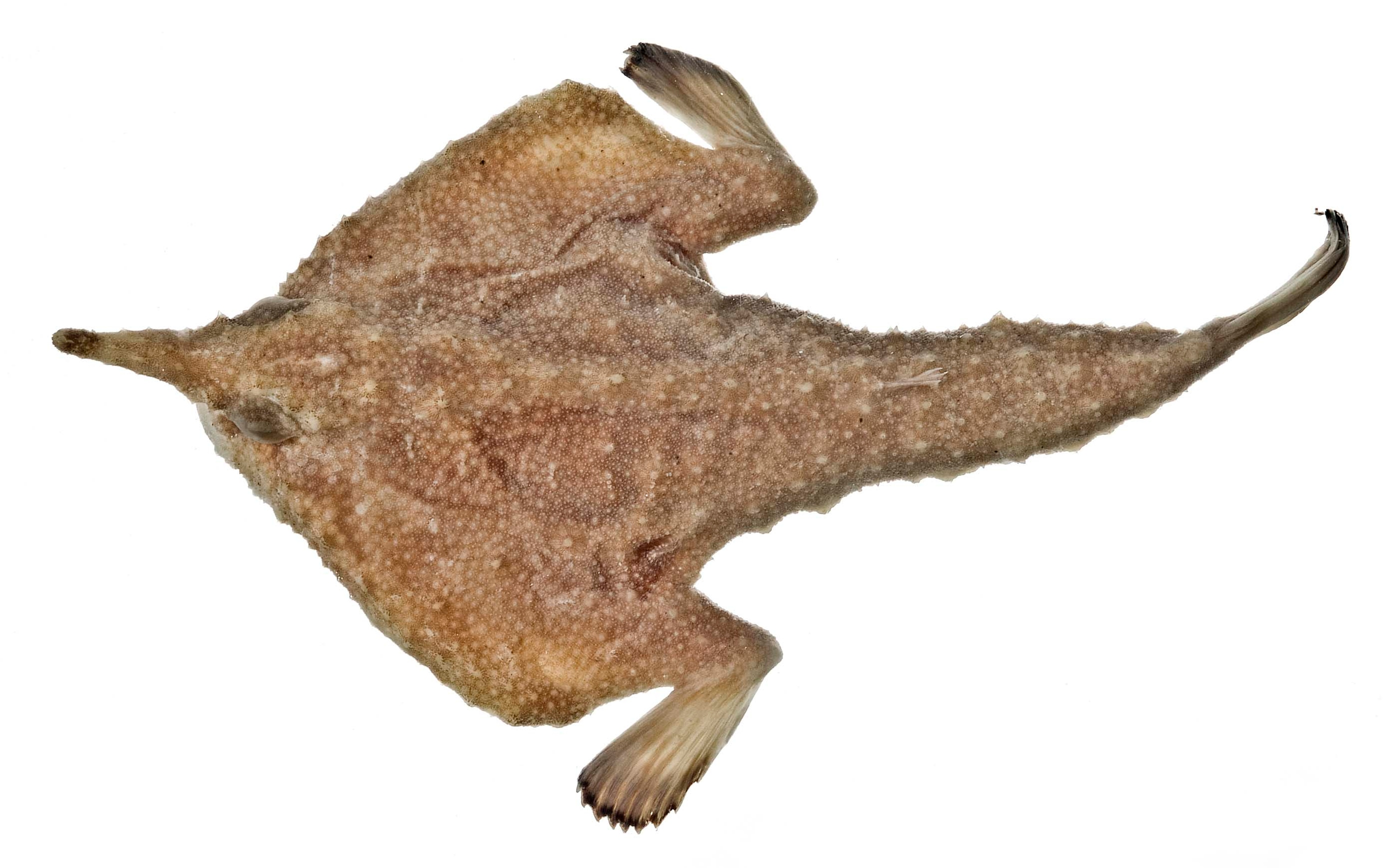
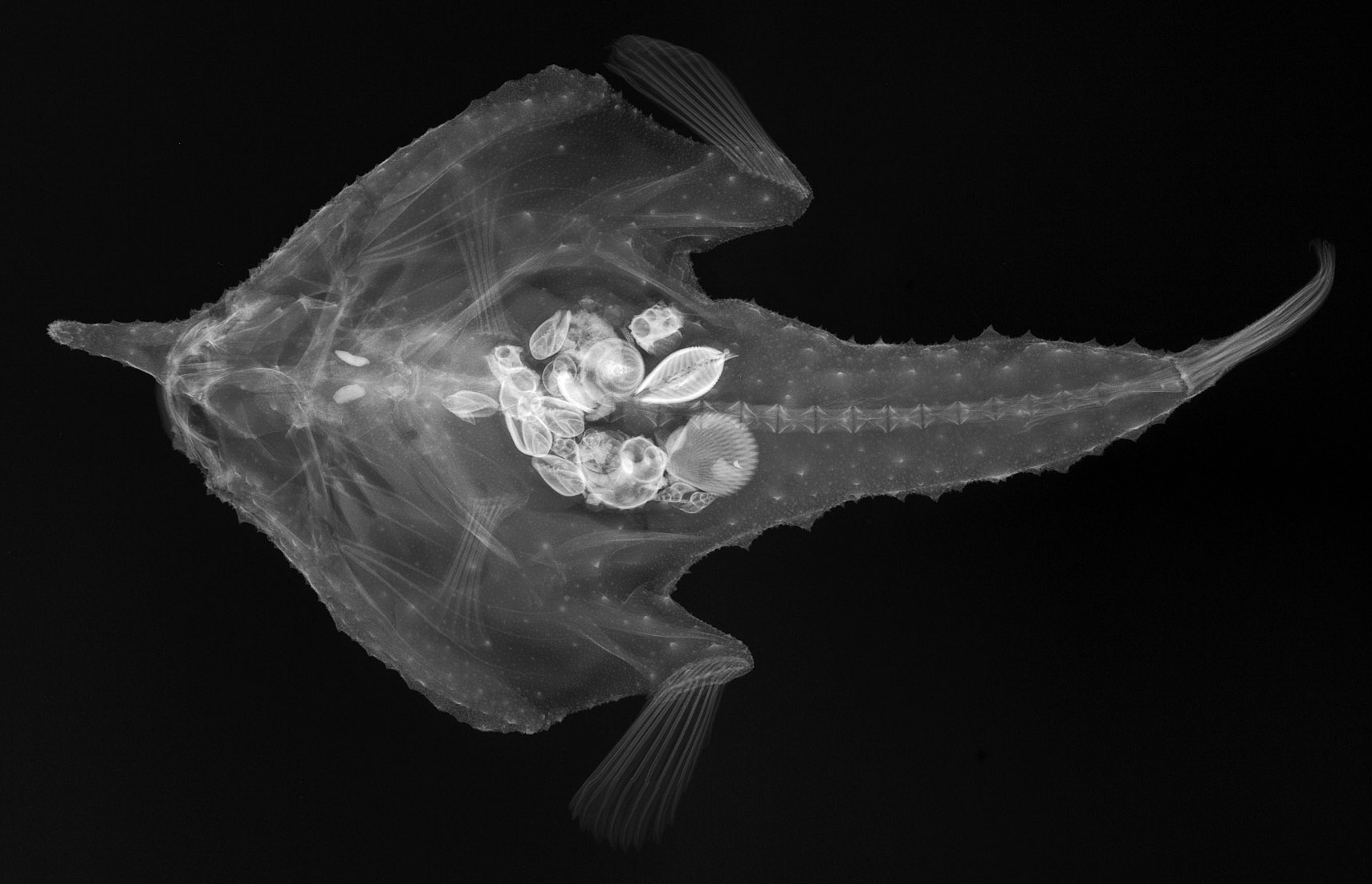
Ogcocephalus corniger, conventional image and X-ray image, showing the stomach content

Ogcocephalus corniger, the longnose batfish, is a species of ray-finned fish belonging to the family Ogcocephalidae, the deep sea batfishes. This fish is found at depths between 29 and 230 m (95 and 755 ft) in the Atlantic Ocean, ranging from North Carolina to the Gulf of Mexico and the Bahamas. Like other members of the family Ogcocephalidae, it has a flat triangular body with coloring varying from yellowish to purple with pale, round spots. The lips are orange-red. Projecting from its head is a characteristic structure that is shared by other anglerfish.

== Taxonomy ==
Ogcocephalus corniger was first formally described in 1980 by the American ichthyologist Margaret G. Bradbury with its type locality given as the Gulf coast of Florida at 29°00'N, 85°01'W from a depth 16–20 fathoms (96–120 ft; 29–37 m). The genus Ogcocephalus is classified within the "Eastern Pacific/Western Atlantic clade" of the family Ogcocephalidae. The family Ogcocephalidae is classified in the monotypic suborder Ogcocephaloidei within the order Lophiiformes, the anglerfishes in the 5th edition of Fishes of the World.

== Etymology ==
Ogcocephalus corniger is a member of the genus Ogcocephalus, the name of which is a combination of ogkos, which means "hook", and cephalus, meaning "head", an allusion to the pointed rostrum on the snout of the type species. The specific name corniger, suffixes cornus, meaning "horn", with niger, meaning "to bear", an allusion to the long and upwards pointing rostrum on the snout of this species.

== Description ==
Ogcocephalus corniger has a flattened head, although this is higher than the rest of the triangular disk, with a long pointed snout which extends a long distance past the eyes. The eyes are laterally positioned on the head. The esca, or lure, has 3 fleshy points which is retracted into the illicial cavity under the rostrum. There is a blunt, poorly developed, simple spine on the lower, posterior angle of the operculum. The gill rakers are oval shaped plates which are covered in small teeth and the gill openings are small, opening behind the upper base of the pectoral fin, this fin and the pelvic fin's are limb-like with the pectoral fins not widely attached to the body. The dorsal and anal fins are small, the dorsal fin is covered in skin and is on the tail while the anal fin is fleshy and under the tail. The upper surface of the body is covered in large buckler-like scales and with conical spines, the lower surface of the body has a complete covering of pointed, bony scales and the underside of the tail has a dense covering of small spines, apart from a few conical spines on its midline. The upper body is chocolate brown to dark reddish brown in color, with many small pearly gray spots, these spots are the unpigmented tips of the bucklers. The lips are a vivid vermilion and the lower body has an orange-red tint. There is an ill-defined dark ring on the rostrum close to its tip. The iris is spotted, with no radiating lines. The pectoral fins are orange to yellow to purplish, with wide dusky margins and white tips to the fin rays. The pads on the underside of the pectoral fin are white. The color of the pelvic fins is orange-red frequently with dark tips. The distal third of the anal fin is dark to black, the dorsal fin is dusky and frequently has 1 or 2 pale stripes. The caudal fin is brown on its base, orange in the middle with a black margin. The longnose batfish has a maximum published total length of 23 cm (9.1 in).

== Distribution and habitat ==
Ogcocephalus corniger is found in the Western Atlantic Ocean as far north as the coast of North Carolina southwards along the eastern coast of the United States to the Bahamas. It also occurs in the Gulf of Mexico from the Florida Keys north and west along the Gulf coast into Mexico as far south as Tampico and off Campeche and Yucatán. In the Caribbean Sea the longnose batfish is found from Mexico to Belize, and again from Colón in Panama to the Guajira Peninsula in Colombia. Vagrants have been recorded as far north as New York. This species is typically found on sandy substrates at depths between 29 and 230 m (95 and 755 ft).

== Biology ==
Ogcocephalus corniger is a demersal fish, of which little is known of its biology. Batfishes are ambush predators and their prey typically comprises small gastropods, bivalves, crustaceans, worms and the occasional small fish. The eggs and larvae are pelagic, the larvae undergo metamorphosis when they settle on the bottom. The rostrum is moveable and this fish stays motionless on the sea bed, moving the rostrum back and forth. This lures in prey and the batfish the opens its mouth, sucking the prey in. It is a poor swimmer and when they have to move they do so by walking on the substrate using the limb-like paired fins, and has been observed to jump, crawl and walk. If threatened this fish can quickly bury itself in the sediment. This species has lived to an age of 8 years old in captivity.
