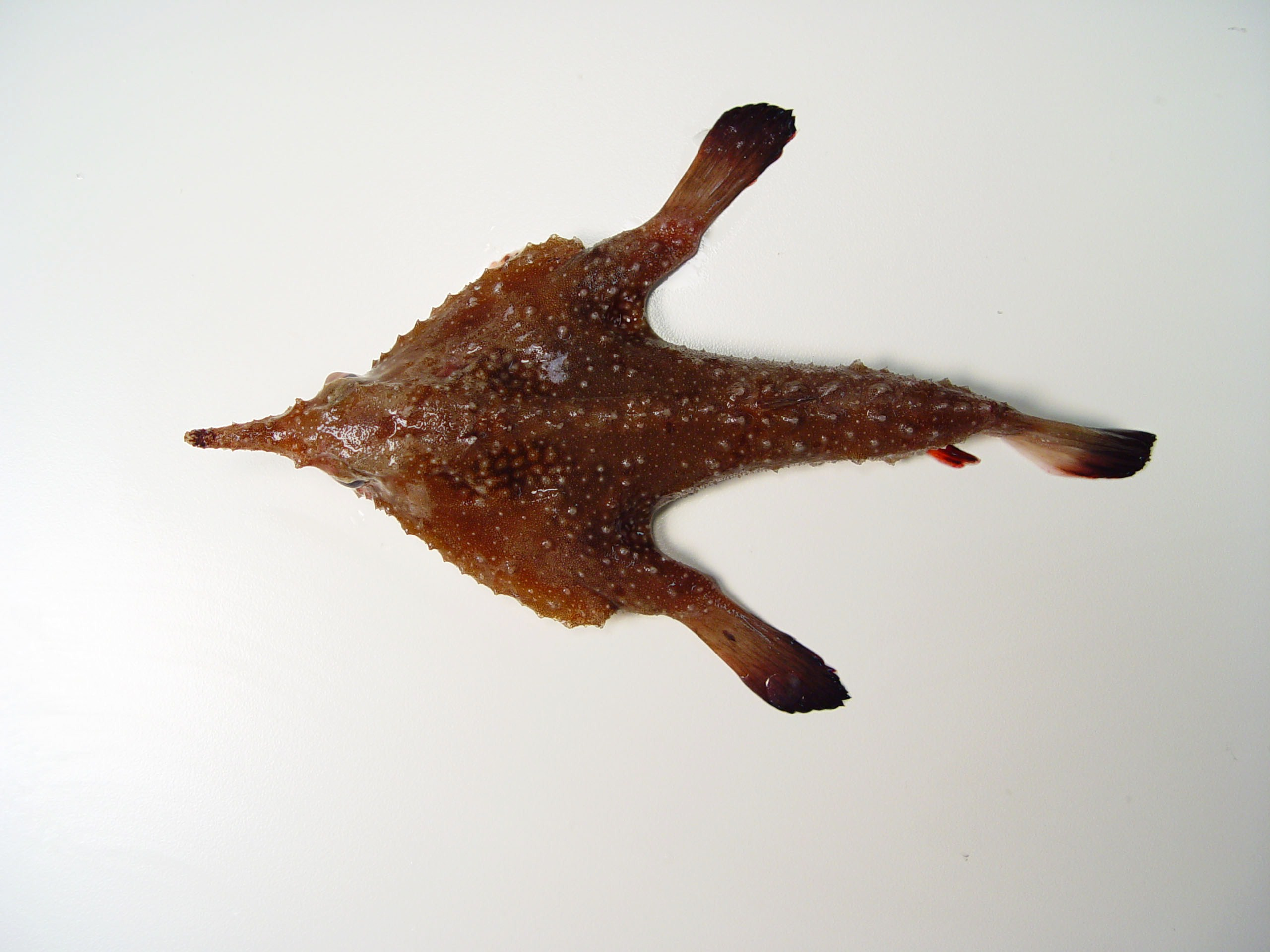

Conservation status
- Least Concern (IUCN 3.1)

Scientific classification
- Kingdom: Animalia
- Phylum: Chordata
- Class: Actinopterygii
- Order: Lophiiformes
- Family: Ogcocephalidae
- Genus: Ogcocephalus
- Species: O. pumilus

Binomial name
- Ogcocephalus pumilus Bradbury, 1980

= Ogcocephalus pumilus =

Species of fish

Ogcocephalus pumilus, the dwarf batfish, is a species of ray-finned fish belonging to the family Ogcocephalidae, the deep sea batfishes. It is found in the western Atlantic Ocean. It is the smallest species in the genus Ogcocephalus.

== Taxonomy ==
Ogcocephalus pumilus was first formally described in 1980 by the American ichthyologist Margaret G. Bradbury with its type locality given as Suriname at 7°5'N, 54°8'W, Oregon station 2018, from a depth of 35 fathoms (210 ft; 64 m). The genus Ogcocephalus is classified within the "Eastern Pacific/Western Atlantic clade" of the family Ogcocephalidae. The family Ogcocephalidae is classified in the monotypic suborder Ogcocephaloidei within the order Lophiiformes, the anglerfishes in the 5th edition of Fishes of the World.

== Etymology ==
Ogcocephalus pumilus is a member of the genus Ogcocephalus, the name of which is a combination of ogkos, which means "hook", and cephalus, meaning "head", an allusion to the pointed rostrum on the snout of the type species. The specific name pumilus, means "small", "little", "dwarfish" or "diminutive", a reference to the size of this species, the smallest fish in its genus.

== Description ==
Ogcocephalus pumilus has a low, flattened head and a triangular disc, with a pointed snout and a long slender rostrum. The esca has 3 fleshy points and it is retracted into a small illicial cavity beneath the rostrum. The eyes are on the sides of the head and it has a relatively small mouth. There is a blunt, poorly developed, simple spine on the lower, posterior angle of the operculum. The gill rakers are oval shaped plates which are covered in small teeth and the gill openings are small, opening behind the upper base of the pectoral fin, this fin and the pelvic fin's are limb-like with the pectoral fins not widely attached to the body. The dorsal and anal fins are small, the dorsal fin is covered in skin and is on the tail while the anal fin is fleshy and under the tail. he upper surface of the body is covered in large buckler-like scales and with conical spines, the lower surface of the body has a complete covering of pointed, bony scales and the underside of the tail has a dense covering of small spines, apart from a few conical spines on its midline. The overall colour is light grey, perhaps with a few pale grey spots but otherwise rather uniform. The maximum published standard length is 6.1 cm (2.4 in).

== Distribution and habitat ==
Ogcocephalus pumilus is found in the Western Atlantic Ocean where it has been recorded off the coast ofSurname and in the Caribbean where its presence has been confirmed from the Bahamas, Guyana, Honduras, Puerto Rico, Trinidad & Tobago and the United States Virgin Islands. Its presence elsewhere in the Caribbean needs to be confirmed. It is found at depths between 35 and 348 m (115 and 1,142 ft), on soft substrates.
