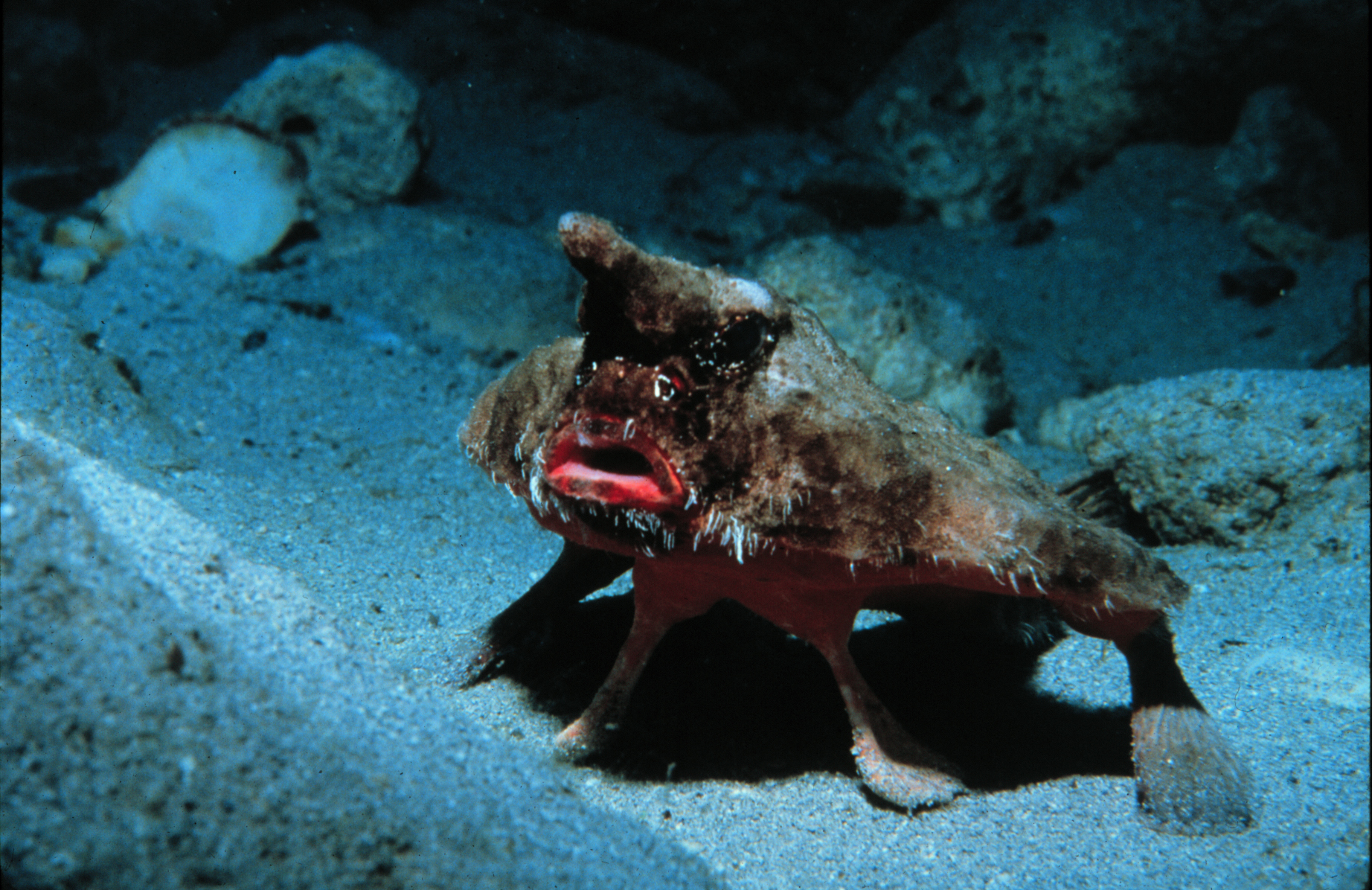
- Roughback batfish, Ogcocephalus parvus

Scientific classification
- Kingdom: Animalia
- Phylum: Chordata
- Class: Actinopterygii
- Order: Lophiiformes
- Family: Ogcocephalidae
- Genus: Ogcocephalus; G. Fischer, 1813

Type species
- Lophius vespertilio Linnaeus, 1758

Synonyms
- Brachionus Billberg, 1833; Malthe Cuvier, 1816

= Ogcocephalus =

Genus of fishes

Ogcocephalus is a genus of marine ray-finned fishes belonging to the family Ogcocephalidae, the deep sea batfishes. The species in this genus are found in the Eastern Pacific Ocean and Western Atlantic Ocean, with most species in the eastern Atlantic Ocean where they live at shallower depths than the other ogcocephalid genera.

== Taxonomy ==
Ogcocephalus was first proposed as a genus in 1813 by the German anatomist, entomologist and palaeontologist Gotthelf Fischer von Waldheim. Lophius vespertilio, which was described by Carl Linnaeus in the 10th edition of Systema Naturae published in 1758, is designated as the type species, probably designated by David Starr Jordan and Barton Warren Evermann in 1896. This genus is classified within the "Eastern Pacific/Western Atlantic clade" of the family Ogcocephalidae. The family Ogcocephalidae is classified in the monotypic suborder Ogcocephaloidei within the order Lophiiformes, the anglerfishes in the 5th edition of Fishes of the World.

== Etymology ==
Ogcocephalus is a combination of ogkos, which means "hook", and cephalus, meaning "head", an allusion to the pointed rostrum on the snout of the type species.

== Species ==
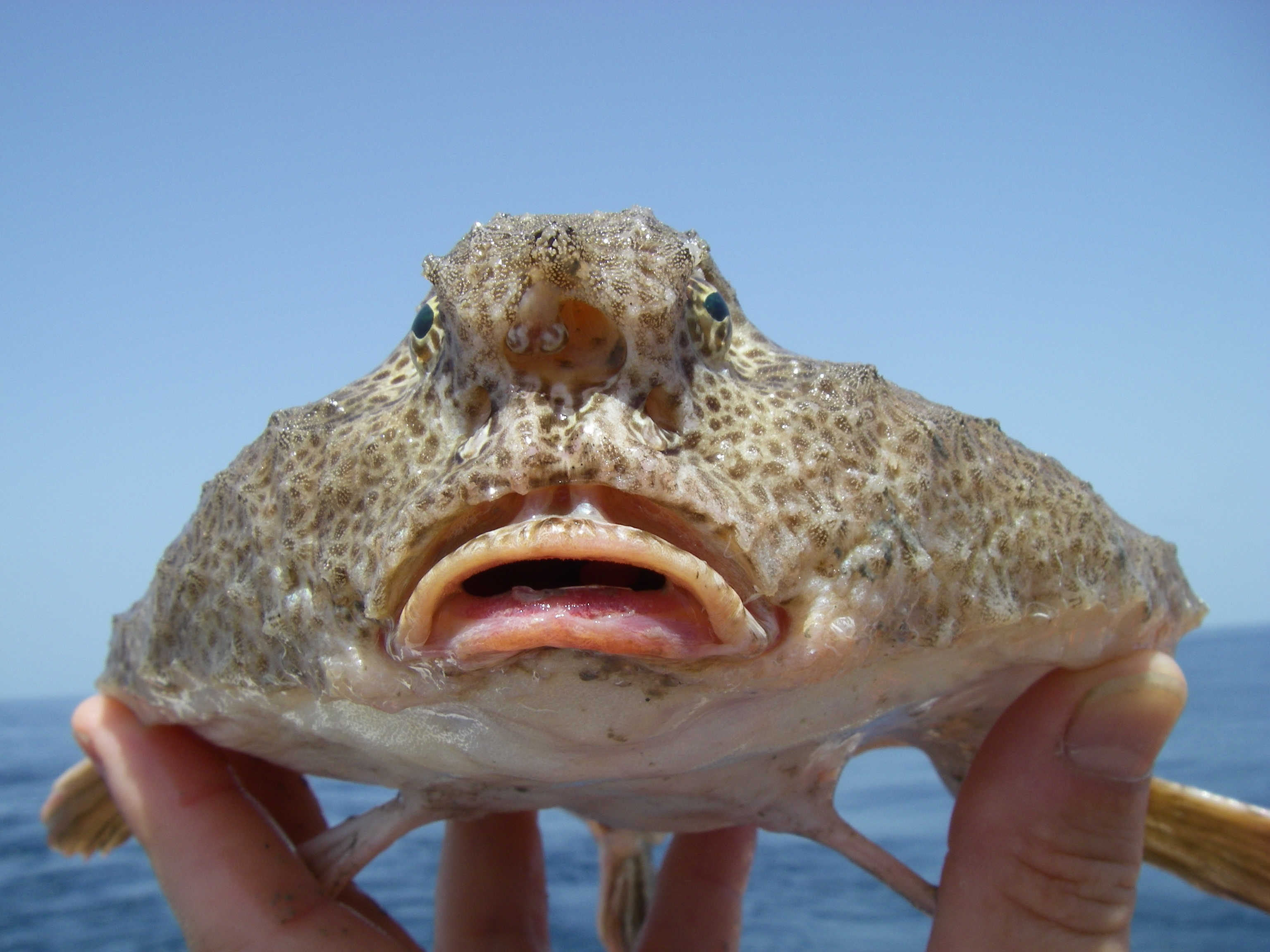
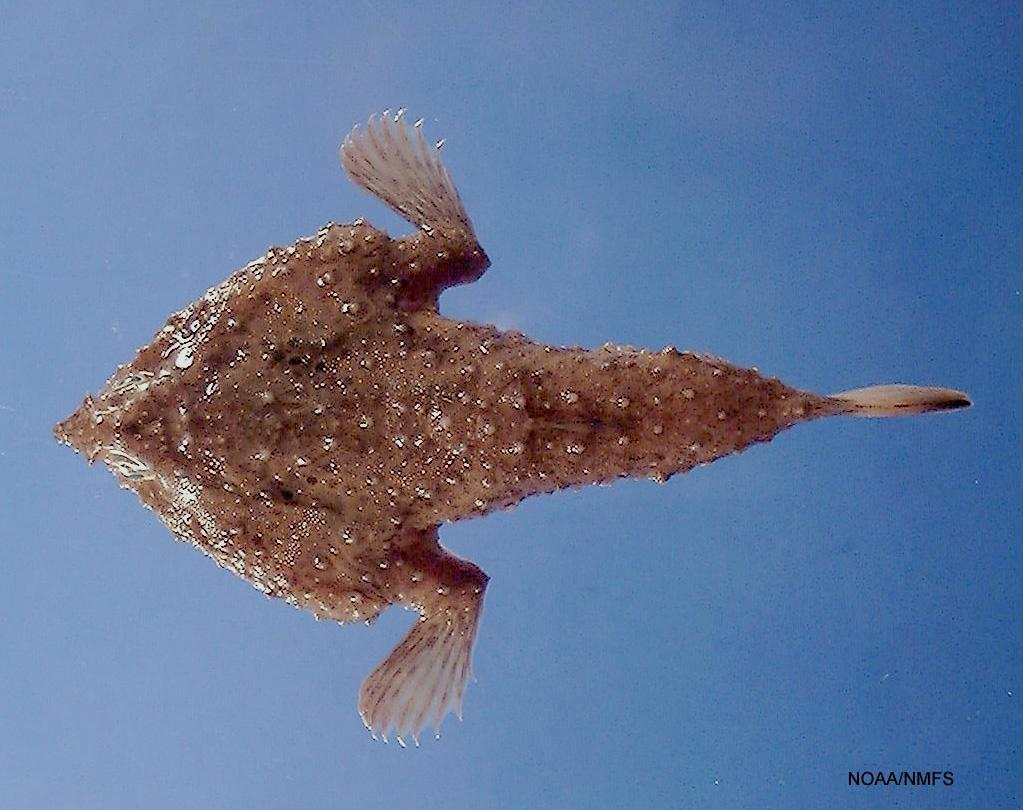
Slantbrow batfish (Ogcocephalus declivirostris)

There are currently 13 recognized species in this genus:

- Ogcocephalus corniger Bradbury, 1980 (Longnose batfish)
- Ogcocephalus cubifrons (J. Richardson, 1836) (Spotted batfish)
- Red-lipped batfish, Ogcocephalus darwini C. L. Hubbs, 1958 (Red-lipped batfish, Galápagos batfish)
- Ogcocephalus declivirostris Bradbury, 1980 (Slantbrow batfish)
- Ogcocephalus nasutus (G. Cuvier, 1829) (Shortnose batfish)
- Ogcocephalus notatus Valenciennes, 1837 (Oval batfish)
- Ogcocephalus pantostictus Bradbury, 1980 (Spotted batfish)
- Ogcocephalus parvus Longley & Hildebrand, 1940 (Roughback batfish)
- Ogcocephalus porrectus Garman, 1899 (Rosy-lipped batfish)
- Ogcocephalus pumilus Bradbury, 1980 (Dwarf batfish)
- Ogcocephalus radiatus Mitchill, 1818 (Polka-dot batfish)
- Ogcocephalus rostellum Bradbury, 1980 (Palefin batfish)
- Ogcocephalus vespertilio (Linnaeus, 1758) (Brazilian batfish, Seadevil)

== Characteristics ==
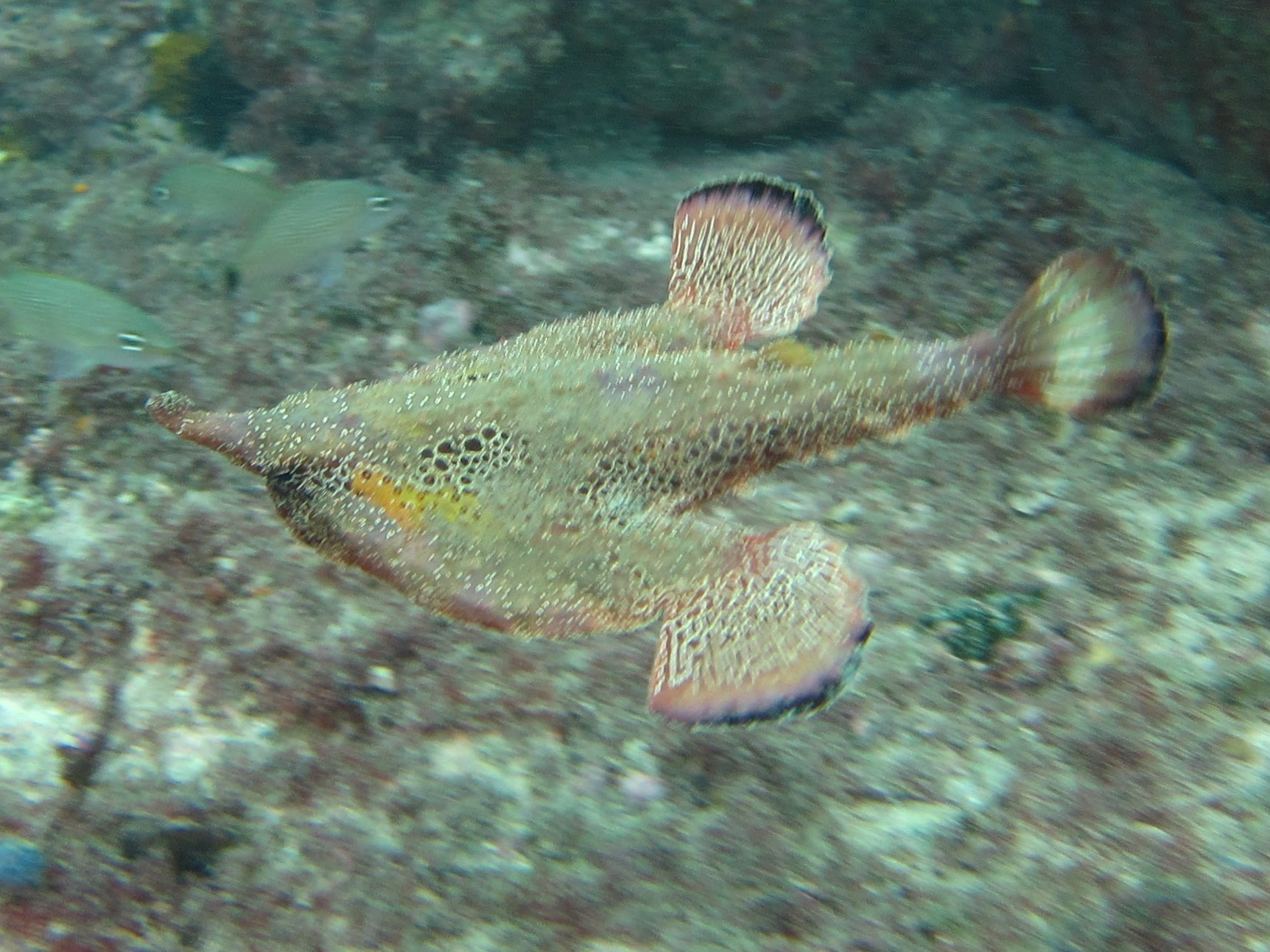
Ogcocephalus vespertilio swimming

Ogcocephalus batfishes are characterised by having a flattened head, although this is raised above the disc of the body which is triangular in shape. The flattened head and body of these fishes is often referred to as the "disc" and is made up of the head and the body as far as the axilla of the pelvic fins, the forward edge of the disc is made up of the extended bones of the operculum sweeping backwards from the cranium and surrounding the trunk on either side. The horn-like rostrum on the snout varies from short to long and projects far beyond the eyes. The esca has 3 fleshy points and is kept on a small illivial cavity us small and is located under the rostrum. There is a spine at the angle of the operculum which is blunt or small, or to may be large but has no spinules. The gill rakers are oval-shaped plates with a covering of small teeth. The eyes are on the sides of the head. The gill openings are small and are located to the rear of the upper bases of the pectoral fin. The pectoral and pelvic fins are resemble limbs and the pectoral fins are wholly separate from body. The small dorsal and anal fins are covered in skin and are located on the upper and lower surfaces of the tail. The dorsal surface of the body has scales that resemble large bucklers and conical spines. The ventral surface of the body is wholly covered in pointed, bony scales while the ventral surface of the tail has a dense covering of small spines, sometimes with a small number of conical spines along its midline. The smallest species in the genus is the dwarf batfish (O. pumilus) with a maximum standard length of 6.2 cm (2.4 in) while the largest is the seadevil (O. vespertilio) with a standard length of 30.5 cm (12.0 in).

== Distribution and habitat ==
Ogcocephalus batfishes are found in the tropical and temperate seas of the Americas with 2 species in the Eastern Pacific Ocean and 11 in the Western Atlantic Ocean. In the Atlantic Ocean the fishes in this genus occur from Cape Hatteras south as far as Uruguay. They are found in shallower waters than other genera in the family Ogcocephalidae with most specimens taken at depths of less than 100 m (330 ft), a few at depths up to 200 m (660 ft) and, exceptionally, from depths greater than 350 m (1,150 ft).

== See also ==
- List of prehistoric bony fish
