= Geology of Guatemala =

The geology of Guatemala encompasses rocks divided into two tectonic blocks. The Maya Block in the north has igneous and metamorphic North American Craton basement rocks, overlain by late Paleozoic metasedimentary rocks, which experienced deformation during the Devonian. Red beds, evaporites and marine limestone from the Mesozoic overlie these rocks. A karst landscape formed in the thick limestone units across the north of the country. During a collisional orogeny, these Paleozoic and Mesozoic rocks were uplifted, thrust and folded as the Central Guatemalan Cordillera. Paleogene rocks from the early Cenozoic include volcanic and marine clastic rocks, associated with high rates of erosion.

By contrast, to the south of the Motagua Valley, the underlying rocks belong to the Chortis Block—the northern section of the Caribbean Plate. Many geologists have interpreted the Chortis Block as having "translated" eastward to its present position, with Cretaceous brittle deformation and uplift suggesting a connection to the Laramide orogeny building up the Rocky Mountains to the north.

Particularly within the Quaternary, the Cocos Plate which split off the Pacific Plate in the Oligocene has subducted beneath the Caribbean and North American plates, producing a chain of volcanoes along the Pacific Coast of Guatemala. The North American and Caribbean plates are moving with strike-slip displacement along the Motagua-Polochic Fault Zone.

Some have looked to the Paleozoic organic shales and the Todos Santos sandstone, with its evaporite "cap" as a potential reservoir for oil and gas.

The Sierra de Santa Cruz Massif has an ophiolite zone with serpentized harzburgite around a two kilometer thick gabbro pluton with quartz diorite. The pluton is capped by pillow basalt, diabase, chert and limestone. These in turn are covered over by an additional layer of tuff chert, volcanogenic flysch and breccia with andesite and dacite lava.
