= Maya Region =

First-order subdivision of Mesoamerica

Maya Region: Maya Area; Maya Realm
- Historical region
- The Maya Region / major rivers, mountain ranges, and regions labelled / 2015 map by S. Burchell

- Location within Mesoamerica
- Coordinates: 17°N 90°W
- Location: Belize, Guatemala, western El Salvador, northwestern Honduras, southeastern Mexico
- Part of: Mesoamerica

Area
  - Total: 125,000 mi^{2} (320,000 km^{2})^{a}

Dimensions
  - Length: 540 mi (870 km)^{b}
  - Width: 410 mi (660 km)^{b}
- Highest elevation: 13,845 ft (4,220 m)^{c} (Tajumulco Volcano)
- Subdivisions: Lowlands; Highlands; Pacific
- ^{a} cf (Note: As per Sharer & Traxler 2006, p. 23.)^{b} cf (Note: As per Sharer & Traxler 2006, p. 24 within 10 mi (16 km) accuracy. However, Adams & Macleod 2000a, p. 200 give these values as 550 mi (890 km) and 350 mi (560 km), respectively.)^{c} cf (Note: As per Goldberg 2008, para 1 and Sharer & Traxler 2006, p. 29, fig. 1.4.)

The Maya Region is cultural, first order subdivision of Mesoamerica, located in the eastern half of the latter. Though first settled by Palaeoindians by at least 10,000 BC, it is now most commonly characterised and recognised as the territory which encompassed the Maya civilisation in the pre-Columbian era.

== Extent ==
The Maya Region is firmly bounded to the north, east, and southwest by the Gulf of Mexico, the Caribbean Sea, and the Pacific Ocean, respectively. It is less firmly bounded to the west and southeast by 'zones of cultural interaction and transition between Maya and non-Maya peoples.' The western transition between Maya and non-Maya peoples roughly corresponds to the Isthmus of Tehuantepec, while the southeastern one roughly corresponds to a line running northwards from the mouth of the Lempa River to that of the Ulua River. (Note: Sharer & Traxler 2006, p. 28 draw the southeastern border as 'a line from the lower Lempa River in central El Salvador northward to Lake Yojoa and along the Ulua River to the Gulf of Honduras in the Caribbean Sea.' Adams & Macleod 2000a, p. 197 give the same as a line 'defined along the valleys of the Ulua [River], flowing north into the Caribbean, and the Lempa [River], running through central El Salvador to the Pacific.')

== Divisions ==
3 traditional divisions of Guatemala (note: Yucatán Peninsula not shown)

The Maya Region is traditionally divided into three cultural and geographic, first order subdivisions, namely, the Maya Lowlands, Maya Highlands, and the Maya Pacific. (Note: However, Adams & Macleod 2000a, p. 200 give the Region's traditional first order subdivisions as either (i) the Northern Lowlands, the Southern Lowlands, and the Highlands (including the Pacific), or as (ii) the Northern, Central, and Southern Areas. Carrasco 2006, article 'Mesoamerica' sec. 'Overview' para. 6, for instance, employ the first of these subdivisions (labelled (i)), while Coe & Houston 2015, ch. 1, fig. 1, and sec. 'Areas' employ the latter (labelled (ii)). Furthermore, some scholars prefer a simpler division of the Region into two first order subdivisions, namely, (i) the Lowlands and the Highlands (including the Pacific), or (ii) the Northern and Southern Areas. Adams & Macleod 2000a, pp. 203–204, for instance, employ the first of these (labelled (i)), while xx employ the latter (labelled (ii)).) The Region's internal borders, like some of its external ones, are not usually precisely fixed, as they are rather demarcated by 'subtle environmental changes or transitions from one zone to another.' Additionally, the Lowlands, Highlands, and Pacific are often further subdivided along similarly imprecise lines, giving rise to a myriad roughly-demarcated second order subdivisions for the Maya Region.

=== Lowlands ===
The Maya Lowlands are a low-lying karstic plain stretching (from west to east) from Campeche in Mexico through northern Guatemala and into northwestern Honduras, thereby encompassing all of the Yucatan Peninsula and its abutting plains (including all of Belize). The plain generally lies below 2,625 feet (800 m). (Note: The Maya Mountains top the 2,625 feet (800 m) mark, but are nonetheless encompassed by the Lowlands (Sharer & Traxler 2006, pp. 42).) Mean annual temperatures and rainfall range within 77–95 °F (25–35 °C) and 20–120 inches (510–3,050 mm), respectively. Wet seasons range from six to eleven months (usually starting in May or June), with dry seasons ranging from one to six month. (Note: Wet seasons given as lasting eight months, from May through December, in Coe & Houston 2015, ch. 1, sec. 'Setting,' para. 11.)

=== Highlands ===
The Maya Highlands are a geologically-active east-west band of peaks and valleys stretching from Tabasco in Mexico through central Guatemala and into northwestern Honduras, and generally topping 2,625 feet (800 m). Mean annual temperatures and rainfall range within 59–77 °F (15–25 °C) and 80–120 inches (2,000–3,000 mm), respectively. Wet seasons typically last eight months (May–December), with dry seasons typically compressed to four (January–April). (Note: Wet seasons given as lasting seven months, 'roughly from May through early November,' in Coe & Houston 2015, ch. 1, sec. 'Setting,' para. 3.) The Maya used the highlands to their advantage which they were able to build upon, highlighting their knowledge based on the land, "...food and eco-justice elements were demonstrated in the re-positioning of Indigenous knowledges and their broad connections from a global to a local setting in this community-based educational event."

=== Pacific ===
The Maya Pacific, also known as the Pacific Coastal Plain, is a fertile volcanic-sedimentary plain stretching along the Pacific coast from Chiapas in Mexico through southern Guatemala and into western El Salvador. Mean annual temperatures and rainfall range within 77–95 °F (25–35 °C) and 80–120 inches (2,000–3,000 mm), respectively. Wet seasons typically last eight months (May–December), with dry seasons typically compressed to four (January–April).

== Geography ==
=== Physical ===
The Maya Region is 'one of the most varied environments on earth.' Its terrain ranges from vast sea-level plains to near-inaccessible peaks topping 10,000 feet (3,000 m). Its soils range from rich alluvial and volcanic types to poor karstic ones, resulting in vegetation ranging from lush to sparse. Mean annual temperatures and rainfall range within 59–95 °F (15–35 °C) and 20–160 inches (500–4,000 mm), respectively. Wet seasons range from six to eleven months, with dry seasons ranging from one to six months. (Note: Though Adams & Macleod 2000a, p. 202 assert a June–November wet season, without immediately noting variation in its start-date nor duration.) Surface freshwater is readily available year-round in some areas, and virtually absent in others. Nonetheless, broadly speaking, the Region is described as featuring two geographic zones, namely, lowlands and highlands, with the former lying below circa 1,000–2,625 feet (305–800 m), and the latter above. Naturally, lowlands are predominantly found within the Maya Lowlands and Pacific, with highlands generally restricted to the Maya Highlands.

== Climate ==
Aridity index of the Maya Region

The Maya Region is generally described as having two climes, a cool, temperate one (prevalent in highlands), and a hot, tropical one (prevalent in lowlands). Each of these experiences two seasons, a wet one, and a dry one. Rainfall in the wet season is usually heaviest during June and October, and is thereby described as 'following a double-peaked distribution.'

Scholars had 'usually assumed that the climatic conditions which now [2010s] prevail in the Maya [Region] have always been the same, all through Maya prehistory and history[; b]ut recent palaeoclimatic research has challenged this assumption, revealing far more climatic fluctuation that previously anticipated.'

== Geology ==
=== History ===
==== Pre-Cenozoic ====
Middle America, including the Maya Region, is thought to have taken shape sometime after 170 million years ago. Its formation is thought to have 'involved [the] complex movement of [various] crustal blocks and terrains between the two pre-existing continental masses [ie North and South America].' Details of the pre-Cenozoic portion of this process (ie 170–67 million years ago), however, are not widely agreed upon. (Note: Bundschuh & Alvarado 2012, p. 10 suggest that geologic models of the formation of Middle America differ most significantly in their handling of the Caribbean Plate, with one group of models proposing its formation in the Pacific and subsequent movement to its present location, and another group proposing its formation in its present location.) Nonetheless, it has been proposed that the northern Lowlands were subaerially exposed by some 150 million years ago. (Note: However, it has been further proposed that this portion of the Lowlands was subsequently re-submerged during 130–72 million years ago, with thick carbonate deposition beginning by at least 80 million years ago (DTM 2013, sec. Mesozoic maps nos. NAM_key-130Ma_EarK to NAM_key-72Ma_LateK, Ahmad & Escalona 2014, sec. 'Introduction' and sec. 'Preliminary Results').)

==== Cenozoic ====
Details of the Cenozoic (ie 66–0 million years ago) geologic history of Middle America, including the Maya Region, are relatively more widely agreed upon. In broad strokes, the Maya Highlands and Pacific are thought to have been subaerially exposed by some 40 million years ago, with these being initially separated from the northern Lowlands by the incipient Bay of Honduras. The Bay is thought to have closed by at least 20 million years ago, thereby finally linking the northern and southern portions of the Maya Region together. (Note: The northern and eastern coasts of the Region, however, are not thought to have been fully subaerially exposed until some 5–2 million years ago (DTM 2013, sec. Cenozoic maps nos. NAM_key-5Ma_Plio and NAM_key_Pleist_Wisc). The Region's coastlines, which were initially more expansive than its present-day ones, are thought to have reached modern dimensions due to rising sea levels some 11–8 thousand years ago (DTM 2013, sec. Cenozoic maps nos. NAM_key_Present and NAM_key_Pleist_Holo).)

==== Timeline ====
Prominent geologic events in or relevant to the Maya Region. (Note: In the Unit column, million years ago written as Mya.)
| Start | End | Unit | Epoch | Event | Notes |
|---|---|---|---|---|---|
| 165 | 165 | Mya | Middle Jurassic | Gulf of Mexico seafloor spreading starts | inc. exposed northern Lowlands; cf |
| 144 | 144 | Mya | Early Cretaceous | Caribbean Sea seafloor spreading starts | cf (Note: Alternative models date the formation of the present-day Caribbean to during 130–80 million years ago (Bundschuh & Alvarado 2012, p. 211).) |
| 120 | 120 | Mya | Early Cretaceous | Chortis Block subduction into southwestern Mexico stops | cf (Note: Event recorded by 'a well-dated, 120 Ma-old subduction complex along the northern edge of the Chortis block presently exposed on the southern margin of the Motagua valley of Guatemala' (Bundschuh & Alvarado 2012, p. 212). Dated to Late Cretaceous by Gómez-Pompa et al. 2003, pp. 32–33.) |
| 65 | 65 | Mya | Palaeocene | Chicxulub impact | cf |
| 49 | 49 | Mya | Eocene | Cayman Trough rifting starts | cf |
| 26 | 20 | Mya | Oligocene–Miocene | Cayman Trough rifting slows down | cf |
| 23 | 22 | Mya | Miocene | Farallon Plate rifting starts | cf |
| 22 | 22 | Mya | Miocene | Cocos Plate subduction into Chortis Block starts | inc. end of eastwards migration of Chortis Block; inc. possible uplift of Chortis Block; inc. formation of Bay of Honduras ie initial linking of northern and southern portions of the Maya Region; cf |

=== Morphology ===
==== Provinces ====
The Maya Region is thought to fully or partially encompass at least fourteen geologic provinces. (Note: Alternative divisions of the Maya Region into geologic provinces have been offered, for instance, by Bundschuh & Alvarado 2012, p. 77, fig. 3.1.)

Geologic provinces within the Maya Region per 21st century literature. (Note: USGS No. is the unique USGS province number as per French & Schenk 2004 and French & Schenk 2006.)
| USGS No. | Name | Location | Notes |
|---|---|---|---|
| 5308 | Yucatan Platform | northern Lowlands | – |
| 6117 | Greater Antilles Deformed Belt | offshore Lowlands | – |
| 6120 | Cayman Trough | southern Lowlands | – |
| 6125 | Maya Mountains | central Lowlands | – |
| 5305 | Villahermosa Uplift | western Lowlands | – |
| 5306 | Macuspana Basin | western Lowlands | – |
| 5304 | Saline–Comalcalco Basin | western Lowlands | – |
| 5302 | Veracruz Basin | western Lowlands | – |
| 5303 | Tuxla Uplift | western Lowlands | – |
| 5311 | Chiapas Massif | western Lowlands | – |
| 5310 | Sierra Madre de Chiapas–Peten Foldbelt | southern Lowlands, northern Highlands | – |
| 6088 | Pacific Offshore Basin | Pacific | – |
| 6122 | Chiapas Massif–Nuclear Central America | Highlands | – |
| 6087 | Choco Pacific Basin | Highlands | – |

==== Basins ====
The Maya Region is believed to fully or partially comprehend at least five sedimentary basins.

Sedimentary basins within the Maya Region per 21st century literature. (Note: Evenick ID is the unique basin identifier ie UBI as per Evenick 2021, app. A supp. no. 1. The Evenick ID for the Limon–Bocas del Toro Basin is not given in Evenick 2021, app. A supp. no. 1, though falls within 353–365, inclusive, given the alphabetical assignment of identifiers used therein.)
| Evenick ID | Name | Location | Notes |
|---|---|---|---|
| 119 | Campeche | northern Lowlands | – |
| 519 | Peten–Corozal | central Lowlands | – |
| 757 | Yucatan | northern Lowlands | – |
| 647 | Sureste | western Lowlands | – |
| – | Limon–Bocas del Toro | Pacific, southern Highlands | – |

=== Tectonics ===
The majority of the Maya Region sits on the Maya Block of the North American Plate, though its southernmost extremes extend beyond this crustal fragment into the neighbouring Chortis Block of the Caribbean Plate. (Note: Additionally, a northeastern portion of the Maya Region, in the Isthmus of Tehuantepec, might extend beyond the Maya Block into the neighbouring Oaxaquia Block ie the Juarez, Cuicateco, or Oaxaquia Block, Terrane, or microcontinent (Ross et al. 2021, p. 243, fig. 1).) The Region notably houses the active Motagua–Polochic Fault Zone in the south, part of the Central American Volcanic Front in the southwest, and further borders the Eastern Mexican Transform to the west. (Note: It further borders the Salina Cruz Fault to the west, and further houses the Rio Hondo Faults in the east (Bundschuh & Alvarado 2012, pp. 278, 280–281, Gómez-Pompa et al. 2003, p. 32).)

=== Stratigraphy ===
The Maya Region's pre-Mesozoic crystalline basement is only exposed in the Mixtequita or Guichicovi Complex, the Chiapas Massif, the Altos Cuchumatanes, the Maya Mountains, and along the Chicxulub impact crater. It is elsewhere blanketed by extensive Mesozoic sedimentary cover.

== Notes and references ==
=== Full citations ===
==== Print ====
1. Adams, Richard E. W.; Macleod, Murdo J., eds. (2000a). Mesoamerica, Part 1. The Cambridge history of the native peoples of the Americas. Vol. 2. Cambridge: Cambridge University Press. doi:10.1017/CHOL9780521351652. ISBN 978-1-139-05377-8. S2CID 163512332.
2. Adams, Richard E. W.; Macleod, Murdo J., eds. (2000b). Mesoamerica, Part 2. The Cambridge history of the native peoples of the Americas. Vol. 2. Cambridge: Cambridge University Press. doi:10.1017/CHOL9780521652049. ISBN 978-1-139-05346-4.
3. Braswell, Geoffrey E., ed. (2022). 3,000 Years of War and Peace in the Maya Lowlands: Identity, Politics, and Violence. Routledge archaeology of the ancient Americas. London: Routledge. doi:10.4324/9781351268004. ISBN 978-1-351-26800-4. S2CID 246542762.
4. Bundschuh, Jochen; Alvarado, Guillermo E., eds. (2012) [2007]. Central America: Geology, Resources and Hazards (Reprint of 1st ed.). London: Taylor & Francis. doi:10.1201/9780203947043. ISBN 978-0-429-07437-0. OCLC 905983675.
5. Carrasco, Davíd, ed. (2006) [2001]. The Oxford Encyclopedia of Mesoamerican Cultures: The Civilisations of Mexico and Central America (Online reprint of 1st print ed.). Oxford: Oxford University Press. doi:10.1093/acref/9780195108156.001.0001. ISBN 978-0-19-518843-1.
6. Coe, Michael D.; Houston, Stephen D. (2015) [1966]. The Maya (9th ed.). New York: Thames & Hudson. OCLC 915597000.
7. Demarest, Arthur A., ed. (2007) [2004]. Ancient Maya: The rise and fall of a rainforest civilization. Case Studies in Early Societies (Reprint of 1st ed.). Cambridge: Cambridge University Press. OCLC 717693582. OL 3440009M.
8. Ford, Anabel; Nigh, Ronald (2015). The Maya forest garden: eight millennia of sustainable cultivation of the tropical woodlands. New frontiers in historical ecology. Vol. 6. Walnut Creek, CA: Left Coast Press. ISBN 978-1-61132-997-1. OCLC 894750131.
9. Gómez-Pompa, Arturo; Allen, Michael F.; Fedick, Scott L.; Jiménez-Osornio, Juan J., eds. (2003). The Lowland Maya Area: Three Millennia at the Human-Wildland Interface. Binghamton, NY: Food Products Press. ISBN 1-56022-970-5. OCLC 50725221.
10. Houk, Brett A., ed. (2019). Approaches to Monumental Landscapes of the Ancient Maya: A Legacy of Human Occupation. Gainesville, FL: University Press of Florida. ISBN 978-0-8130-5734-7. OCLC 1137019195.
11. Hutson, Scott R.; Ardren, Traci, eds. (2020). The Maya World. Routledge worlds. London: Routledge. doi:10.4324/9781351029582. ISBN 978-1-351-02958-2.
12. Nichols, Deborah L.; Pool, Christopher A., eds. (2012). The Oxford Handbook of Mesoamerican Archaeology. Oxford Handbooks (1st ed.). Oxford: Oxford University Press. ISBN 978-0-19-539093-3. OCLC 1109248998.
13. Sharer, Robert J.; Traxler, Loa P., eds. (2006) [1946]. The Ancient Maya (6th ed.). Stanford, Calif.: Stanford University Press. hdl:2027/mdp.39015062626216. ISBN 978-0-8047-4817-9. OCLC 57577446.

==== Journals ====
1. Bhattacharya, Tripti; Krause, Samantha; Penny, Dan; Wahl, David (27 September 2022). "Progress report: Drought and water management in ancient Maya society". Progress in Physical Geography: 1–16. doi:10.1177/03091333221129784. S2CID 252583845.
2. Coe, William R. (January 1955). "Early Man in the Maya Area". American Antiquity. 20 (3): 271–273. doi:10.2307/277005. JSTOR 277005.
3. Creamer, Winifred (1987). "Mesoamerica as a Concept: An Archaeological View from Central America". Latin American Research Review. 22 (1): 35–62. doi:10.1017/S0023879100016423. JSTOR 2503542. S2CID 131671104.
4. Evenick, J. C. (2021). "Glimpses into Earth's history using a revised global sedimentary basin map". Earth-Science Reviews. article no. 103564. 215 (sn) 103564. Bibcode:2021ESRv..21503564E. doi:10.1016/j.earscirev.2021.103564. S2CID 233950439.
5. Franco-Gaviria, Felipe; Caballero-Rodríguez, Dayenari; Correa-Metrio, Alexander; Pérez, Liseth; Schwalb, Antje; Cohuo, Sergio; Macario-González, Laura (April 2018). "The human impact imprint on modern pollen spectra of the Maya lands". Boletín de la Sociedad Geológica Mexicana. 70 (1): 61–78. Bibcode:2018BSGMx..70...61F. doi:10.18268/bsgm2018v70n1a4.
6. Glover, Jeffrey B.; Rissolo, Dominique; Beddows, Patricia A.; Jaijel, Roy; Smith, Derek; Goodman-Tchernov, Beverly (9 June 2022). "The Proyecto Costa Escondida: Historical ecology and the study of past coastal landscapes in the Maya area". The Journal of Island and Coastal Archaeology. 19 (3): 505–524. doi:10.1080/15564894.2022.2061652.
7. Gunn, Joel D.; Matheny, Ray T.; Folan, William J. (14 August 2002). "Climate-change Studies in the Maya Area: A diachronic analysis". Ancient Mesoamerica. 13 (1): 79–84. doi:10.1017/S0956536102131105. S2CID 29468376.
8. Hartlett, Harley Harris (January 1932). "A Biological Survey of the Maya Area". Bulletin of the Torrey Botanical Club. 59 (1): 7–20. doi:10.2307/2480459. JSTOR 2480459.
9. Hodell, David A.; Quinn, Rhonda L.; Brenner, Mark; Kamenov, George (May 2004). "Spatial variation of strontium isotopes (87Sr/86Sr) in the Maya region: a tool for tracking ancient human migration". Journal of Archaeological Science. 31 (5): 585–601. Bibcode:2004JArSc..31..585H. doi:10.1016/j.jas.2003.10.009.
10. Kennett, Douglas J.; Lipson, Mark; Prufer, Keith M.; Mora-Marín, David; George, Richard J.; Rohland, Nadin Rohland; Robinson, Mark; Trask, Willa R.; Edgar, Heather H. J.; Hill, Ethan C.; Ray, Erin E.; Lynch, Paige; Moes, Emily; O'Donnell, Lexi; Harper, Thomas K.; Kate, Emily J.; Ramos, Josue; Morris, John; Gutierrez, Said M.; Ryan, Timothy M.; Culleton, Brendan J.; Awe, Jaime J.; Reich, David (22 March 2022). "South-to-north migration preceded the advent of intensive farming in the Maya region". Nature Communications. 13 (1): 1–10 of article no. 1530. Bibcode:2022NatCo..13.1530K. doi:10.1038/s41467-022-29158-y. PMC 8940966. PMID 35318319. S2CID 247617021.
11. Kuil, Linda; Carr, Gemma; Prskawetz, Alexia; Salinas, José Luis; Viglione, Alberto; Blöschl, Günter (March 2019). "Learning from the Ancient Maya: Exploring the Impact of Drought on Population Dynamics". Ecological Economics. 157: 1–16. Bibcode:2019EcoEc.157....1K. doi:10.1016/j.ecolecon.2018.10.018. hdl:11583/2767853. S2CID 53700665.
12. Lohse, Jon C.; Morgan, Molly; Jones, John G.; Brenner, Mark; Curtis, Jason; Hamilton, W. Derek; Cardona, Karla (10 August 2022). "Early Maize in the Maya Area". Latin American Antiquity. 33 (4): 1–16 of FirstView articles. doi:10.1017/laq.2022.55. S2CID 251506698.
13. Nooren, Kees; Hoek, Wim Z.; Dermody, Brian J.; Galop, Didier; Metcalfe, Sarah; Islebe, Gerald; Middelkoop, Hans (20 August 2018). "Climate impact on the development of Pre-Classic Maya civilisation". Climate of the Past. 14 (8): 1253–1273. Bibcode:2018CliPa..14.1253N. doi:10.5194/cp-14-1253-2018. S2CID 55370409.
14. Ross, C. H.; Stockli, D. F.; Rasmussen, C.; Gulick, S. P. S.; Graaff, S. J.; Claeys, P.; Zhao, J. (2021). "Evidence of Carboniferous arc magmatism preserved in the Chicxulub impact structure". Geological Society of America Bulletin. 134 (1–2): 241–260. doi:10.1130/B35831.1. hdl:10044/1/99016. S2CID 238043996.
15. Sharpe, Ashley E.; Emery, Kitty F.; Inomata, Takeshi; Krigbaum, John (19 March 2018). "Earliest isotopic evidence in the Maya region for animal management and long-distance trade at the site of Ceibal, Guatemala". Proceedings of the National Academy of Sciences. 115 (14): 3605–3610. Bibcode:2018PNAS..115.3605S. doi:10.1073/pnas.1713880115. PMC 5889628. PMID 29555750.
16. Sharpe, Ashley E.; Kamenov, George D.; Gilli, Adrian; Hodell, David L.; Emery, Kitty F.; Brenner, Mark; Krigbaum, John (2 November 2016). "Lead (Pb) Isotope Baselines for Studies of Ancient Human Migration and Trade in the Maya Region". PLOS ONE. 11 (11): 1–28 of article no. e0164871. Bibcode:2016PLoSO..1164871S. doi:10.1371/journal.pone.0164871. PMC 5091867. PMID 27806065.
17. Scherer, Andrew K.; de Carteret, Alyce; Newman, Sarah (June 2015). "Local water resource variability and oxygen isotopic reconstructions of mobility: A case study from the Maya area". Journal of Archaeological Science: Reports. 2: 666–676. Bibcode:2015JArSR...2..666S. doi:10.1016/j.jasrep.2014.11.006.
18. Thornton, Ern Kennedy; Emery, Kitty F.; Steadman, David W.; Speller, Camilla; Matheny, Ray; Yang, Dongya (8 August 2012). "Earliest Mexican turkeys (Meleagris gallopavo) in the Maya region; implications for pre-Hispanic animal trade and the timing of turkey domestication". PLOS ONE. 7 (8): 1–8 of article no. e42630. Bibcode:2012PLoSO...742630T. doi:10.1371/journal.pone.0042630. PMC 3414452. PMID 22905156.
19. Wrobel, Gabriel D.; Hoggarth, Julie A.; Marshall, Aubree (14 December 2021). "Before the Maya: A Review of Paleoindian and Archaic Human Skeletons Found in the Maya Region". Ancient Mesoamerica. 32 (3): 475–485. doi:10.1017/S0956536121000250. S2CID 245125288.

==== Theses ====
1. Duarte, Edward Fernando (2022). Hydroclimate variability in Central America during the Holocene inferred from lacustrine sediments in Lake Izabal, eastern Guatemala (PhD Thesis). Missouri University of Science and Technology.
2. Harvey, William James (March 2019). The Central American Isthmus: ecological dynamics of the middle-late Holocene (DPhil Thesis). University of Oxford.
3. Martens, Uwe (2009). Geologic evolution of the Maya Block (southern edge of the North American plate): An example of terrane transferral and crustal recycling (PhD Thesis). Stanford University. ProQuest 304999167.

==== Other ====
1. Ahmad, S. S.; Escalona, A. (June 2014). "Paleogeographic Reconstruction of Northern Caribbean Region from Late Cretaceous to Recent". Conference Proceedings, 76th EAGE Conference and Exhibition 2014, Jun 2014, Volume 2014. European Association of Geoscientists and Engineers. pp. 1–3. doi:10.3997/2214-4609.20141659. hdl:11250/224374.
2. DTM (June 2013). Deep Time Maps North America Key Time Slices (Map). 1:1,000,000. Sedona, AZ: Colorado Plateau Geosystems. Archived from the original on 18 October 2022.
3. French, C. D.; Schenk, C. J. (2004). Map showing geology, oil and gas fields, and geologic provinces of the Caribbean Region (Map). 1:2,500,000. Open-File Report 97-470-K. Reston, Virg.: U.S. Geological Survey. doi:10.3133/ofr97470K.
4. French, C. D.; Schenk, C. J. (2006). Map showing geology, oil and gas fields, and geologic provinces of the Gulf of Mexico region (Map). 1:2,500,000. Open-File Report 97-470-L. Reston, Virg.: U.S. Geological Survey. doi:10.3133/ofr97470L.
5. Goldberg, Maren (17 January 2008). "Tajumulco Volcano". Britannica Academic. Chicago, Ill.: Encyclopædia Britannica. Britannica ID place/Tajumulco-Volcano.
