= Cayos Arcas =

Sand cays and reef system in the Gulf of Mexico

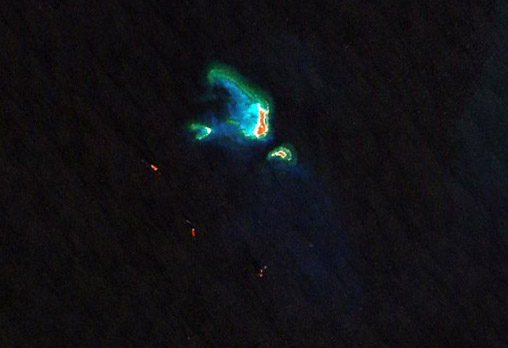
- Satellite image of Cayos Arcas

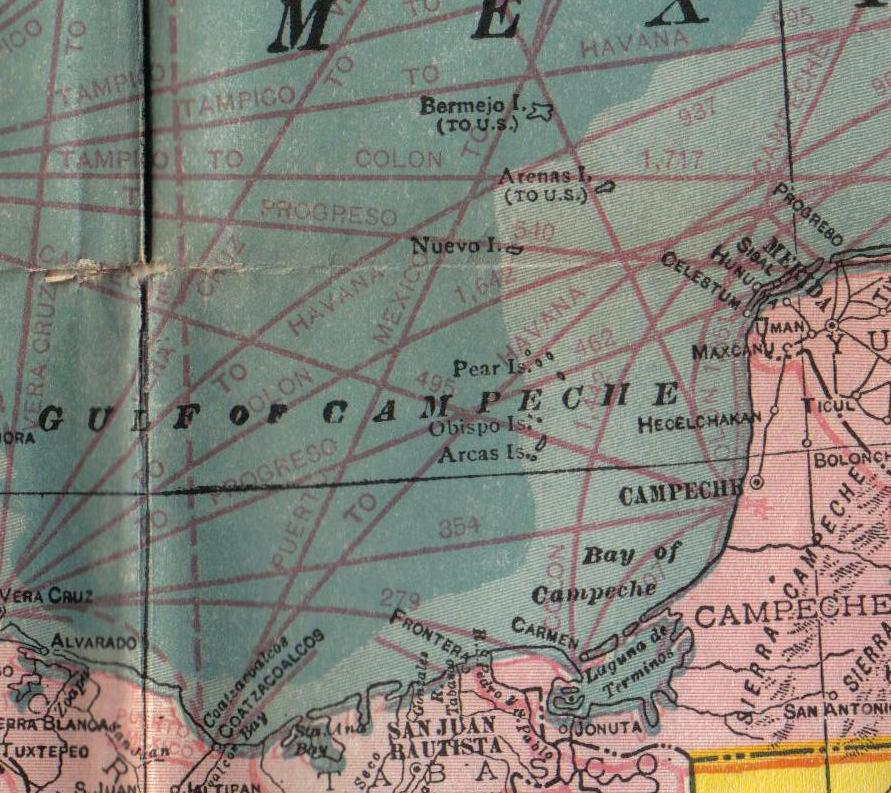
- Gulf of Campeche islands

- Location in Gulf of Mexico

Geography
- Location: Bay of Campeche
- Coordinates: 20.21°N 91.98°W
- Archipelago: Campeche Bank
- Adjacent to: Gulf of Mexico; Yucatán Channel
- Total islands: Nine
- Major islands: Arrecife Alacranes; Triangulo Oeste; Triangulo Este; Banco Obispo Norte; Banco Obispo Sur; Cayos Arcas; Banco Nuevo; Banco Pera

Administration
- Mexico
- Federal Entity of Mexico: Campeche
- Capital city: Campeche City

The Cayos Arcas is a chain of three tiny sand cays and an accompanying reef system in the Gulf of Mexico, 128 kilometres (80 miles) from the mainland. It is located approximately 130 kilometres (81 miles) from the mainland, west of Campeche. Their aggregate land area is 22.8 hectares (56.3 acres). They belong to the municipality of Campeche in the state of Campeche.

The main island is Cayo del Centro, with an area of 13.7 hectares (33.9 acres), which is scantily covered with grass. Bushes and several clumps of palms are also present. A pair of lighted range beacons stand on the cay. Cayo del Este, a cay 5.2 hectares (12.8 acres) large and 3 metres (9.8 feet) high, lies on a detached reef lying 0.5 kilometres (0.3 miles) southeast of Cayo del Centro. Cayo del Oeste, a cay 3.9 hectares (9.6 acres) in area and 2 metres (6.6 feet) high, lies on a small detached reef about 1.4 kilometres (0.9 miles) west of the south end of Cayo del Centro.

The chain is uninhabited, and lacks structures except for the beacons on Cayo del Centro. Vegetation on the islands is sparse, consisting of sand shrubs and grasses. It currently serves as a navigational marker. Cayos Arcas Terminal, an extensive chain of petroleum stations on the Arcas' reef system is located to the south of the islands. The Arcas oil rigs are currently among the largest oil producers in the gulf in terms of output.

== Geography ==
Cayo del Centro, the largest of the three islands, is 0.137 square kilometres (0.053 square miles) in total, with about 0.1 square kilometres (0.0 square miles) of permanently unsubmerged land. On the island, viewed through Google Maps, along with a covering of Palythoa caribaeorum, Zoanthus sociatus, Acropora palmata, Montastraea annularis, and Diploria strigosa, appear to be a few small buildings and small signs of past human habitation. The island has at least 6 sandy Tidal islands, none of which seem to exceed 1,000 square metres (10,764 square feet) or have any vegetation on them.

Cayo del Este is to the east of Cayo del Centro. This island appears to have 2 species of plant on it, and a single nearby islet about 20 metres (66 feet) long and 8 metres (26 feet) wide. To the west, the island has a fairly long spit of sand leading to a sort of tidal lagoon.

Cayo del Oeste, the smallest the main islands, is further from the other two, and is mainly a triangular islet connected to a spit of sand, with a very small amount of vegetation at the center. The island, although having no nearby islets/sandbars, does have a shallow strip of coast going southwest from its eastern edge. it also has a shipwreck on its eastern coast visible from google maps, It seems to have beached on its side, the ship's name is unknown.

About a third of the way between Cayo del Centro and Cayo del Oeste is a shoal and small island 16 metres (52 feet) long and only 5 metres (16 feet) wide. The island, although small, has a fairly large surrounding shallows, which nearby boats should be wary of. Further to the north of this island is another shallow reef that, although not breaking the surface, is about 230 feet (70 metres) wide and less than 20-foot (6.1-metre) deep. Some of the group, most notably a 3-kilometre-long (1.9-mile) cay on the North/Northeast part of the shoal, is surrounded by a very shallow, dangerous reef. The only safe entrances by boat to the islands are to the North-West-West, South-South-West, and West for the central, east, and west islands respectively. The islands are likely formed by coral growth around an extinct volcano caldera.

== Maritime History of Campeche Bank ==
In the 19th century, the Arcas ocean bank was often used for military operations in the Gulf of Mexico. In 1843, a Texas naval flotilla from the Republic of Texas briefly occupied the island during the Caste War of Yucatán and Naval Battle of Campeche. During the American Civil War, the famous Confederate raider CSS Alabama used the remote chain as a rendezvous point to be resupplied while conducting operations in the gulf.
