= Isla Pérez =

Mexican island in the Gulf of Mexico

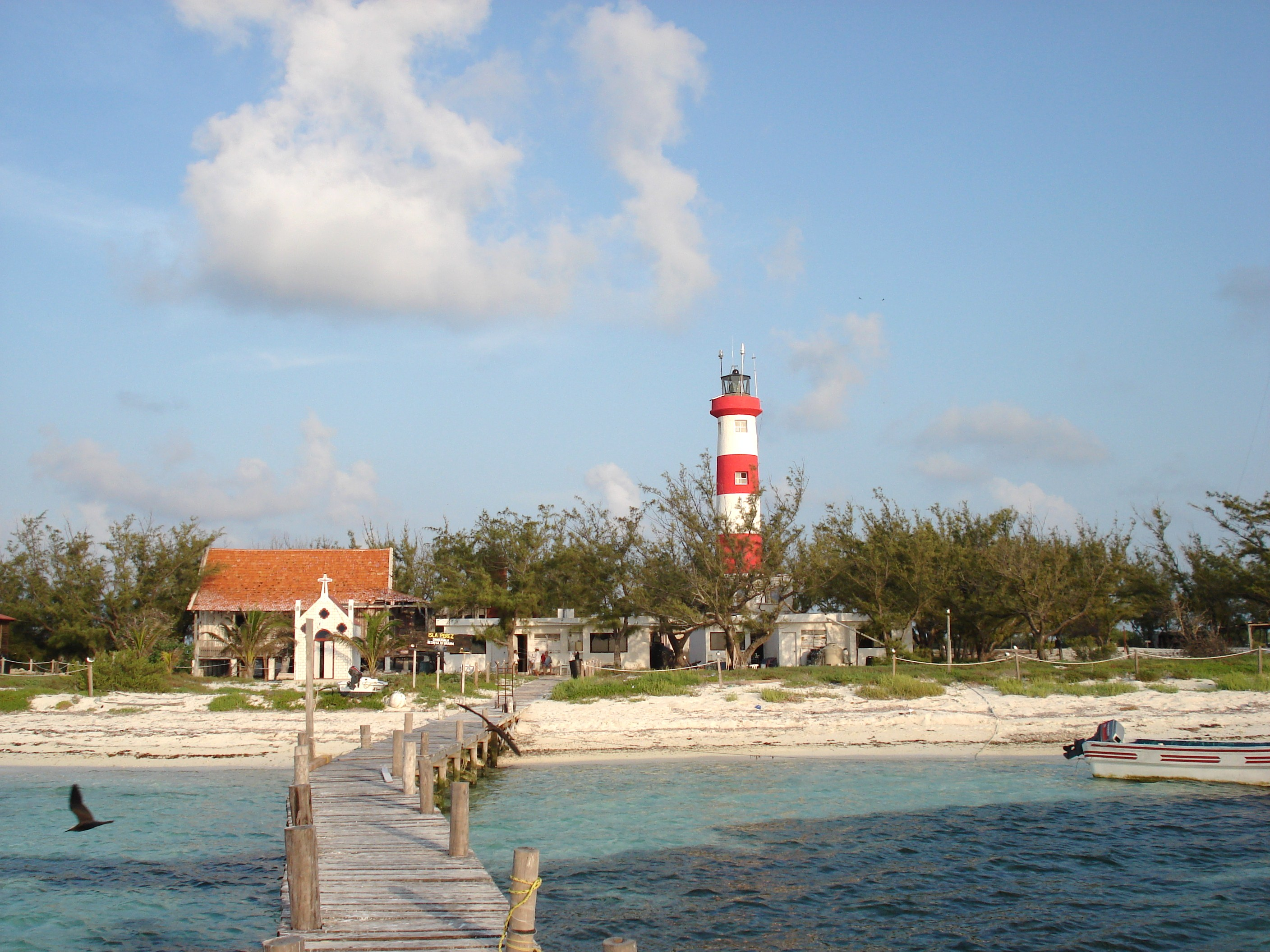
- Entrance to the small port on Isla Pérez

- Location within Mexico

Geography
- Location: Gulf of Mexico
- Coordinates: 22°23′40″N 89°42′00″W
- Archipelago: Scorpion Reef

Administration
- Mexico

Isla Pérez is an island located in the Gulf of Mexico, 130 km (80.7 mi) north of Progreso, Mexico, off the coast of the Yucatán Peninsula. It belongs to the Arrecife Alacranes National Park, and is the largest island in the archipelago.

The waters and coral reefs surrounding the island provide an important refuge for sea life and attract many fishermen to the region. The island has little vegetation, with a hot and dry climate that is not hospitable to human life.

Historically, the island has been used as a navigation reference point in the southern Gulf of Mexico, particularly for mariners between the Yucatán Channel and Bay of Campeche. Because of its importance to navigation, the Mexican Navy has stationed a small detachment there.

== See also ==
- List of reefs
- Scorpion Reef
