= Campeche Bank =

Ocean bank of the Gulf of Mexico

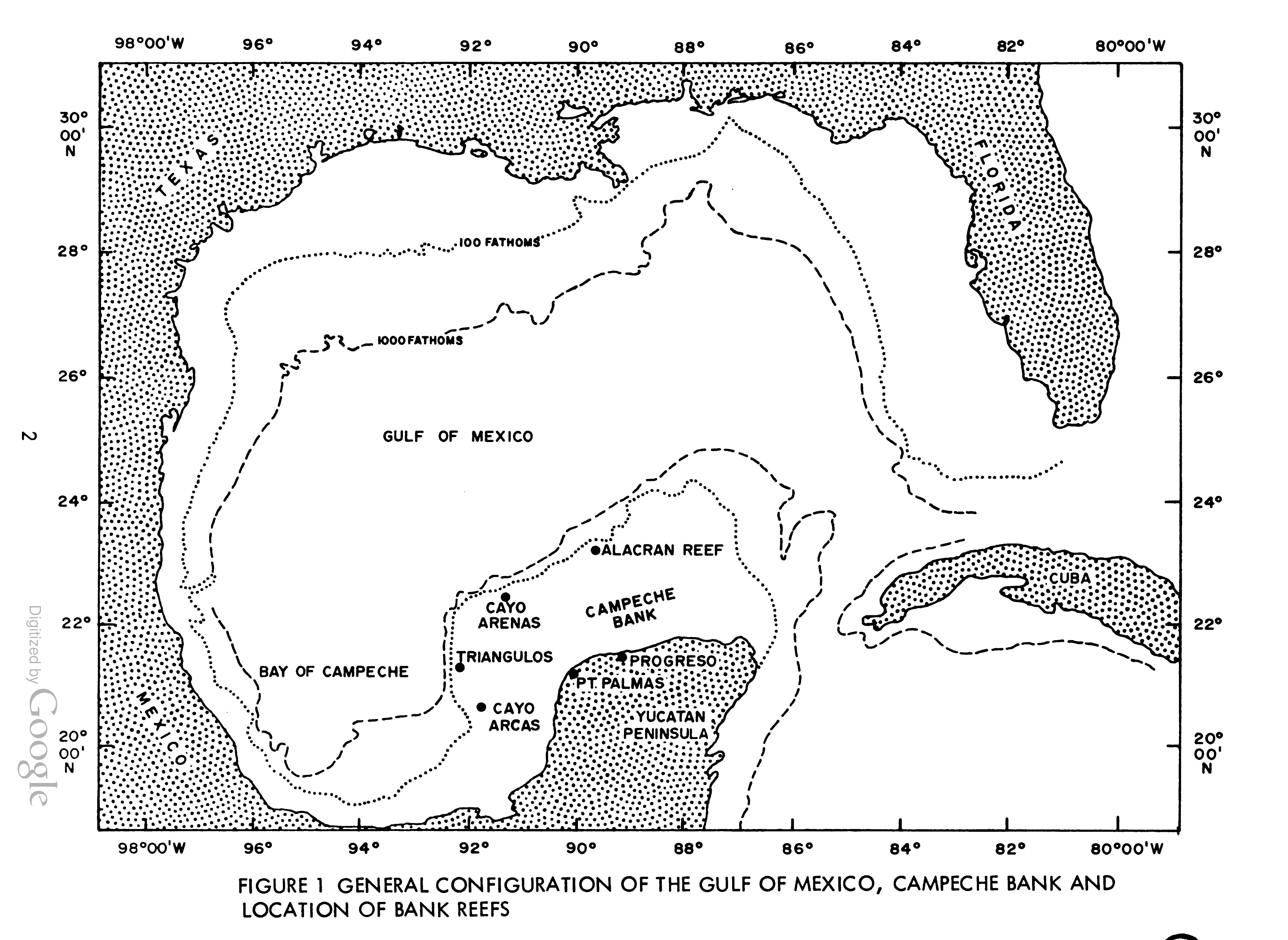
- 1965 realization of Campeche Bank

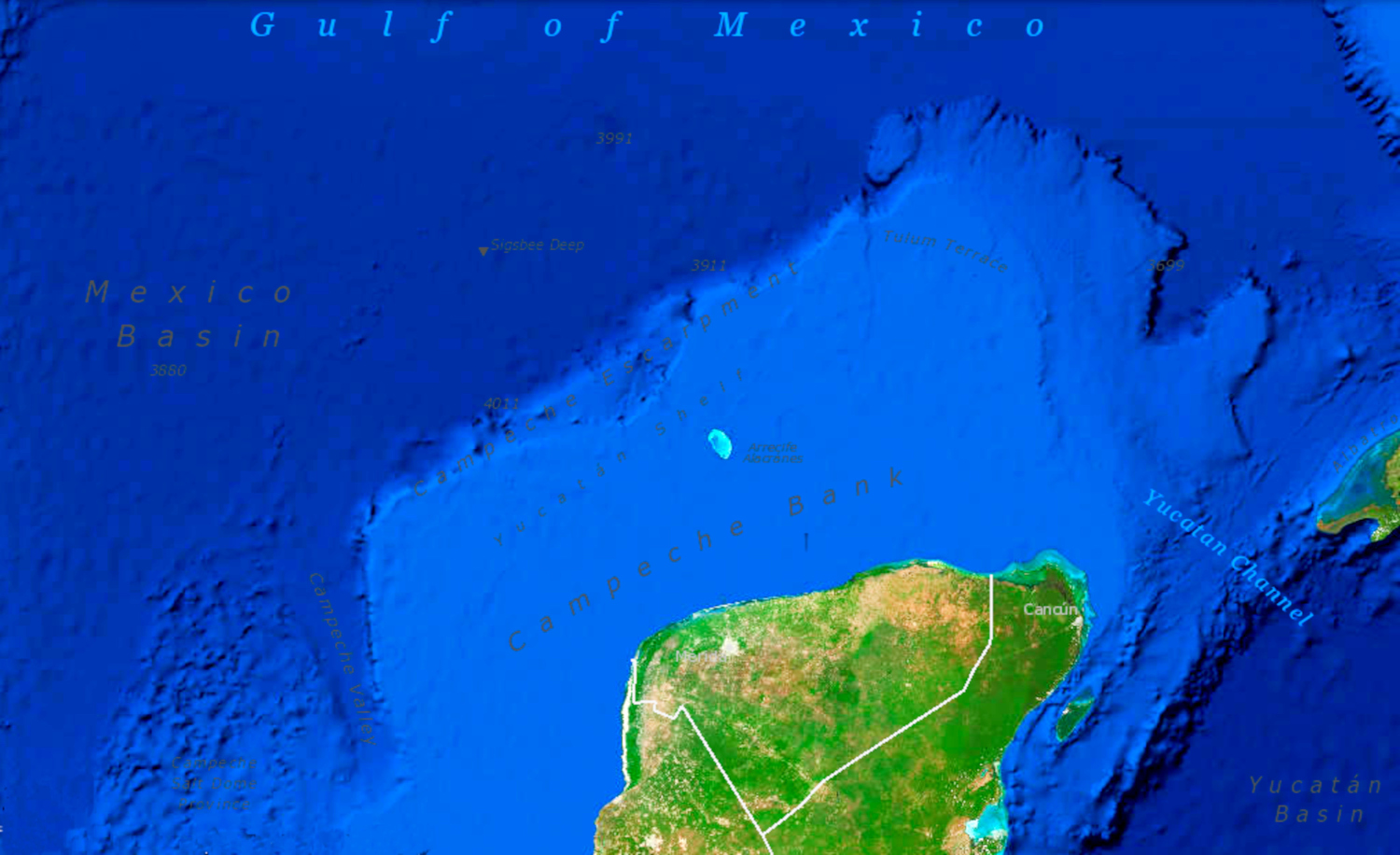
- Depiction of Campeche Bank & Yucatán Shelf

- Location in Gulf of Mexico

Geography
- Location: Bay of Campeche; Yucatán Platform
- Coordinates: 22°30′N 89°0′W
- Archipelago: Campeche Bank
- Adjacent to: Gulf of Mexico; Yucatán Channel
- Total islands: Ten
- Major islands: Arrecife Alacranes; Cayo Arenas; Triángulo Sur; Triángulo Oeste; Triángulo Este; Banco Obispo Norte; Banco Obispo Sur; Cayos Arcas; Banco Nuevo; Banco Pera

Administration
- Mexico
- Federal Entity of Mexico: Campeche
- Capital city: Campeche City

Additional information
- Campeche Knolls

Campeche Bank is part of the Gulf of Mexico and extends from the Yucatan Straits in the east to the Tabasco-Campeche Basin in the west. The Campeche ocean bank is 81 miles (130 km) from Mexico's geography of Campeche nautically bearing 100 nautical miles (120 mi; 190 km) south of the Tropic of Cancer.

Campeche Bank is cast as cays and reefs with islets encompassing Arrecife Alacran and Sigsbee Deep to the north with a southwest island arc of the Cayos Arcas archipelago isolated 92 nautical miles (106 mi; 170 km) north of Ciudad del Carmen.
