= Yucatán Platform =

Yucatán Peninsula and its continental shelf

Yucatán Platform Yucatán Shelf
- Platform
- Extent of the Yucatan Platform / in 2006 map by French & Schenk / via USGS, Esri, Natural Earth

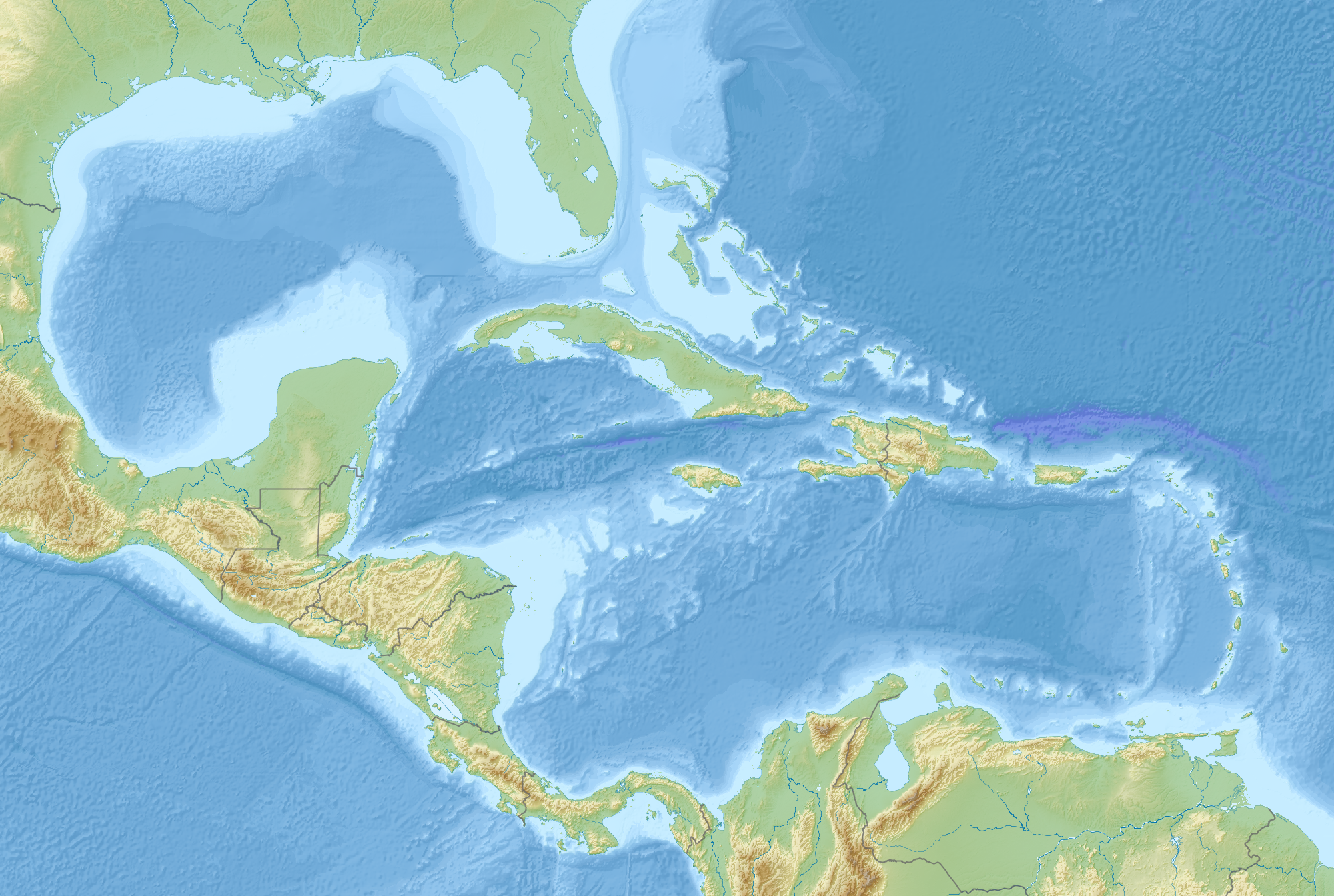
- Location within Middle America
- Coordinates: 20.445647°N 89.588987°W
- Location: Belize, northern Guatemala, southeastern Mexico
- Part of: Maya Block
- Geology: geologic or physiographic province; continental platform; carbonate platform

Area
  - Total: 163,730 mi^{2} (424,100 km^{2})

Dimensions
  - Length: 563 mi (906 km)
  - Width: 381 mi (613 km)
- USGS geologic province number: 5308

The Yucatán Platform or Yucatán Shelf is a geologic or physiographic province, and a continental and carbonate platform, in the Maya Block of the southernmost portion of the North American Plate. It comprises the Yucatán Peninsula and its continental shelf, located between the Gulf of Mexico and the Caribbean Sea. (Note: The terms Yucatán Platform and Yucatán Shelf are sometimes used as a synonyms for the Yucatán Peninsula, i.e., the exposed portion of the Yucatán Platform (e.g., in Nairn & Stehli 1975, pp. 257–258 and Bundschuh & Alvarado 2012, p. 77, fig. 3.1). This article does not employ said usage.)

== Extent ==
The Yucatán Platform is commonly defined as the continental platform constituted by the Yucatán Peninsula and its continental shelf. As such, the margins of the continental shelf, or, more particularly, their 650 feet (200 m) isobaths or depth contours, are often taken as the platform's submarine limits. Its subaerial limits (on the Yucatán Peninsula) are less precisely fixed.

The US Geological Survey have demarcated the limits of the Yucatán Platform. Their British, Belizean, and Mexican counterparts have not defined an equivalent geologic, physiographic, or geomorphic province or region.

== Geography ==
=== Political ===
The exposed or peninsular portion of the Yucatán Platform encompasses four districts of Belize (i.e., Corozal, Orange Walk, Belize, and Cayo), one department of Guatemala (i.e., Peten), and four states of Mexico (i.e., Quintana Roo, Yucatán, Campeche, and Tabasco). Its submarine portion encompasses the continental shelf which abuts those of the aforementioned districts with a coast.

=== Basins ===
At least three sedimentary basins have been identified in the Yucatán Platform, namely, the Campeche, Yucatán, and Peten‍–‍Corozal.

=== Faults ===
At least six fault systems or zones have been identified in the Yucatán Platform, namely, the Holbox, Hondo, Ticul, Ring of Cenotes, Chemax‍–‍Catoche, and La Libertad, with the first four of these considered prominent.

== Geology ==
Terrestrial rocks of the Yucatan Platform / in 2006 map by French & Schenk / via USGS, Esri, Natural Earth

=== Formation ===
The Gulf of Mexico formed during a 70‍–‍90 million year rifting of Pangaea, which began some 240 million years ago, during the Middle Triassic, and ended some 170‍–‍150 million years ago, during the Middle or Late Jurassic. The subaerially exposed (i.e., peninsular) portion of the platform is thought to have been fully submarine up to some 30‍–‍10 million years ago.

=== Layers ===
==== Basement ====
The platform's crystalline basement is composed mainly of Precambrian to Palaeozoic granodiorite rocks. It starts at a depth of some 2.3 miles (3.7 km) in the centre-point of the platform's exposed or peninsular portion, but steeps down towards the platform's eastern and northwestern extremes, starting at a depth of 3.4–3.7 miles (5.5–6.0 km) in the latter point.

==== Cover ====
The platform's sedimentary cover is composed mainly of carbonates and evaporites formed during or after the Early Cretaceous. It forms one of the largest deposits of carbonate minerals on Earth, with a depth range of 2.3–3.7 miles (3.7–6.0 km) .
