= Scorpion Reef =

Mexican reef in the Gulf of Mexico

Native name: Arrecife Alacranes
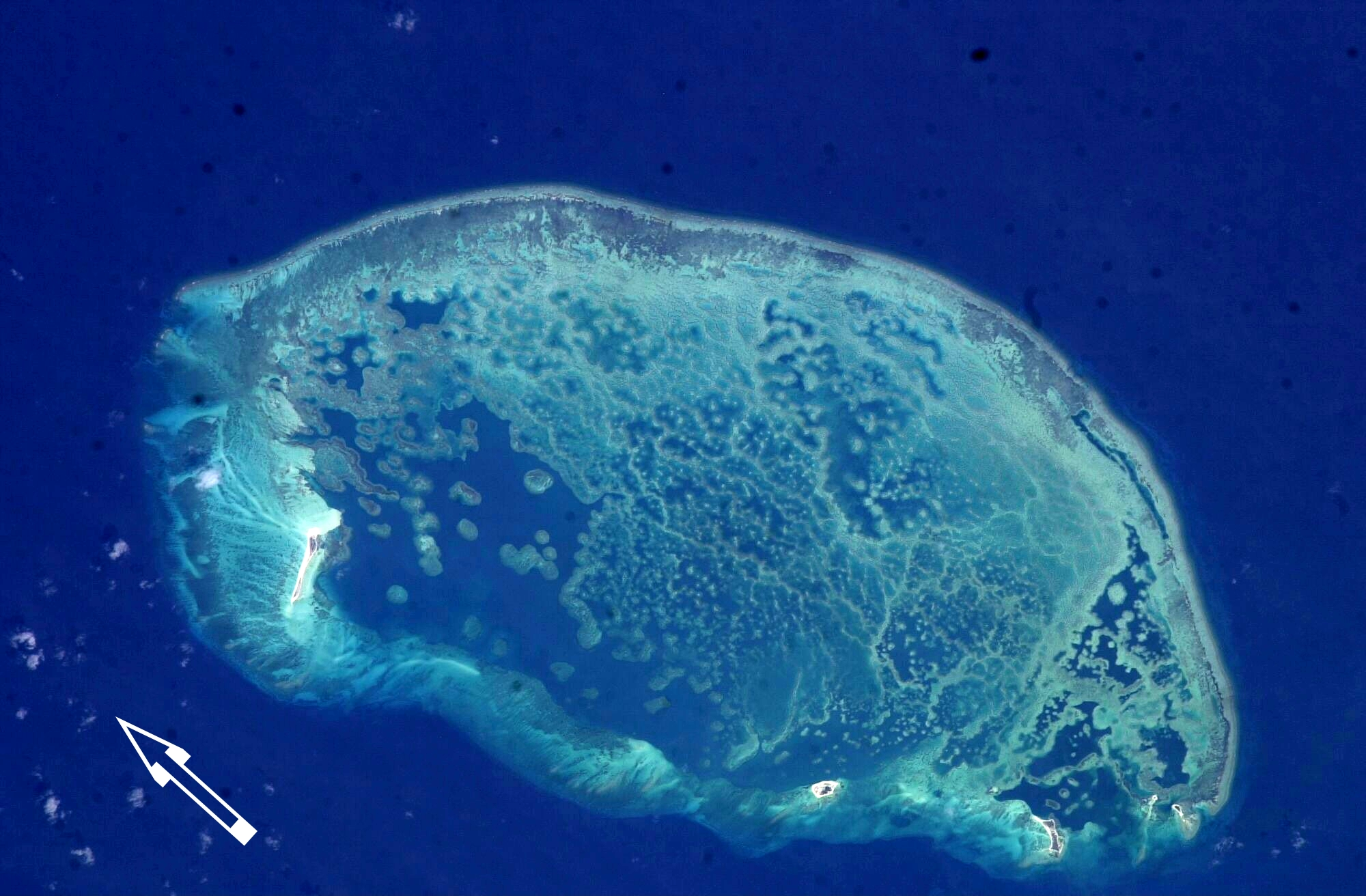
- ISS image of Scorpion Reef

- Location within Mexico

Geography
- Location: Gulf of Mexico; Progreso Municipality; Yucatán, Mexico
- Coordinates: 22°22′58″N 89°40′57.8″W
- Archipelago: Campeche Bank
- Total islands: 5
- Major islands: Isla Pérez

Administration
- Mexico

Ramsar Wetland
- Official name: Parque Nacional Arrecife Alacranes
- Designated: 2 February 2008
- Reference no.: 1820

Scorpion Reef (Spanish: Arrecife Alacranes) is an atoll containing a small group of islets in the Gulf of Mexico, about 125 kilometres (78 mi; 67 NM) off the northern coast of the state of Yucatán, Mexico. Designated a national park, the reef is part of the Campeche Bank archipelago and is the largest reef in the southern Gulf of Mexico. It contains five main vegetated islands: Isla Pérez, Isla Desertora, Isla Pájaros, Isla Chica, and Isla Desterrada. Isla Pérez is the only inhabited island and includes a lighthouse. The reef, including its islets and surrounding waters, has been recognised as an Important Bird Area by BirdLife International because it supports a population of magnificent frigatebirds.

== History ==
The British postal steamer Tweed was wrecked on the reef en route from Havana to Veracruz in 1847, with the loss of 72 lives and a cargo of mercury.

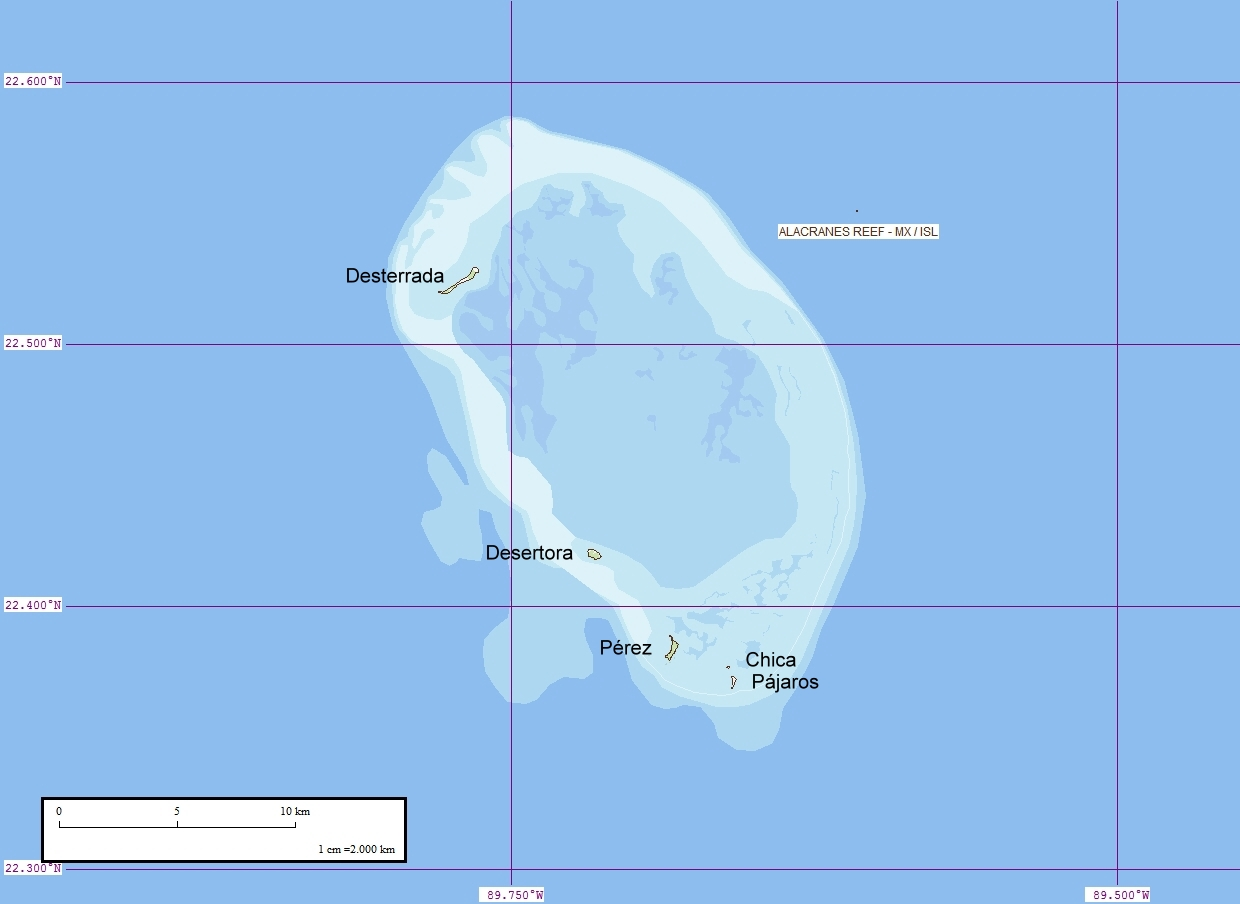
Map

== See also ==
- List of reefs
