= Tectonic block =

Solid unit of the Earth's crust

A tectonic block is a part of the Earth's crust that can be treated as a solid rigid crustal block or lithospheric section. A tectonic block may be bounded by faults. It may move from one place to another because of a tectonic shift, and they may also be rotated. A tectonic block may have a proper name for example, the Muness Phyllite Block (which is located in Unst and Uyea in Scotland), or the South China Block.

Early use of the term tectonic block referred to the blocks of rock on either side of a fault.

Continental regions may be subdivided into tectonic blocks which are mapped in order to determine earthquake risk.
