= Maya Block =

Tectonic block under the Yucatan Peninsula

Maya Block: Maya Terrane; Yucatan Block; Yucatan–Chiapas Block
- Tectonic block
- Maya Block / detail of 2006 map by French & Schenk / via USGS

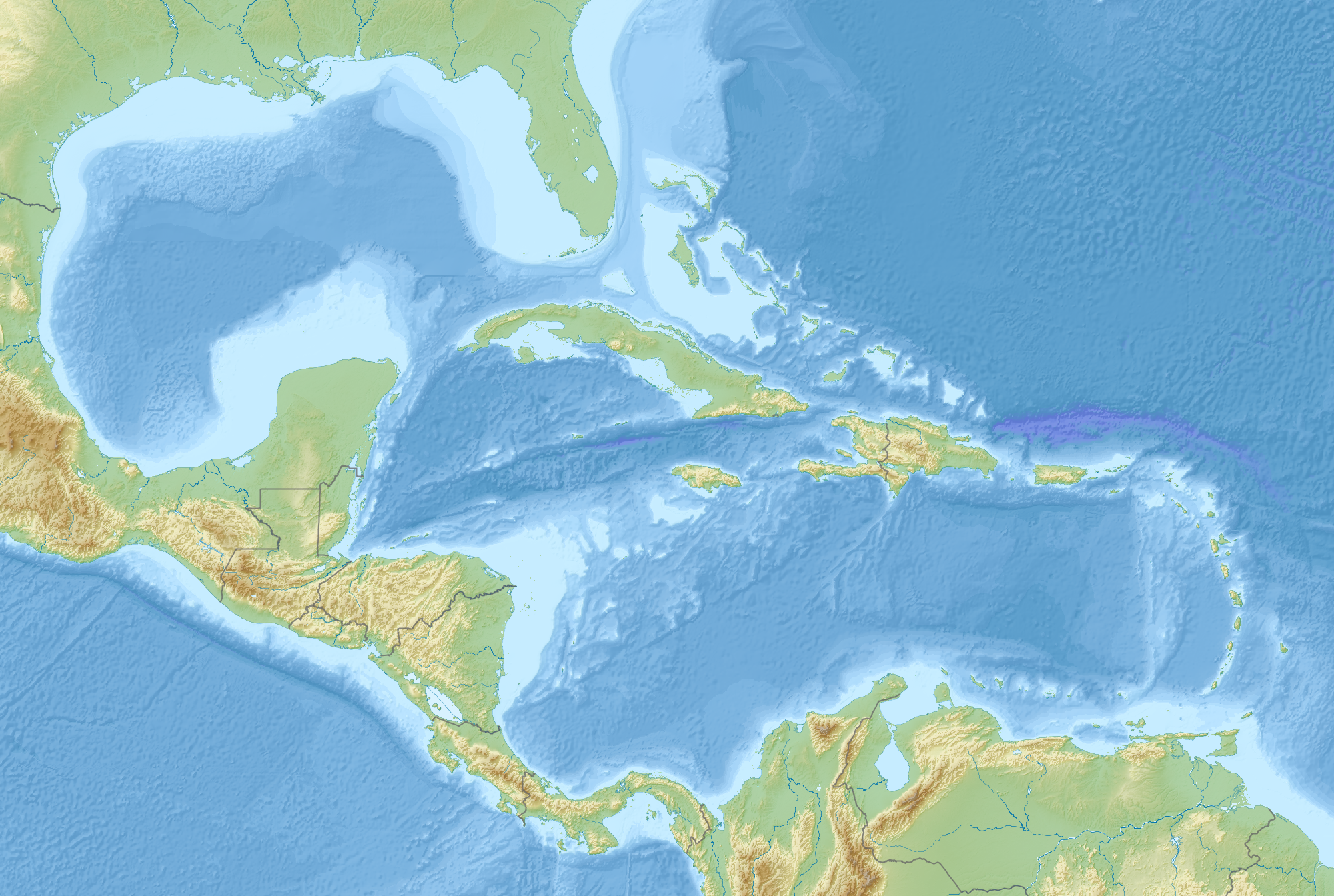
- Location within Middle America
- Coordinates: 20°N 89°W
- Location: Belize, northern Guatemala, southeastern Mexico^{1}
- Part of: North American Plate
- Geology: tectonic or crustal block

Area
  - Total: 233,130 mi^{2} (603,800 km^{2})^{1}

Dimensions
  - Length: 760 mi (1,220 km)^{1}
  - Width: 450 mi (720 km)^{1}
- ^{1} Data for most commonly accepted extension as per sec 'Extent' of this article.

The Maya Block, also known as the Maya Terrane, Yucatan Block, or Yucatan–Chiapas Block, is a physiographic or geomorphic region and tectonic or crustal block in the southernmost portion of the North American Plate.

== Extent ==
The Block is commonly delimited by the continental margin in the Gulf of Mexico to the north, in the Caribbean Sea to the east, and in the Pacific Ocean to the southwest, and further, by the Motagua–Polochic Faults to the south-southeast, and by the Isthmus of Tehuantepec to the west. The Motagua–Polochic Faults divide the Maya Block from the Chortis Block, while the Isthmus of Tehuantepec divides it from the Oaxaquia Block (i.e., the Juarez, Cuicateco, or Oaxaquia Block, Terrane, or microcontinent). (Note: The Maya Block was first defined as 'the area [of Central America ie of that land and continental shelf which extends from the Isthmus of Tehuantepec in Mexico to the Atrato lowland in Colombia] north of the Motagua fault zone [...] [ie] northern Guatemala, Belice [Belize], the states of Chiapas, Tabasco, Campeche, Yucatán and Quintana Roo in Mexico, and the Campeche Bank in the Gulf of Mexico' (Dengo 1969, p. 312).)

The Block's precise subaerial limits are not widely agreed upon, in contrast to its relatively exact submarine borders. (Note: Martens 2009, pp. 9–12, 37, 93 notes that, though some six faults are thought to constitute the Motagua–Polochic Faults, there is no widespread agreement on which exactly divides the Maya and Chortis Blocks. Additionally, the Maya–Oaxaquia boundary, in the broadly-demarcated Isthmus of Tehuantepec, is sometimes more precisely specified by coincident or adjacent faults, as in Ross et al. 2021, p. 243, fig. 1, Bundschuh & Alvarado 2012, pp. 278, 900, and Martens 2009, pp. 9–10. Faults in the Motagua–Polochic Faults include the Polochic or Chixoy–Polochic, Panima, Baja Verapaz, San Agustin, Cabañas or Cabañas–Jubuco or Motagua, and Jocotan–Chamelecon Faults (Martens 2009, pp. 9–11, Bundschuh & Alvarado 2012, pp. 328–329). Faults in or near the Isthmus of Tehuantepec include the Vista Hermosa Fault, the Salina Cruz Fault, and the East Mexican Transform (Ross et al. 2021, p. 243, fig. 1, Bundschuh & Alvarado 2012, pp. 278, 900, Martens 2009, p. 9).) Furthermore, it has been recently suggested that the Block's western extreme may rather extend past the Isthmus of Tehuantepec, along the Gulf of Mexico, and into Louisiana. (Note: Nonetheless, this article employs the Maya Block's more established western limit, ie the Isthmus of Tehuantepec.)

== Geography ==
=== Physical ===
==== Mountains ====
A broad arching fold belt of 'morphologically distinct mountain ranges separated by deep fault-controlled canyons and occasional broad alluvial valleys' extends along the south-southeasterly limit of the Block. The most prominent of said mountain ranges are the Northern Chiapas Mountains and the Sierra Madre de Chiapas in Mexico, the Cuchumatanes, Chama, Santa Cruz, and Lacandon Ranges in Guatemala, and the Maya Mountains in Belize.

==== Karstlands ====
The 'most extensive karstlands of the North American continent' extend northwards from the Block's southern extreme. The Block's most prominent karstic landform is the Yucatán Platform to its north. Relatively less prominent karstic formations occur in the Block's southern portion, including an unnamed formation in northwestern Peten to northeastern Belize, the Belize Barrier Reef, the Lacandon Range, the Cuchumatanes Range, and various formations to the north and south of the Maya Mountains. (Note: The Peten–Belize and the Barrier Reef kastlands are dolines or fluviokarsts, while the remaining southerly formations are cone or tower karsts (Bundschuh & Alvarado 2012, p. 157, fig. 5.1). The karstlands abutting the Maya Mountains are the Vaca Plateau and the Boundary ie Sibun–Manatee Faults to the north, and the Little Quartz Ridge ie K/T Fault Ridges to the south (Bundschuh & Alvarado 2012, p. 157, fig. 5.1). The unnamed Peten–Belize encompasses the Yalbac Hills (Bundschuh & Alvarado 2012, p. 162).)

==== Coasts ====
The most prominent topographic features of the Block's Caribbean coast are extensive seagrass beds and coral reefs, with the Belize Barrier Reef forming a notable example of the latter. Its Pacific coast, in contrast, is predominated by extensive mangrove forests.

=== Human ===
The terrestrial portion of the Block encompasses all six districts of Belize, five northerly departments of Guatemala (Huehuetenango, Quiche, Alta Verapaz, Izabal, and Peten), and five southeasterly states of Mexico (Chiapas, Tabasco, Campeche, Yucatán, and Quintana Roo). Its submarine portion encompasses the continental shelf which abuts the coastal districts.

== Geology ==
=== Stratigraphy ===
==== Crust ====
Mean thickness of the continental crust constituting the Block increases southwards, ranging from 20–25 kilometres (12–16 mi) in the northern Yucatán Peninsula to 30–40 kilometres (19–25 mi) in the Peninsula's south. The crust, i.e., Block's crystalline basement, is composed mainly of Silurian–Triassic metamorphic and igneous rocks and is exposed in at least five formations, namely, the Mixtequita Massif, Chiapas Massif, Cuchumatanes Dome, Tucuru–Teleman, and the Maya Mountains. Elsewhere, the basement is overlain by a thick sedimentary cover of Upper Palaeozoic clasts and carbonates, Upper Jurassic continental redbeds, and Cretaceous–Eocene carbonates and evaporites.

It has been suggested that the Block's continental basement is stretched, since its sedimentary cover reaches a thickness of up to 6 kilometres (3.7 mi), this being considered impossible on an unstretched basement at isostatic equilibrium. (Note: Sedimentary cover thickness diminishes to 0.750 kilometres (0.466 mi) within the Chicxulub crater (where the crystalline basement is uplifted), and 3.300 kilometres (2.051 mi) near the Yucatan Peninsula's centre (Guzman-Hidalgo et al. 2021, p. 4, fig. 2, Guzman-Hidalgo et al. 2021, pp. 7–8).)

=== Morphology ===
==== Provinces ====
The Block is thought to incorporate, fully or partially, two to thirteen geologic provinces.

==== Basins ====
The Block is believed to fully or partially comprehend some four or five sedimentary basins.

==== Faults ====
Several faults or fault zones have been identified within the Block, the most prominent of which include various boundary faults abutting the Maya Mountains, various offshore faults east of the Yucatán Peninsula–Belize, the Ticul Fault, the Malpaso Faults, and the Rio Hondo Faults. (Note: The Maya Block is additionally bounded by the Motagua–Polochic Faults, and possibly, faults in or near the Isthmus of Tehuantepec, as per section 'Extent' of this article.)

=== Tectonics ===
The Block is thought to experience significant counterclockwise rotation and a north-northwest down tilt, gradually lowering the northern portion of the Yucatán Platform, and thereby lifting its southern extreme in the Maya Mountains. It is nonetheless tectonically rigid or stable, experiencing an absolute west-southwest motion of 1.8 centimetres (0.71 in) per annum. (Note: With the Cocos Plate experiencing an absolute northeast motion of 7 centimetres (2.8 in) per annum, the Chortis Block a southeast motion of 0.9 centimetres (0.35 in) per annum, and the Cayman Ridge a southwest-northeast rifting of 2 centimetres (0.79 in) per annum (Authemayou et al. 2011, p. 2, fig. 1).) Central America, including the southern portion of the Maya Block, 'is very well-known and characterised by numerous, medium size earthquakes preceded and followed by damaging shocks,' with the Middle America Trench in the Pacific deemed the main source of such quakes. (Note: Ninety-three per cent of the total moment for M_{s} > 7.0 earthquakes in Central America during 1898–1994 was released along the Middle America Trench (Bundschuh & Alvarado 2012, p. 324). Earthquakes of M_{s} ≥ 8.0 have not been observed in Central America since 1505, though this 500-year period has been deemed 'not long enough to rule out the occurrence of such events in the region,' while 16th and 17th century Spanish historical records have been described as 'poor' (Bundschuh & Alvarado 2012, p. 324).) Of thirty-three earthquakes of M_{s} ≥ 7.0 in Central America during 1900–1993, the epicentres of at least two of these were located within the Block (in its southwestern quadrant), though a further nine were located near it (in the Motagua–Polochic Faults or the portion of the Middle America Trench bordering the Block).

=== History ===
==== Pre-Cenozoic ====
Middle America, including the Maya Block, is thought to have taken shape sometime after 170 million years ago. Its formation is thought to have 'involved [the] complex movement of [various] crustal blocks and terranes between the two pre-existing continental masses [i.e, North and South America].' Details of the pre-Cenozoic portion of this process (170–67 million years ago), however, are not widely agreed upon. (Note: Bundschuh & Alvarado 2012, pp. 10, 542–543 suggest that geologic models of the formation of Middle America differ most significantly in their handling of the Caribbean Plate, with one group of models proposing its formation in the Pacific and subsequent movement to its present location, and another group proposing its formation in its present location.) Nonetheless, it has been proposed that the Block formed before or during the opening of the Iapetus Ocean. It, together with the Oaxaquia, Suwannee, and Carolina Blocks, is thought to have constituted a peri-Gondwanan terrane on that continent's western, northwestern, northern, or eastern edge during the Appalachian–Caledonian or Ouachita–Marathon–Appalachian orogeny (that is, during the formation of Pangaea from the collision of Gondwana and Laurentia). It is thought to have been displaced away from the Laurentian craton by clockwise rotation, translation, or anticlockwise rotation, during the Middle Jurassic opening of the Gulf of Mexico and subsequent northwesterly drift of North America away from Pangaea. (Note: The palaeogeographic positions and tectonic interactions of pre-Mesozoic crustal blocks in present-day Mexico, Central America, and the Caribbean are still debated (Ross et al. 2021, p. 242). Fixing the pre-Mesozoic position of the Maya Black with respect to the southwestern margin of Laurentia is an important step in plate reconstructions of the assembly of Pangaea and the rotation-induced rifting and opening of the Gulf of Mexico (Ross et al. 2021, p. 242). Furthermore, Bundschuh & Alvarado 2012, p. 299 note – Numerous illustrations/models show the Maya and Chortis blocks originating in the Gulf of Mexico or [show the] Maya [block originating] in the Gulf and [the] Chortis [block elsewhere]. They are shown to have rotated clockwise or anticlockwise by as much as 80º about various poles or migrating poles to their present locations. The variety and complexity of interpretations reflects dominance of models over data. — Keith H. James in Bundschuh & Alvarado 2012, p. 299) (Note: However, Bundschuh & Alvarado 2012, p. 299 note – Similarity of basement, Jurassic and Cretaceous sections on [the] Maya and Chortis [blocks] should be reason to relate the two. Models should not deny stratigraphy. The two blocks have similar tectonic origins and similar structure. They are continental remnants of Pangean breakup, left at the western end of the Caribbean. [The] Maya [block] was sinistrally offset from [the] Chortis [block] when [the] early Cayman offset developed. Neither block is a terrane rotated into place form another location. The major Jurassic faults on [the] Maya and Chortis [blocks] (Río Hondo and Guayape) that remain parallel to coeval faults in the North and South America show that no rotation has occurred. Restoration of the blocks along the Cayman trend by re-aligning their eastern faulted margins also results in line-up the Río Hondo-Guayape systems. — Keith H. James in Bundschuh & Alvarado 2012, p. 299)

==== Cenozoic ====
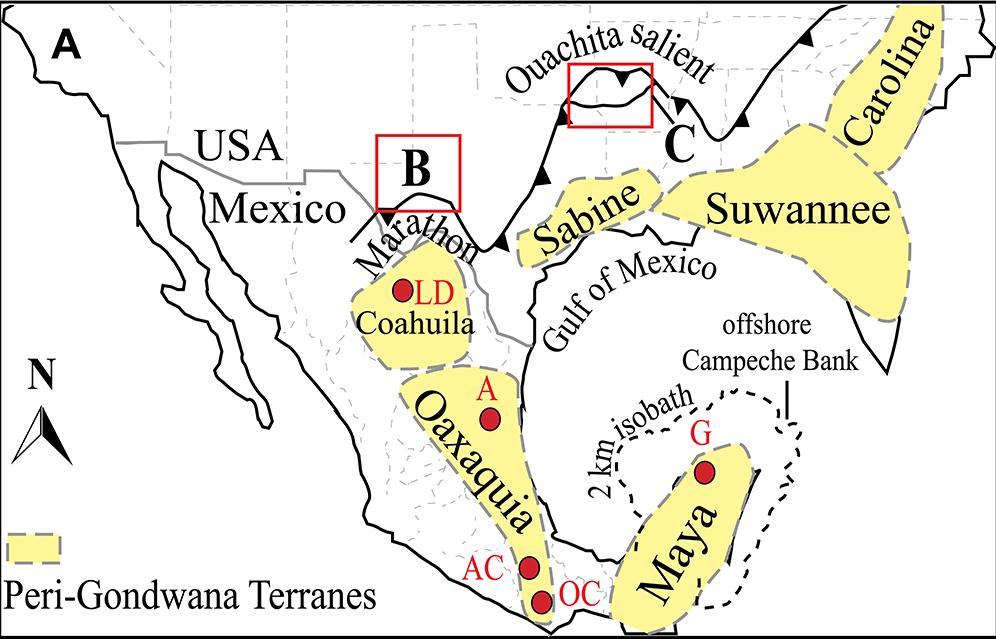
Peri-Gondwanan terranes of North America (in yellow; present configuration) / Fig 1A in Tian et al 2021 / via GSA

Details of the Cenozoic (66–0 million years ago) geologic history of Middle America, including that of the Maya Block, are relatively more widely agreed upon. In broad strokes, the Chortis Block is thought to have reached its present-day position at least 20 million years ago. The northern and eastern coasts of the Block are not thought to have been fully subaerially exposed until some 5–2 million years ago. The Block's coastlines, which were initially more extensive than their present-day counterparts, are thought to have reached their modern dimensions due to rising sea levels some 11–8 thousand years ago.

== Scholarship ==
The Block was discovered in 1969 by Gabriel Dengo, a Guatemalan geographer. It was quickly adopted in scholarship, and remains 'accepted by many as a valid subdivision of Central America's geology, especially of its crystalline basement.'

== Tables ==
=== Karstlands ===
Topographic characterisations of karstland in the northern portion of the Maya Block.
Description	Location	Notes
Block-faulted coastal plain	east	incl broad lagoons, mangrove swamps, and seasonal marshlands; incl north-northeast fault-bounded ridges and depressions; incl coral reefs and cayes
Pitted peninsular plain	north, west	incl dense network of cenotes; incl extensive, contiguous system of flooded caverns; not incl any surface streams
Hilly peninsular plain	west	incl La Sierrita de Ticul hills; incl ephemeral surface streams
Varied inland plain	south, west	incl steep, irregular hills and depressions; incl extensive fractures and caverns; incl vast alluvial plain with various large swamps and lakes; incl various surface streams

=== Provinces ===
Geologic provinces in the Maya Block per 21st century literature. (Note: USGS No. is the unique USGS province number as per French & Schenk 2004 and French & Schenk 2006.)
USGS No.	Name	Location	Notes
5308	Yucatán Platform	north	cf (Note: Largely coincident with the Yucatán platform province in Bundschuh & Alvarado 2012, p. 77, fig. 3.1 and the Maya Terrane province in Hasterok et al. 2022, p. 65, Zenodo version 1 dataset, QGIS file.)
6117	Greater Antilles Deformed Belt	east	cf (Note: Split into the Greater Antilles Accretionary Complex and Greater Antilles Arc provinces in Hasterok et al. 2022, p. 65, Zenodo version 1 dataset, QGIS file.)
6125	Maya Mountains	south	cf (Note: Encompassed by the Maya highlands province in Bundschuh & Alvarado 2012, p. 77, fig. 3.1 and the Mayan Highlands province in Hasterok et al. 2022, p. 65, Zenodo version 1 dataset, QGIS file.)
5310	Sierra Madre de Chiapas–Peten Foldbelt	south, west	cf (Note: Largely coincident with the Maya highlands province in Bundschuh & Alvarado 2012, p. 77, fig. 3.1 and the Mayan Highlands province in Hasterok et al. 2022, p. 65, Zenodo version 1 dataset, QGIS file.)
6122	Chiapas Massif–Nuclear Central America	south, west	–
6088	Pacific Offshore Basin	south, west	cf (Note: Largely coincident with the Central American Forearc province in Hasterok et al. 2022, p. 65, Zenodo version 1 dataset, QGIS file.)
5311	Chiapas Massif	west	–
5302	Veracruz Basin	west	–
5303	Tuxla Uplift	west	–
5307	Campeche–Sigsbee Salt Basin	north, west	–
5304	Saline–Comalcalco Basin	north, west	–
5305	Villahermosa Uplift	north, west	–
5306	Macuspana Basin	north, west	–

=== Basins ===
Sedimentary basins in the Maya Block per 21st century literature. (Note: Evenick ID is the unique basin identifier ie UBI as per Evenick 2021, app. A supp. no. 1. The Evenick ID for the Limon–Bocas del Toro Basin is not given in Evenick 2021, app. A supp. no. 1, though falls within 353–365, inclusive, given the alphabetical assignment of identifiers used therein.)
Evenick ID	Name	Location	Notes
119	Campeche	north, west	cf (Note: Encompassed by the Yucatan Platform basin in Robertson 2019.)
757	Yucatán	east	cf (Note: Encompassed by the Yucatan Platform basin in Robertson 2019.)
519	Peten–Corozal	south	cf (Note: Largely coincident with the Peten basin in Robertson 2019. Split into the Petén and Corozal–Belize–Amatique basins in Bundschuh & Alvarado 2012, p. 347, fig. 13.1.)
–	Limon–Bocas del Toro	south	cf (Note: Largely coincident with the Tehuantepec basin in Robertson 2019 and the Tehuantepec–Sandino–Nicoya basin in Bundschuh & Alvarado 2012, p. 347, fig. 13.1.)
647	Sureste	west	cf (Note: Largely coincident with the Salinas–Sureste basin in Robertson 2019.)

=== Tectonics ===
Earthquakes of M_{s} ≥ 7.0 during 1900–1993 with epicentres located in or near the Maya Block. (Note: For the Depth column, note N means normal crust focus, N+ means focus in lower crust or down to 60 kilometres (37 mi), and S means shallow event with macroseismic or instrumental evidence for a focus in the upper crust (Bundschuh & Alvarado 2012, p. 326, tab. 12.1). Some values in the Depth column rounded to the nearest mile.)
Date	Location	Lat. ºN	Lon. ºW	Depth mi	M_{s}
19 Apr 1902	SW Guatemala	14.9	91.5	0–25	7.5
3 Sep 1902	S Chiapas	16.5	92.5	N	7.6
14 May 1903	S Chiapas	15.0	93.0	N	7.6
4 Feb 1921	SW Guatemala	15.0	91.0	75	7.2
10 Dec 1925	S Chiapas	15.5	92.5	N	7.1
14 Dec 1935	S Chiapas	14.8	92.5	N	7.3
6 Aug 1942	SW Guatemala	14.8	91.3	25	7.9
28 Jun 1944	S Chiapas	14.3	92.6	N+	7.2
23 Oct 1950	SW Guatemala	14.3	91.8	19	7.3
29 Apr 1970	S Chiapas	14.6	92.6	N	7.3
4 Feb 1976	SE Guatemala	15.2	89.2	S	7.6

=== Timeline ===
Prominent events related to the geologic history of the Maya Block. (Note: In the Start and End columns, dates listed represent upper and lower bounds for the relevant event. In the Unit column, million years ago written as Ma, and billion years ago as Ga.)
Start	End	Unit	Epoch	Event	Notes
1600	910	Ma	Calymmian–Tonian	Maya Block basement formation starts	partially during Grenville orogeny; cf (Note: Though event dated with samples from the Polochic–Motagua Faults or the Isthmus of Tehuantepec (Bundschuh & Alvarado 2012, pp. 348–350, 486–499, 550, Casas-Peña et al. 2021, p. 209). Basement samples north of the Faults have returned mostly Triassic and some Silurian ages (Bundschuh & Alvarado 2012, pp. 348, 501). However, Casas-Peña et al. 2021, p. 209 note 'abundant ca. 1.0 Ga inherited zircon' and 1.02–0.91 Ga gneisses, amphibolites, and anorthosites in or near the Chiapas Massif, and 'abundant 1.2–0.9 Ga zircon' and 'a significant number of 1.6–1.5 Ga detrital zircon grains' in the Maya Mountains (both within the Maya Block proper rather than its border zones). Furthermore, Martens 2009, pp. v, 5 assert that 'isotope geochemistry and U/Pb zircon geochronology have demonstrated that the bulk of the Maya Block crust was generated during the 1.5–1.0 Ga period' and that 'the scarcity of older zircon ages as well as model ages suggest that the bulk of the Maya Block crust was generated during the 1.5–1.0 Ga period.') (Note: Though basement in the Yucatan Platform (ie northern portion of the Maya Block) 'is only known from Chicxulub ejecta suggesting ~545 Ma granitic basement and from a borehole on the peak ring of the Chicxulub crater that drilled into a ~326 Ma granitic pluton' (Casas-Peña et al. 2021, p. 209). Guzman-Hidalgo et al. 2021, p. 7 likewise report basement ages in the northern Yucatan Platform as circa 546, circa 545, circa 410, and circa 336.3–331.7 Ma.)
240	200	Ma	Middle Triassic–Early Jurassic	Pangaean rifting starts	cf (Note: With subaerial land portions of North and South America unlinked in circa 170 Ma (Bundschuh & Alvarado 2012, p. 382, Iturralde-Vinent & MacPhee 1999, p. 3). Bridgewater 2012, p. 30 dates rifting to Jurassic (200–146 Ma), and situates the Block at the southernmost part of Laurasia.)
165	165	Ma	Middle Jurassic	Gulf of Mexico seafloor spreading starts	incl exposed northern Yucatán Peninsula; cf
144	144	Ma	Early Cretaceous	Caribbean Sea seafloor spreading starts	cf (Note: Alternative models date the formation of the present-day Caribbean to during 130–80 million years ago (Bundschuh & Alvarado 2012, p. 211).)
120	120	Ma	Early Cretaceous	Chortis Block subduction into southwestern Mexico stops	cf (Note: Event recorded by 'a well-dated, 120 Ma-old subduction complex along the northern edge of the Chortis block presently exposed on the southern margin of the Motagua valley of Guatemala' (Bundschuh & Alvarado 2012, p. 212).)
78	72	Ma	Late Cretaceous	Greater Antilles Arc collision into Maya Block starts	cf
78	63	Ma	Late Cretaceous–Palaeocene	Chortis Block collision into Maya Block starts	cf (Note: Martens 2009, pp. 86–89, 101, 109 suggest that the Greater Antilles Arc, rather than the Chortis Block, was the first crustal segment of the Caribbean Plate to collide into the Maya Block during 77.4–73.6 Ma.)
66	66	Ma	Palaeocene	Chicxulub asteroid impact on Maya Block occurs	cf
49	49	Ma	Eocene	Cayman Trough rifting starts	cf
26	20	Ma	Oligocene–Miocene	Cayman Trough rifting slows down	cf
23	22	Ma	Miocene	Farallon Plate rifting starts	cf
22	22	Ma	Miocene	Cocos Plate subduction into Chortis Block starts	incl end of eastwards migration of Chortis Block; incl possible uplift of Chortis Block; incl formation of Bay of Honduras i.e. initial linking of Maya and Chortis Blocks; cf
19	10	Ma	Miocene	Super-fast spreading of East Pacific Rise starts and stops	cf
15	3	Ma	Miocene–Pliocene	Panamanian isthmus closure starts and stops	cf

== See also ==
- Carolina terrane, a similar peri-Gondwanan block

== Notes and references ==
=== Full citations ===
==== Journals ====
1. Abdullin F, Solari L, Ortega-Obregón C, Solé J (2018). "New fission-track results from the northern Chiapas Massif area, SE Mexico: trying to reconstruct its complex thermo-tectonic history". Revista Mexicana de Ciencias Geológicas. 35 (1): 79–92. Bibcode:2018RMxCG..35...79A. doi:10.22201/cgeo.20072902e.2018.1.523.
2. Authemayou C, Brocard G, Teyssier C, Simon-Labric T, Guttierrez A, Chiquin EN, Moran S (2011). "The Caribbean-North America-Cocos Triple Junction and the dynamics of the Polochic-Motagua fault systems: Pull-up and zipper models". Tectonics. article no. TC3010. 30 (3): 1–23. Bibcode:2011Tecto..30.3010A. doi:10.1029/2010TC002814. S2CID 128524307.
3. Braszus B, Goes S, Allen R, Rietbrock A, Collier J (9 July 2021). "Subduction history of the Caribbean from upper-mantle seismic imaging and plate reconstruction". Nature Communications. 12 (1): 1–14 of article no. 4211. Bibcode:2021NatCo..12.4211B. doi:10.1038/s41467-021-24413-0. PMC 8270990. PMID 34244511.
4. Casas-Peña JM, Ramírez-Fernández JA, Velasco-Tapia F, Alemán-Gallardo EA, Augustsson C, Weber B, Frei D, Jenchen U (2021). "Provenance and tectonic setting of the Paleozoic Tamatán Group, NE Mexico: Implications for the closure of the Rheic Ocean". Gondwana Research. 91: 205–230. Bibcode:2021GondR..91..205C. doi:10.1016/j.gr.2020.12.012. hdl:10566/6154. S2CID 233830928.
5. Cisneros de León A, Schmitt AK, Weber B (2022). "Multi-episodic formation of baddeleyite and zircon in polymetamorphic anorthosite and rutile-bearing ilmenitite from the Chiapas Massif Complex, Mexico". Journal of Metamorphic Geology. 40 (9): 1493–1527. Bibcode:2022JMetG..40.1493C. doi:10.1111/jmg.12683. S2CID 250161794.
6. Dengo G (1969). "Problems of tectonic relations between Central America and the Caribbean". Transactions of the Gulf Coast Association of Geological Societies. 19 (sn): 311–320. ISSN 0533-6562.
7. Evenick JC (2021). "Glimpses into Earth's history using a revised global sedimentary basin map". Earth-Science Reviews. article no. 103564. 215 (sn) 103564. Bibcode:2021ESRv..21503564E. doi:10.1016/j.earscirev.2021.103564. S2CID 233950439.
8. Filina I, Austin J, Doré T, Johnson E, Minguez D, Norton I, Snedden J, Sterne RJ (5 January 2022). "Opening of the Gulf of Mexico: What we know, what questions remain, and how we might answer them". Tectonophysics. 822: 1–30 of article no. 229150. Bibcode:2022Tectp.82229150F. doi:10.1016/j.tecto.2021.229150. S2CID 244425178.
9. Guzman-Hidalgo E, Grajales-Nishimura JM, Eberli GP, Aguayo-Camargo JE, Urrutia-Fucugauchi J, Perez-Cruz L (2021). "Seismic stratigraphic evidence of a pre-impact basin in the Yucatan Platform; morphology of the Chicxulub Crater and K/Pg boundary deposits". Marine Geology. article no. 106594. 441 (sn) 106594. Bibcode:2021MGeol.44106594G. doi:10.1016/j.margeo.2021.106594.
10. Iturralde-Vinent MA, MacPhee RD (1999). "Paleogeography of the Caribbean region; implications for Cenozoic biogeography". Bulletin of the American Museum of Natural History. sn (238): 1–95. hdl:2246/1642.
11. Ju Y, Wang G, Li S, Sun Y, Suo Y, Somerville I, Li W, He B, Zheng M, Yu K (2022). "Geodynamic mechanism and classification of basins in the Earth system". Gondwana Research. 102: 200–228. Bibcode:2022GondR.102..200J. doi:10.1016/j.gr.2020.08.017. S2CID 225114412.
12. Lawton TF, Blakey RC, Stockli DF, Liu L (2021). "Late Paleozoic (Late Mississippian–Middle Permian) sediment provenance and dispersal in western equatorial Pangea". Palaeogeography, Palaeoclimatology, Palaeoecology. 572: 1–35 of article no. 110386. Bibcode:2021PPP...57210386L. doi:10.1016/j.palaeo.2021.110386. S2CID 234844126.
13. Maldonado R, Ortega-Gutiérrez F, Ortíz-Joya GA (2018). "Subduction of Proterozoic to Late Triassic continental basement in the Guatemala suture zone: A petrological and geochronological study of high-pressure metagranitoids from the Chuacús complex". Lithos. 308–309: 83–103. Bibcode:2018Litho.308...83M. doi:10.1016/j.lithos.2018.02.030.
14. Martens U, Weber B, Valencia VA (2010). "U/Pb geochronology of Devonian and older Paleozoic beds in the southeastern Maya block, Central America: Its affinity with peri-Gondwanan terranes". GSA Bulletin. 122 (5–6): 815–829. Bibcode:2010GSAB..122..815M. doi:10.1130/B26405.1.
15. Ortega-Gutierrez F, Elias-Herrera M, Moran-Zenteno DJ, Solari L, Weber B, Luna-Gonzalez L (2018). "The pre-Mesozoic metamorphic basement of Mexico, 1.5 billion years of crustal evolution". Earth-Science Reviews. 183 (sn): 2–37. Bibcode:2018ESRv..183....2O. doi:10.1016/j.earscirev.2018.03.006. S2CID 134436220.
16. Ortega-Gutierrez F, Solari LA, Ortega-Obregon C, Elias-Herrera M, Martens U, Moran-Ical S, Chiquin M (2007). "The Maya-Chortis boundary; a tectonostratigraphic approach". International Geology Review. 49 (11): 996–1024. Bibcode:2007IGRv...49..996O. doi:10.2747/0020-6814.49.11.996. S2CID 140702379.
17. Pindell J, Maresch WV, Martens U, Stanek K (2012). "The Greater Antillean Arc: Early Cretaceous origin and proposed relationship to Central American subduction mélanges: implications for models of Caribbean evolution". International Geology Review. 54 (2): 131–143. Bibcode:2012IGRv...54..131P. doi:10.1080/00206814.2010.510008. S2CID 67762780.
18. Radmacher W, Vásquez OJ, Tzalam M, Jolomná M, Molineros A, Eldrett JS (2021). "What happened to the organic matter from the Upper Cretaceous succession in Guatemala, Central America?". Marine and Petroleum Geology. article no. 105246. 133 105246. Bibcode:2021MarPG.13305246R. doi:10.1016/j.marpetgeo.2021.105246.
19. Ratschbacher L, Franz L, Min M, Bachmann R, Martens U, Stanek K, Stuebner K (2009). "The North American-Caribbean Plate boundary in Mexico-Guatemala-Honduras". Geological Society Special Publication. 328 (1): 219–293. Bibcode:2009GSLSP.328..219R. doi:10.1144/SP328.11. S2CID 140582699.
20. Ross CH, Stockli DF, Rasmussen C, Gulick SP, Graaff SJ, Claeys P, Zhao J (2021). "Evidence of Carboniferous arc magmatism preserved in the Chicxulub impact structure". Geological Society of America Bulletin. 134 (1–2): 241–260. doi:10.1130/B35831.1. hdl:10044/1/99016. S2CID 238043996.
21. Solari LA, García-Casco A, Martens U, Lee JK, Ortega-Rivera A (2013). "Late Cretaceous subduction of the continental basement of the Maya block (Rabinal Granite, central Guatemala): Tectonic implications for the geodynamic evolution of Central America". GSA Bulletin. 125 (3–4): 625–639. Bibcode:2013GSAB..125..625S. doi:10.1130/B30743.1.
22. Tian H, Fan M, Valencia VA, Chamberlain K, Stern RJ, Waite L (22 November 2021). "Mississippian southern Laurentia tuffs came from a northern Gondwana arc". Geology. 50 (3): 266–271. doi:10.1130/G49502.1.
23. Villeneuve M, Marcaillou B (2013). "Pre-Mesozoic origin and paleogeography of blocks in the Caribbean, South Appalachian and West African domains and their impact on the post "Variscan" evolution". Bulletin de la Société Géologique de France. 184 (1–2): 5–20. doi:10.2113/gssgfbull.184.1-2.5.
24. Weber B, Iriondo A, Premo WR, Hecht L, Schaaf P (2007). "New insights into the history and origin of the southern Maya block, SE México: U–Pb–SHRIMP zircon geochronology from metamorphic rocks of the Chiapas massif". International Journal of Earth Sciences: Geologische Rundschau. 96 (2): 253–269. Bibcode:2007IJEaS..96..253W. doi:10.1007/s00531-006-0093-7. S2CID 55983939.
25. Weber B, Scherer EE, Martens UK, Mezger K (2012). "Where did the lower Paleozoic rocks of Yucatan come from? A U–Pb, Lu–Hf, and Sm–Nd isotope study". Chemical Geology. 312–313: 1–17. Bibcode:2012ChGeo.312....1W. doi:10.1016/j.chemgeo.2012.04.010.
26. Weber B, Valencia VA, Schaaf P, Pompa-Mera V, Ruíz J (2008). "Significance of Provenance Ages from the Chiapas Massif Complex (Southeastern Mexico): Redefining the Paleozoic Basement of the Maya Block and Its Evolution in a Peri-Gondwanan Realm". Journal of Geology. 116 (6): 619–639. Bibcode:2008JG....116..619W. doi:10.1086/591994. S2CID 129457021.
27. Zhao J, Xiao L, Gulick SP, Morgan JV, Kring D, Urrutia-Fucugauchi J (2020). "Geochemistry, geochronology and petrogenesis of Maya Block granitoids and dykes from the Chicxulub Impact Crater, Gulf of México: Implications for the assembly of Pangea". Gondwana Research. 82 (sn): 128–150. Bibcode:2020GondR..82..128Z. doi:10.1016/j.gr.2019.12.003. S2CID 214359672.

==== Print ====
1. Bridgewater S (2012). A Natural History of Belize. Corrie Herring Hooks Series no. 52. Austin, Texas; London: University of Texas Press; Natural History Museum. doi:10.7560/726710. ISBN 978-0-292-72671-0.
2. Bundschuh J, Alvarado GE, eds. (2012) [2007]. Central America: Geology, Resources and Hazards (Reprint of 1st ed.). London: Taylor & Francis. doi:10.1201/9780203947043. ISBN 978-0-429-07437-0. OCLC 905983675.
3. Dengo G, Case JH, eds. (1990). The Caribbean Region. The Geology of North America; v. H. Boulder, Colo.: Geological Society of America. hdl:2027/mdp.39015018862931. ISBN 978-0-8137-5212-9. OCLC 21909394.
4. Mann P, ed. (1999). Caribbean Basins. Sedimentary Basins of the World. Vol. 4. Amsterdam: Elsevier. ISBN 0-444-82649-1. OCLC 43540498.

==== Theses ====
1. Jenson AA (2019). Hydrogeologic and Speleogenetic Constraints of a Coastal Karst Aquifer: Sistema Jaguar, Quintana Roo, Mexico (PhD). Texas State University. ProQuest 27805380.
2. Martens U (2009). Geologic evolution of the Maya Block (southern edge of the North American plate): An example of terrane transferral and crustal recycling (PhD). Stanford University. ProQuest 304999167.
3. Monroy-Rios E (2020). Advancements in Our Understanding of the Yucatán Platform: Sedimentary Geology and Geochemistry, Speleogenesis, Chicxulub Ring of Cenotes, and Tectonic Stability (PhD). Northwestern University. ProQuest 2469739315.
4. Steier A (2018). Jurassic-Cretaceous Stratigraphic and Structural Evolution of the Northern Yucatan Margin, Gulf of Mexico Basin (MS). University of Houston. ProQuest 13836835.

==== Maps ====
1. DTM (June 2013). Deep Time Maps North America Key Time Slices (Map). 1:1,000,000. Sedona, Arizona: Colorado Plateau Geosystems. Archived from the original on 18 October 2022.
2. French CD, Schenk CJ (2004). "Map showing geology, oil and gas fields, and geologic provinces of the Caribbean Region". Open-File Report (Report). Open-File Report 97-470-K. Reston, Virg.: U.S. Geological Survey. doi:10.3133/ofr97470K.
3. French CD, Schenk CJ (2006). "Map showing geology, oil and gas fields, and geologic provinces of the Gulf of Mexico region". In French CD, Schenk CJ (eds.). Open-File Report (Report). Open-File Report 97-470-L. Reston, Virg.: U.S. Geological Survey. doi:10.3133/ofr97470L.
4. Robertson (2019). "Robertson Basins and Plays (Tellus™) - Sedimentary Basins of the World Map". AAPG Datapages (Report). Tulsa, Oklahoma: Datapages.

==== Other ====
1. Filina I, Beutel E (26 May 2022). "Geological and Geophysical Constraints Guide New Tectonic Reconstruction of the Gulf of Mexico". Ess Open Archive ePrints. 105: 1–35. Bibcode:2022esoar.10511463F. doi:10.1002/essoar.10511463.1.
2. Hasterok D, Halpin JA, Collins AS, Hand M, Kreemer C, Gard M (21 May 2022). "New maps of global geological provinces and tectonic plates". Earth ArXiv: 1–101. doi:10.31223/X5TD1C.
