= Chortis Block =

Geologic formation in Central America

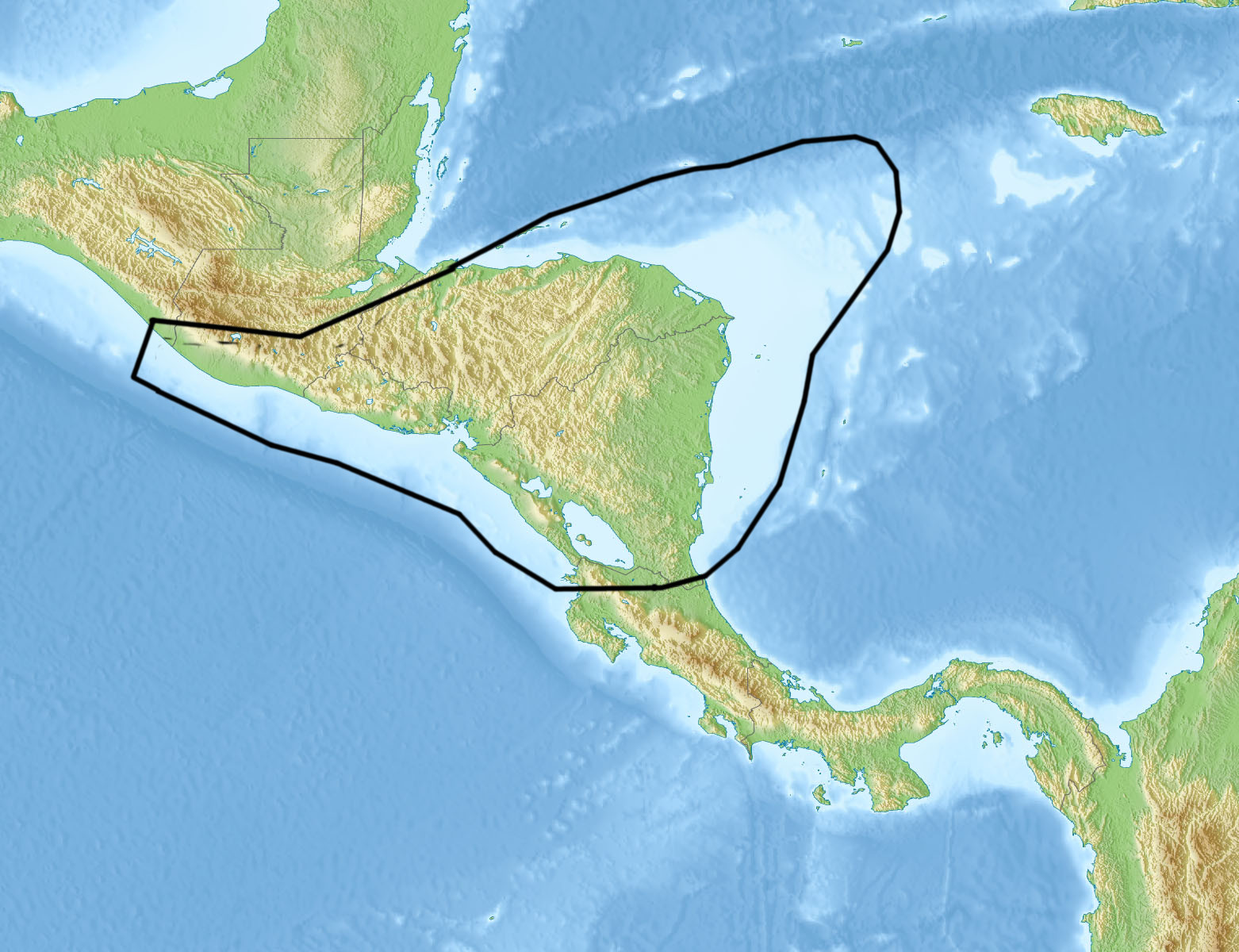
Extent of Chortis Block

The Chortis Block is a 400–600 kilometres (250–370 mi) continental fragment in Central America (Honduras, Nicaragua, El Salvador, Guatemala, and the off-shore Nicaragua Rise) located in the northwest corner of the oceanic Caribbean Plate.

== Extent ==
The northern margin of the Chortis Block is the Motagua-Polochic fault of the North American-Caribbean strike-slip boundary. The Cocos/Farallon Plate subducts beneath its western margin resulting in the Middle America Trench and the Central America Volcanic Arc. Miocene-Holocene-aged rifts in the northern and western Chortis Block is the result of slow internal deformation. The southern and eastern extent is roughly the Nicaragua-Costa Rica border and the offshore Hess Escarpment.

The Chortis Block can be subdivided into several terranes, the names and extents of which varies considerably between different authors.

== Tectonic history ==
=== Gondwanan origin ===
During the Late Neoproterozoic-Early Palaeozoic the Chortis Block was probably located on the northern shores of what is now Colombia, then the northern margin of the Amazonian Craton, with an ocean separating it and the other blocks from core North America or Laurentia. Before the Early Carboniferous formation of Pangaea the Chortis Block thus formed part of the northern margin of Gondwana, located south of other Peri-Gondwanan terranes such as Oaxaca, Carolina, Yucatán, and Florida. These blocks either escaped the Laurussia-Gondwana collision and were broken off Gondwana later, or were accreted to Laurentia during the collision.

=== Laurentian origin ===
Located in a largely unpopulated, mountainous region, the geology of which is poorly known, the Chortis Block is the only Precambrian-Palaeozoic continental crust on the Caribbean Plate and even its origin within North America has remained enigmatic and disputed for decades.

Three models have been proposed for the origin of the Chortis Block:

- According to the first, most widely accepted model, the Chortis Block moved c. 1,100 km (680 mi) eastward and rotated counterclockwise 30-40° along the Cayman-Motagua-Polochic fault system from its Middle Eocene location off the southwestern coast of Mexico. This model is supported by matching lineations in the Chortis Block and Mexico.
- A second model proposes that the Chortis Block originated in the eastern Pacific Ocean 700–800 km (430–500 mi) south of the Cayman-Motagua-Polochic fault. From this remote location it has moved 1,100 km (680 mi) while rotating 40° clockwise. This rotation is, however, not supported by geological observations.
- A third, in situ model suggests that the Chortis Block has been located more or less just south of Mexico since North and South America separated in the Late Jurassic. This model is based on matching lineaments in the Chortis Block and the areas surrounding it.

== See also ==
- Caribbean large igneous province
- Galápagos hotspot
