= Yucatán Channel =

Strait between Mexico and Cuba

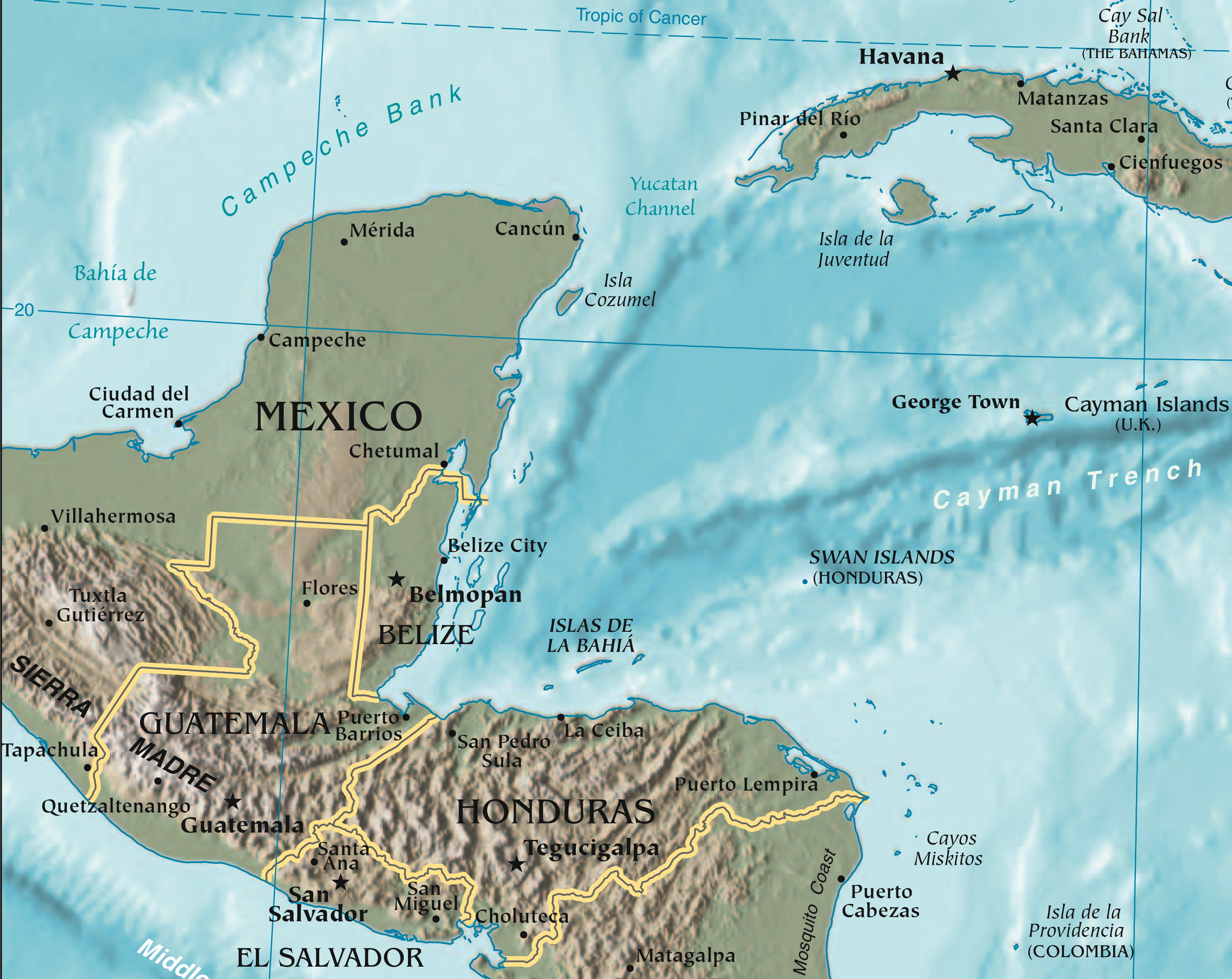
- Map of the region.

- Location within the Caribbean
- Coordinates: 21°34′42″N 85°54′27″W
- Max. width: 217 kilometres (135 mi)
- Max. depth: 2,779 metres (9,117 ft)

The Yucatán Channel (Spanish: Canal de Yucatán) or the Straits of Yucatán is a strait between Mexico and Cuba. It connects the Yucatán Basin of the Caribbean Sea with the Gulf of Mexico. It is just over 200 kilometres (120 mi) wide and nearly 2,800 metres (9,200 ft) deep at its deepest point near the coast of Cuba.

== Currents ==
The Yucatán Channel separates Cuba from the Yucatán Peninsula of Mexico and links the Caribbean Sea with the Gulf of Mexico. The strait is 217 kilometres (135 mi) across between Cape Catoche in Mexico and Cape San Antonio in Cuba. It has a maximum depth near the Cuban coast of 2,779 metres (9,117 ft). Water flows through the Caribbean Sea from east to west. This flow consists of 5 Sv of water from the North Equatorial Current flowing through the Windward Passage and 12 Sv of water from the South Equatorial Current which flows along the coast of Brazil. The total flow is about 17 Sv at a temperature of at least 17 °C (63 °F). When this water flows past the Yucatán Peninsula it becomes the Yucatán Current. This current provides most of the inflow of water into the Gulf of Mexico as the amount of water entering by the Straits of Florida is small and intermittent. The Yucatán Current flows strongly on the western side of the channel while the Cuban Countercurrent flows in the opposite direction on the easterly side of the channel. Underneath the Yucatán Current there is a southward-flowing Yucatán Undercurrent which takes water away from the Gulf of Mexico.

== Coral reefs ==
As the water flowing through the Yucatán Channel enters the Gulf of Mexico, it passes over the Campeche Bank, a shallow area of sea. Here, there are coral reefs on the outer fringes of the Yucatán shelf about 100 kilometres (62 mi) offshore. The main reef-building corals here are Acropora cervicornis, Acropora palmata, and Montastraea annularis, and in the late 1990s many of these died. Some recolonisation has since taken place. The Campeche Bank is a biodiverse area, and this and other parts of the Yucatán Channel are heavily fished by artisan fishermen who converge on the area from along the coast of Mexico. The area is threatened by overexploitation.

== See also ==
- List of straits
