= Feridun Ahmed Bey =

Ottoman official, bureaucrat, author, and military officer

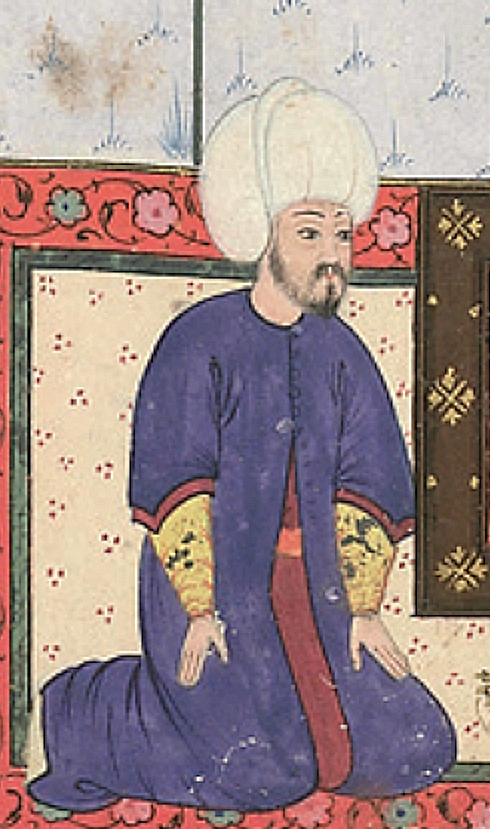
Feridun Ahmed Bey attending Grand Vizier Sokollu Mehmed Pasha mourning the sultan’s death in 1566. Nüzhet (1568-69).

Feridun Ahmed Bey (Note: Also spelled "Ahmet" or "Beg".) (died 16 March 1583) was an Ottoman official, bureaucrat, writer and military officer, best known for his service in the government of Grand Vizier Sokollu Mehmed Pasha (1565–1579). He was the second husband of Ayşe Hümaşah Sultan, granddaughter of Sultan Suleiman the Magnificent. The Münșeâtu's-Selâtin is his most important work, a two-volume compilation going back to early Islamic periods. According to Selcuk Aksin Somel, this work is "crucial for the study of early and classical periods of Ottoman history". Another work is Nüzhet-i Esrâr, a historical chronicle of the Siege of Szigetvár by the Ottomans in 1566.

== Biography ==
Feridun Ahmed Bey's date of birth is unknown. According to his own writings, he was born to a certain Abdülkadır (ʿAbd al-Qādir). Feridun Ahmed Bey was probably of devshirme origin. He was a protégé of Sokollu Mehmed Pasha and was reputable at the Siege of Szigetvár in 1566. He served as secretary of state (Reis ül-Küttab) from 1570 to 1573, and as chancellor (Nişancı) from 1573 to 1576. Following the ascension of Murad III (r. 1574–1595), Sokollu Mehmed Pasha's power dwindled, and so did Feridun Ahmed Bey's. In the subsequent period he was sent to serve under the sanjakbeys of Smederevo and Köstendil. In 1581, he was recalled to Constantinople and was reappointed as Nişancı. Feridun Ahmed Bey died on 16 March 1583.

== Sources ==
- Tarim, Zeynep (2019). "Sigetvarname: A Visual Source of Sultan Süleyman's Last Campaign". The Battle for Central Europe: The Siege of Szigetvár and the Death of Süleyman the Magnificent and Nicholas Zrínyi (1566). Leiden; Boston : Budapest: BRILL; HAS, Research Centre for the Humanities. p. 411. ISBN 9789004396234.
- Somel, Selcuk Aksin (2010). The A to Z of the Ottoman Empire. Scarecrow Press. ISBN 978-0810875791.
- Vatin, Nicolas (2014). "Feridun Bey". In Fleet, Kate; Krämer, Gudrun; Matringe, Denis; Nawas, John; Rowson, Everett (eds.). Encyclopaedia of Islam (3rd ed.). Brill Online. ISSN 1873-9830.
- Vesel, Rudolf (1999). "FERİDUN AḤMED BEG, ʿABD-AL-QĀDER". In Yarshater, Ehsan (ed.). Encyclopædia Iranica. Vol. IX/5: Fauna III–Festivals VIII. London and New York: Routledge & Kegan Paul. pp. 534–535. ISBN 978-0-933273-33-7.
