= Siege of Gyula (1566) =

1566 siege in Hungary during the Ottoman–Habsburg wars

- Part of the Ottoman–Habsburg wars Ottoman wars in Europe; Habsburg–Ottoman war of 1565–1568
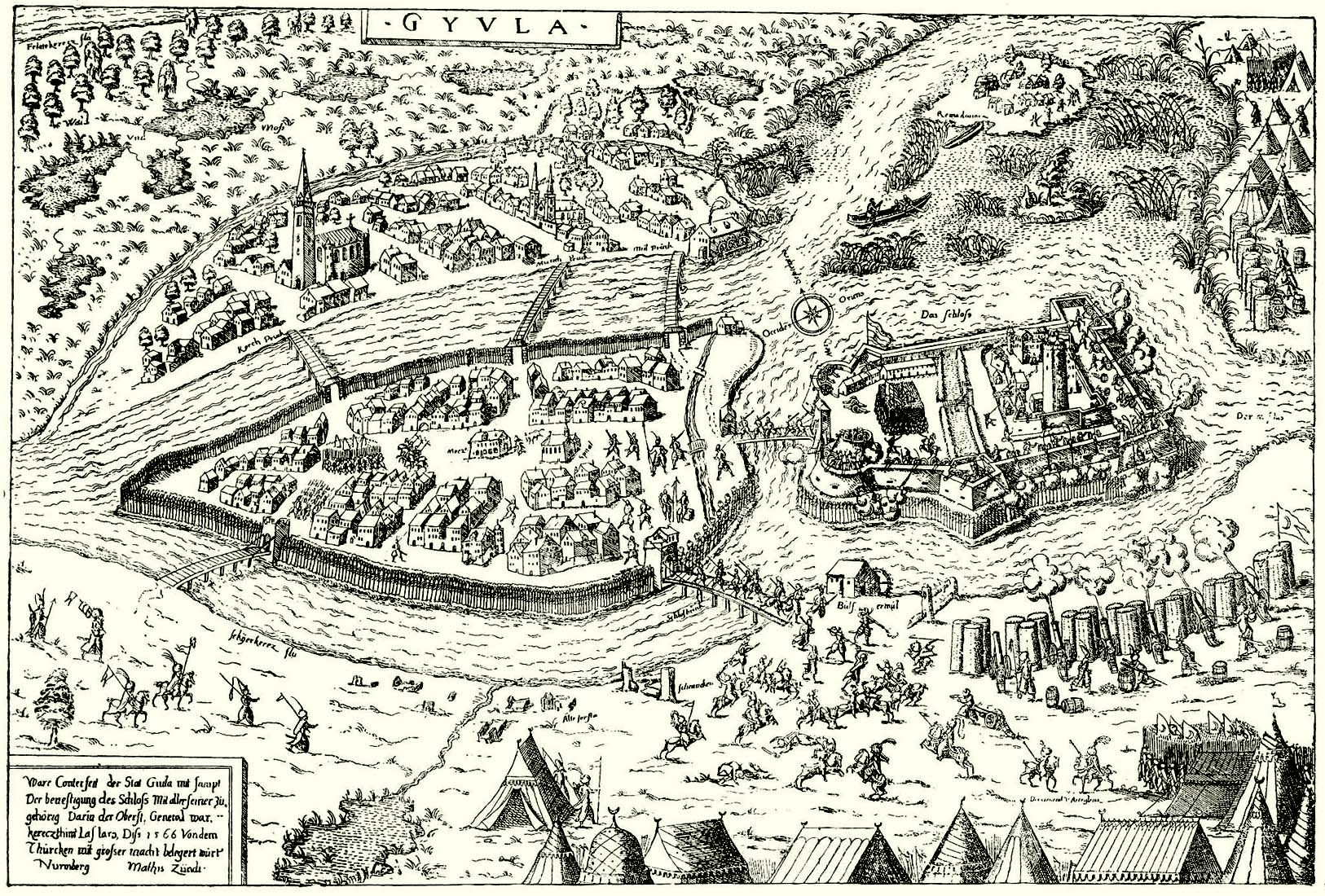
- Gyula fortress in 1566
Date	2 July – 2 September 1566
Location	Gyula, Kingdom of Hungary 46°39′0.00″N 21°16′58.01″E
Result	Ottoman victory

Belligerents
Habsburg monarchy; Kingdom of Hungary	Ottoman Empire

Commanders and leaders
László Kerecsényi (surrendered)	Pertev Pasha

Strength
~2,000	30,000–35,000

Casualties and losses
Heavy losses	Heavy losses
- Location within Hungary

The Siege of Gyula was a prolonged Ottoman siege of the Hungarian fortress of Gyula in 1566, part of Suleiman I's last campaign. The fortress was an important Habsburg defensive stronghold in eastern Hungary and represented a key point in the frontier system between Habsburg and Ottoman territories. Gyula was situated within the Ottoman network of fortresses at Temesvár, Szeged and Szolnok, and controlled access to the Körös valley route, making it the campaign's second major target after Szigetvár. The siege lasted 63 days, making it the longest siege in 16th-century Hungary.

== Background ==
By the 1560s, Gyula had become an important Habsburg defensive stronghold in eastern Hungary. Its captain, László Kerecsényi, commanded substantial local military and financial resources, and the castle represented Habsburg authority in Ottoman-held territory by collecting taxes from the sultan's subjects. After Queen Isabella's death in 1559, her son John Sigismund ruled Transylvania as an Ottoman vassal. However, Habsburg interference and the defection of the nobleman Menyhért Balassa led to imperial troops seizing key castles such as Tokaj and Nagybánya. Grand Vizier Sokollu Mehmed viewed this as a threat to the Ottoman-aligned Transylvanian regime. Furthermore, Gyula was almost completely surrounded by the Ottoman network of fortresses at Temesvár, Szeged and Szolnok, making it a prime target for the 1566 campaign.

== Siege ==
The siege of Gyula began on 2 July 1566, when Second Vizier Pertev Pasha arrived with an army of approximately 30,000–35,000 men. The castle, located on an island in the Fehér-Körös River, was defended by around 2,000 Hungarian, Croatian, and German soldiers under the command of László Kerecsényi, a veteran who had previously served as captain of Szigetvár. The high water level of the river initially forced the Ottoman artillery to operate from a relatively long distance, which delayed effective bombardment until the surrounding waters were partially drained.

Similar to Szigetvár, Gyula consisted of three defense sections. The outer castle resisted for 27 days, while the inner core, including the medieval brick castle and surrounding ramparts, held for a further 9 days before surrender negotiations began. During the siege, Kerecsényi’s forces repelled several Ottoman assaults over the course of approximately two months. The fortress ultimately fell on 2 September after a 63-day siege, one of the longest in 16th-century Hungary.

== Aftermath ==
The fall of Gyula on 2 September 1566 eliminated a major Habsburg stronghold in eastern Hungary, securing Ottoman control and protecting their vassal Transylvania. Sultan Süleyman died during the concurrent siege of Szigetvár on 7 September. Grand Vizier Sokollu Mehmed concealed the death to prevent mutiny. Although celebrated as a victory, Süleyman's death demonstrated the limits of Ottoman expansion into Hungary.
