= Emil Anka =

Hungarian chess grandmaster (born 1969)

Personal information
- Born: 20 January 1969 (age 57) Gyula, Hungary

Chess career
- Country: Hungary
- Title: Grandmaster (2011)
- Peak rating: 2487 (July 1999)

Emil Anka (born 20 January 1969) is a Hungarian Chess Grandmaster. He moved to the United States in 2010, and lives in Kirkland, Washington. He also teaches chess and runs local chess tournaments.
