= Siege of Szigetvár =

1566 battle in Hungary during the Ottoman–Habsburg wars

Siege of Szigetvár Battle of Szigeth
- Part of the Ottoman–Habsburg wars Ottoman wars in Europe; Habsburg–Ottoman war of 1565–1568
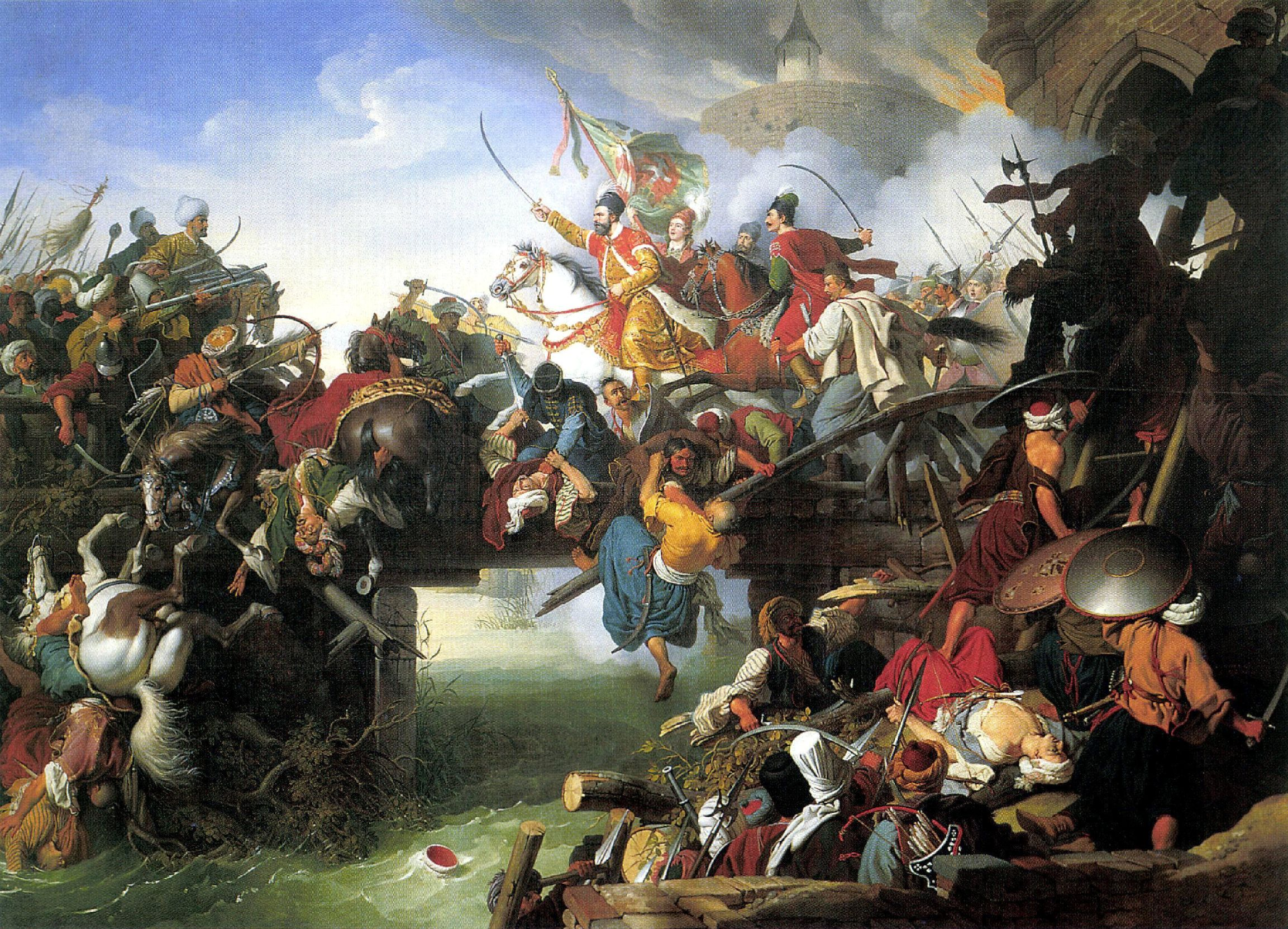
- Nikola IV Zrinski's charge from the fortress of Szigetvár (painting by Johann Peter Krafft, 1825)
Date	6 August 1566 – 8 September 1566 (1 month and 2 days)
Location	Szigetvár, Kingdom of Hungary 46°03′03″N 17°47′49″E
Result	Ottoman victory
Territorial changes	Ottomans capture Szigetvár and place it under their Budin Eyalet

Belligerents
Habsburg Empire; Kingdom of Croatia; Kingdom of Hungary	Ottoman Empire; Eastern Hungarian Kingdom

Commanders and leaders
Nikola IV Zrinski †	Suleiman I # (Note: Died of natural causes during the course of the siege.); Sokollu Mehmed Pasha

Strength
2,300 – 3,000 Croats and Hungarians: 600 able-bodied men by the end of the siege	50,000 – 100,000: 300 cannons

Casualties and losses
Almost entire garrison wiped out. 2,300 – 3,000 killed in combat	20,000–30,000 total casualties
- Location within Europe Siege of Szigetvár (Hungary)

The siege of Szigetvár or the Battle of Szigeth (pronunciation: [ˈsiɡɛtvaːr]; Hungarian: Szigetvár ostroma; Croatian: Bitka kod Sigeta, Sigetska bitka; Turkish: Zigetvar Kuşatması) was an Ottoman siege of the fortress of Szigetvár in the Kingdom of Hungary. The fort had blocked Sultan Suleiman's line of advance towards Vienna in 1566. The battle was fought between the defending forces of the Habsburg monarchy under the leadership of Nikola IV Zrinski, the former Ban of Croatia, and the invading Ottoman army under the nominal command of Sultan Suleiman.

In January 1566, Suleiman began his offensive campaign in Hungary. The siege of Szigetvár was fought from 5 August to 8 September 1566 and it resulted in an Ottoman victory. Some historians have viewed the victory as pyrrhic as there were heavy losses on both sides. Both commanders died during the course of the siege – Zrinski during the final charge, and Suleiman in his tent from natural causes. The siege lasted for a total of 33 days.

More than 20,000 Ottomans died during the siege, and almost all of Zrinski's 2,300-man garrison was killed, with most of the final 600 men killed on the last day. Although the Ottomans were victorious, the siege stopped the planned Ottoman push towards Vienna that year. Vienna was not threatened again until the Battle of Vienna in 1683.

The importance of the battle was considered so great that the French clergyman and statesman Cardinal Richelieu was reported to have described it as "the battle that saved (Western) civilization". The battle is still famous in Croatia and Hungary and inspired both the Hungarian epic poem The Siege of Sziget and the Croatian opera Nikola Šubić Zrinski.

== Background ==
=== Historical events ===
A peace agreement between the Habsburgs and the Ottomans was in effect until 1552, when Suleiman decided to attack Eger. The Siege of Eger proved futile, and the Habsburg victory reversed a period of territorial losses in Hungary. Their retention of Eger gave the Austrians good reason to believe that Hungary was still contested ground and that the Ottoman campaign in Hungary had also ended, until its revival in 1566.

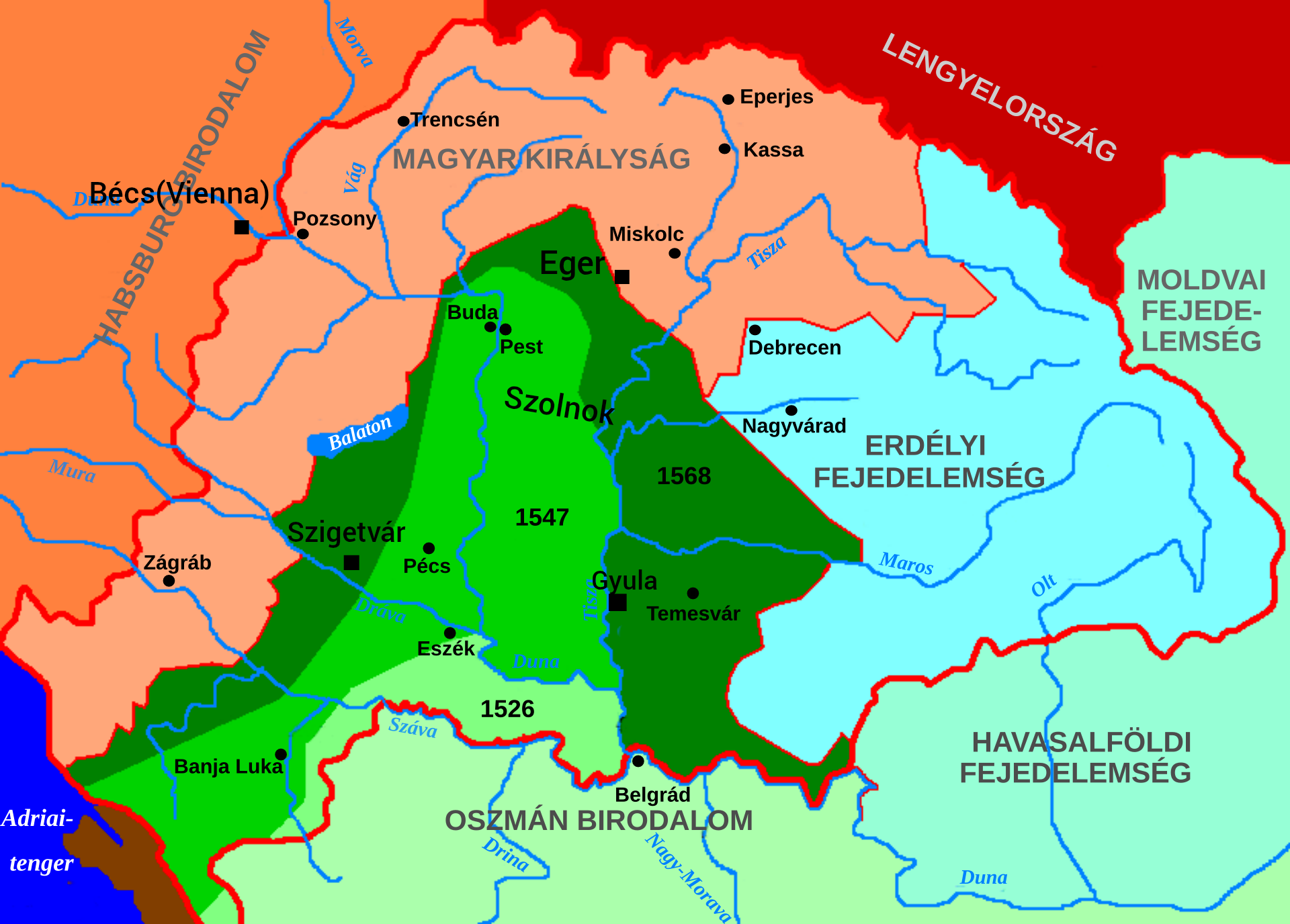
Ottoman conquests in Hungary 1541-1568

The siege of Tokaj in 1565 by the Imperial Army under the command of Lazarus von Schwendi had angered Suleiman. The latter considered Transylvania to be his realm, and did not consider the peace treaty signed between John Sigismund Zápolya and the Holy Roman Empire to be valid.

A peace treaty between the Ottomans and Habsburgs had been negotiated in 1565 after Ferdinand's death in 1564. Ottoman officials had sent multiple letters to Emperor Maximilian on the following issues: the payment of tribute, Habsburg infiltration in Ottoman territories, the return of the Ottoman emissary Hidayet Ağa, and the potential invalidity of the 1565 treaty if the Habsburgs did not withdraw their forces from Transylvania. These have been listed as some of the reasons for the Ottoman campaign in Hungary.

Szigetvár, Márk Horváth, its commander, and bandits in the fort's vicinity had also been previously infuriating for Suleiman. The Ottomans had already besieged the fort twice in 1555 and 1556. In a letter he had sent to Ferdinand in 1557, he had written "The fortress of Szigetvár... When the haydud and robbers make trouble and commit evil acts, they take refuge in this fortress." Also, in a remark to the diplomat Ogier Ghiselin de Busbecq in the year 1562, Suleiman had said: "'What', said he, 'might make us conclude peace, if those who are in charge of Sigeth will disturb it and continue the war?'"

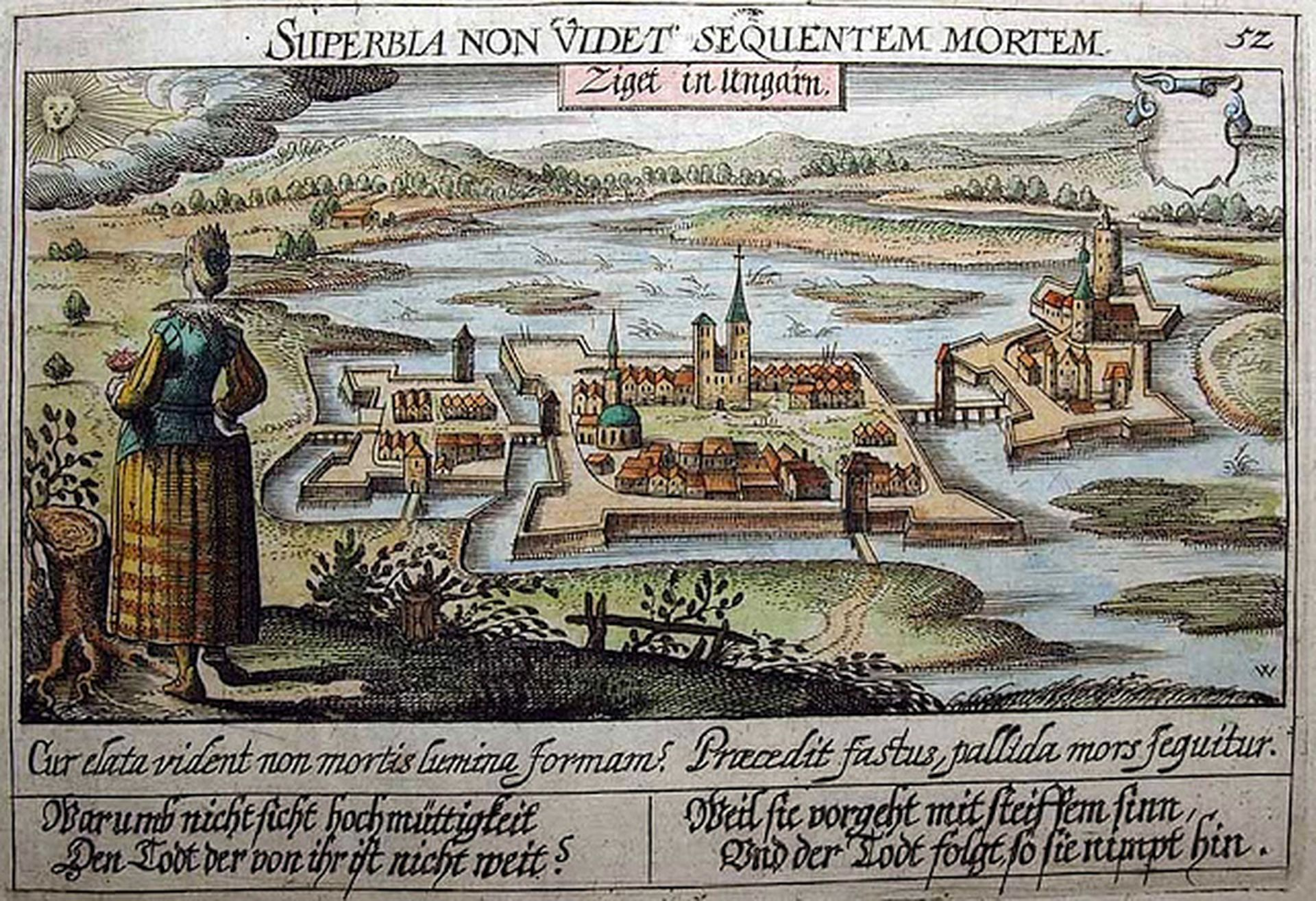
Artistic impression of the fort of Szigetvár by the engravers Daniel Meisner and Eberhard Kieser, 1625

Suleiman had written to John Sigismund on 7 October 1565 that "he would go to war the following spring, if Maximilian did not send an ambassador with suitable assurances of peace". After the siege of Nagybanya by Schwendi, Suleiman wrote to John Sigismund that he would personally arrive in Hungary with his army by the following spring.

=== Geography ===
Szigetvár was considered important primarily since forces dispatched from there could cut the enemy lines around the Danube river and thus threaten Buda and Ottoman Hungary. The fort had also obstructed Ottoman conquests in Southern Transdanubia because it controlled movement on the Drava river and had also threatened Virovitica and Požega among other Ottoman border forts in the region of Slavonia.

The fort was surrounded by the Mecsek range which provided natural defense. The usage of canals ensured that the valley around the fort was always inundated with water. Even if a besieger was to break the canals, the dried waterbed around the fort would be muddy and covered with vegetation, thus preventing infantry charges and the deployment of artillery guns near the walls. The fort did not have defensive outworks or a moat, partly because the marshland surrounding the fort was greater in width than most such constructions. Crossing the marshland was a complex task for any besieging army. The Szigetvár fort complex had a total of four forts.

== Logistics and preparation ==
=== Habsburg ===
On 18 August 1565, Emperor Maximilian wrote to his brothers that the Habsburgs would have to be prepared for a war. However, since they had expected the main focus of the Ottoman campaign to be Vienna, they concentrated on the city and had no plans to lift the siege of Szigetvár. Emperor Maximilian and the Habsburg army were thus encamped near Győr but did not lift the siege.

=== Ottoman ===
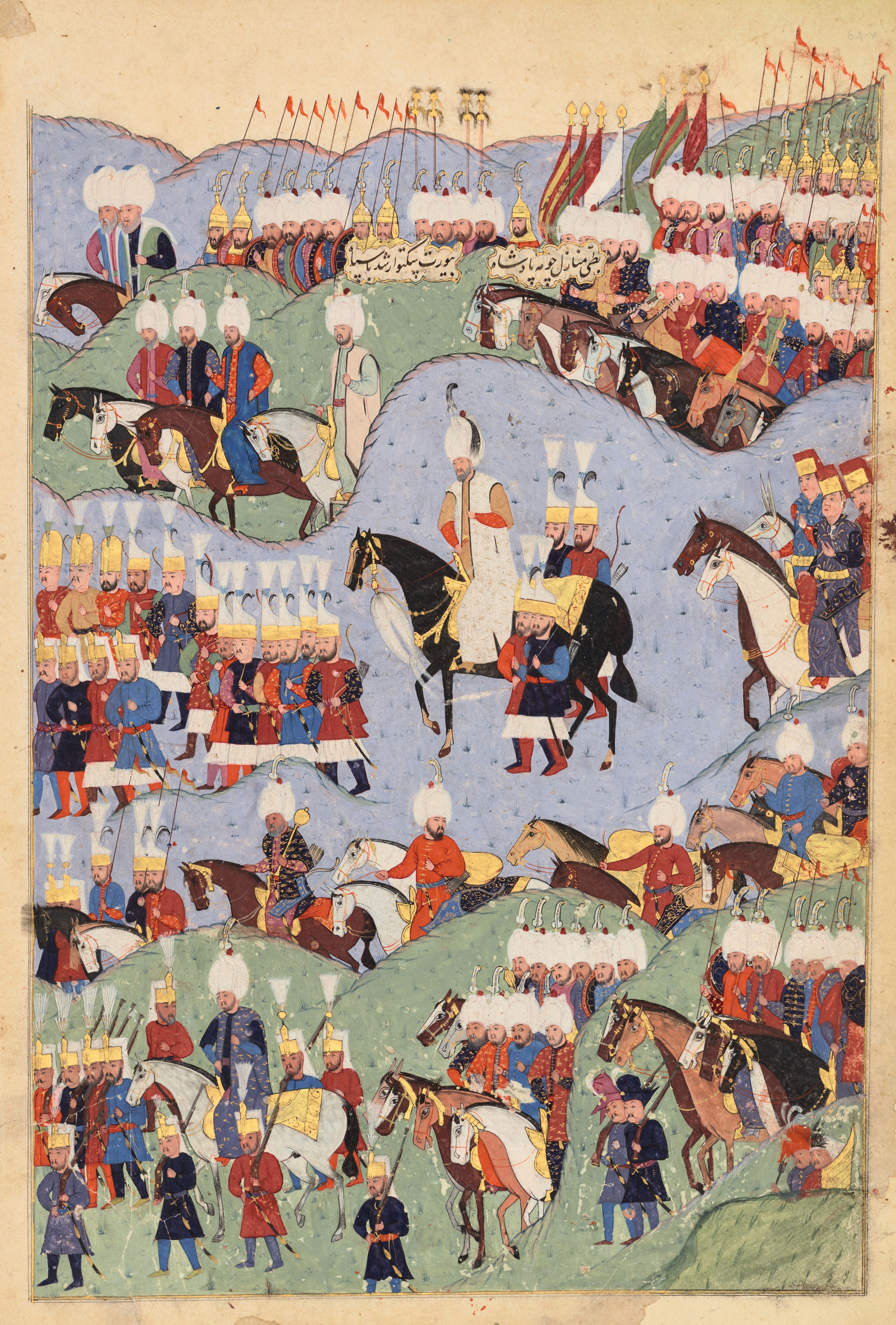
The Ottoman army arrives at Szigetvar. History of Sultan Süleyman, 1576 (Chester Beatty, T. 413)

For the siege and campaign, soldiers were mobilized from the Hungarian and Balkan provinces administered by the beylerbey of Timișoara. Royal decrees ordering mobilisation were dispatched to multiple beylerbeys in November 1565. (Note: Orders were sent to the beylerbey of Rumelia Eyalet on 15 November, to the beylerbey of Anatolia Eyalet on 16 November and to the beylerbey of Karaman Eyalet on 25 November.) The Ottoman government of the Sublime Porte fed wrong information to Habsburg envoys in order to mislead them about the targets and status of the campaign. Suleiman and his army set out for the campaign on 29 April 1566. (Note: The departure had originally been set for 5 April but had to be delayed due to Sultan Suleiman being ill.) The historians Szabolcs Varga and Nicolas Vatin both provide a figure of 50,000 for the size of the Ottoman army. The Ottoman chief military engineer for the siege was Ali Portuk. The Ottomans used at least 17 bacaluşka (basilisk guns), majorly of the 14 and 16 oka caliber, during the siege. The chronicler Mustafa Selaniki noted that 180 – 280 large Darbzen guns had been carried along for the siege.

Şeyh Nureddinzade Muslihiddin, a Sufi of the Khalwati order, along with Sokollu Mehmed Pasha had persuaded Sultan Suleiman to participate in the campaign to discharge his obligation of a last jihad. Many beys and mirzas from the Crimean Khanate, including the Kalga (deputy khan) Mehmed II Giray, participated in the campaign. Because of their absence, the khan Devlet I Giray was unable to pledge an oath on "the whole land" to the Tsardom of Russia.

=== Zrinski ===
To enhance the defenses of the fort of Szigetvár, Zrinski had started collecting taxes from multiple areas in the vicinity after he was made the captain general. His initiative led to the fort becoming very large in size, the construction of small forts overlooking important inner roads and the placement of a swamp around the city. Zrinski's strategy was to hold the towns and thus not provide an opening for an Ottoman attack on the fort.

Scholars agree that Zrinski's army must have numbered around 2,300 Croatian and Hungarian soldiers, and 2,000 civilians. These troops consisted of his personal forces, and those of his friends and allies, namely Count Gašpar Alapić and the lieutenants Miklouš Kobak, Petar Patačić and Vuk Papratović. (Note: The other members of Zrinski's troops who fell during the siege were voivodes like Lovrenac, Martin Bošnjak, Petar Botoš, Petar Bata, Jurij Matijaš, Sekćidi Matijaš, Radovan, Dando Ferenac, Ivan Novaković, and Lovrinac Juranić. In Samuel Budina's 1568 Latin translation is also mentioned Blaž Diak, while in epic literature (particularly the late 17th century Odiljenje sigetsko by Pavao Ritter Vitezović), are mentioned Deli-Vid Žarković and his wife Julijana, Petar Farkašić, Mate and Miloš Badnjaković, Juraj Ćaković, Andrija Gusić, Stipan Oršić, Mikula Sekulić, and Ilija Golem.) Zrinski had sent a letter to the widow of Tamás Nádasdy on 19 April 1566, four months before the siege began, where he said he was going to defend the fort. Zrinski had also written to Maximilian that he would hold Szigetvár long enough that the defenses of Vienna could be strengthened.

== Siege ==
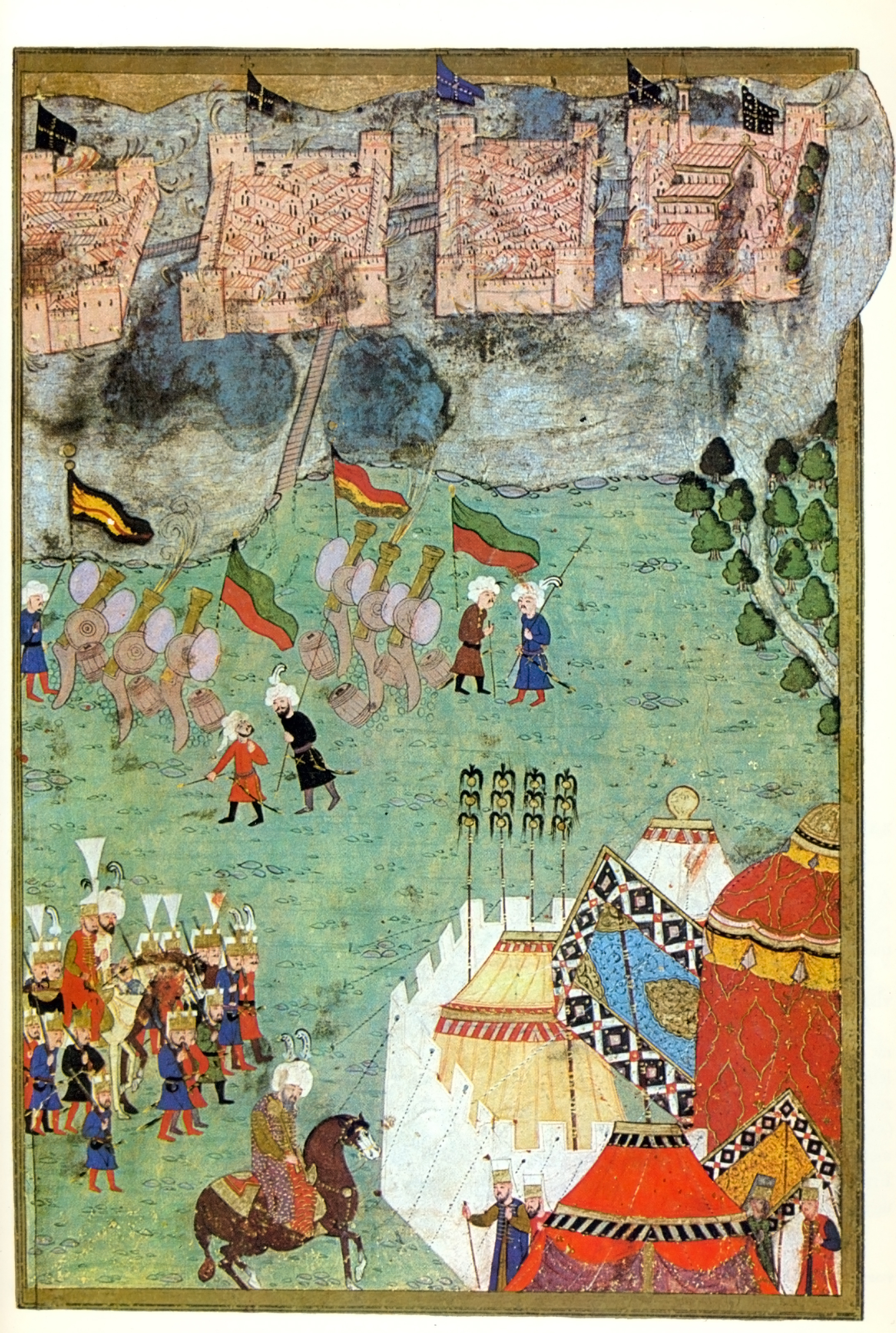
Ottoman miniature showing Szigetvár before the siege, 16th century

The fort's defender, Count Nikola IV Zrinski, was one of the largest landholders in the Kingdom of Croatia, a veteran of border warfare, and a Ban (Croatian royal representative) from 1542 to 1556.

Suleiman's forces reached Belgrade on 27 June after 49 days of marching through Edirne, Plovdiv and Sofia. They constructed a bridge over the Sava river and arrived in Zemun. Here he met with John II Sigismund Zápolya, whom he had earlier promised to make the ruler of all of Hungary. The Ottoman army arrived in Osijek on 12 July and began crossing the Drava river. According to the historian Kenneth Setton, Suleiman had decided to postpone his attack on Eger after learning of Zrinski's success in an attack on an Ottoman encampment at Siklós, and instead attack Zrinski's fortress at Szigetvár in order to neutralise him. The historian Gyula Káldy-Nagy argues that it was the falling water level of the Drava river which led to the attack against Szigetvár and the postponement of the attack on Eger.

Szigetvár was divided by water into three sections: the old town, the new town, and the castle—each of which was linked to the next by bridges and to the land by causeways. Although it was not built on particularly high ground, the inner castle, which occupied much of the area of today's castle, was not directly accessible to the attackers. This was because two other baileys had to be taken and secured before a final assault on the inner castle could be launched.

The Ottoman vanguard arrived near the fort on 1 August 1566. The Ottoman army had surrounded the fort and town by 5 August. Suleiman arrived on 9 August and his war tent was erected on Semlék hill. The Sultan stayed in his camp where he received verbal battle progress reports from Sokollu Mehmed Pasha, his Grand Vizier and the real operational commander of the Ottoman forces.

On 7 August, the preparations for the siege began. Trenches were built, and from behind these lines cannon fire began. The fort's palisades were targeted first instead of the walls in order to make the defenders come out. At night the artillery batteries were put up, and the next day artillery firing on the New Town's walls began. The historian József Kelenik argues that only field guns were used for this effort, and that the long-range siege guns were used only to bombard the fort. On 9 August, a battery of five guns began firing at the tower in the inner fort and destroyed its top level, because the tower had afforded full view of the Ottoman movements.

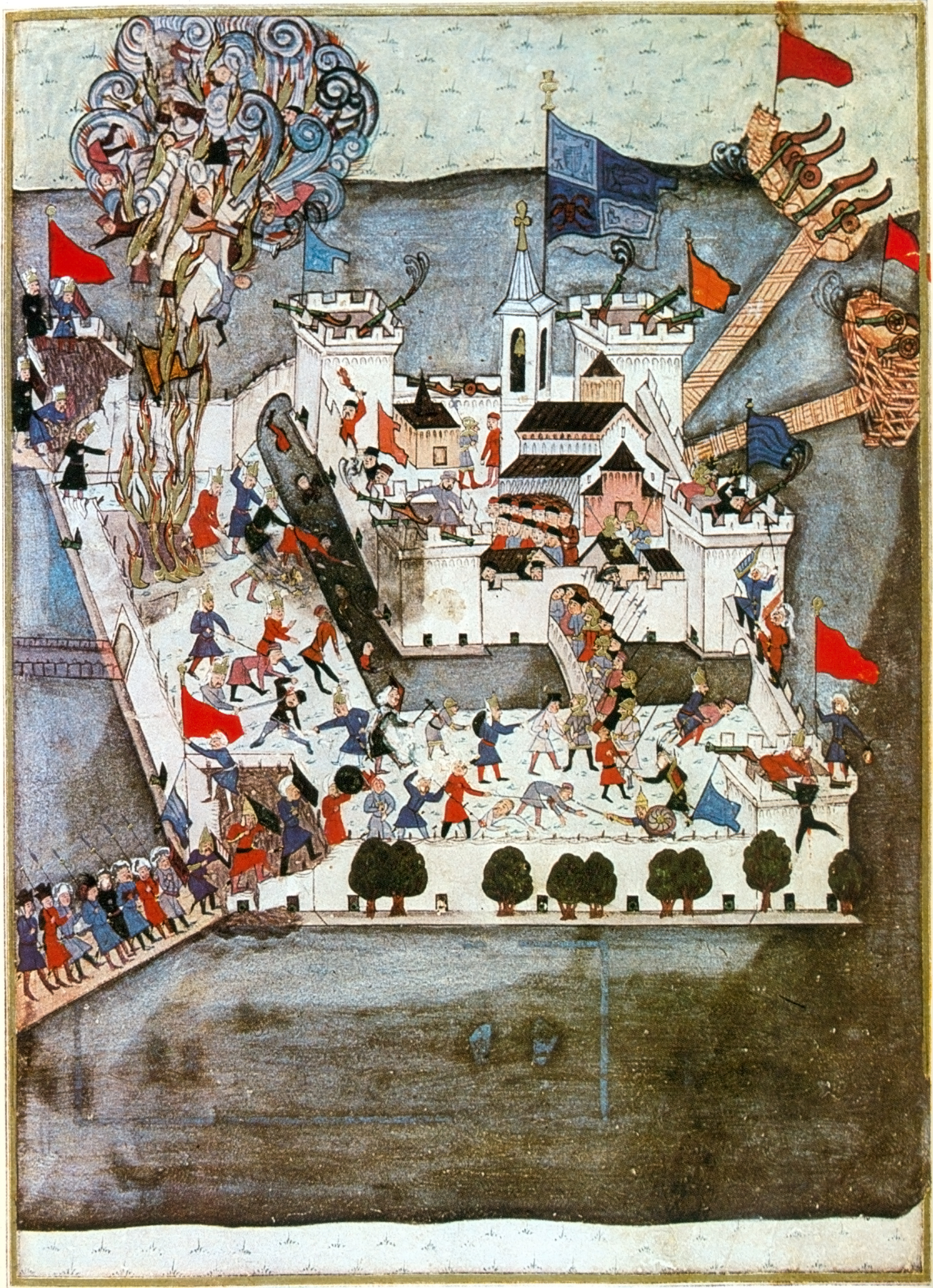
A miniature showing the siege of Szigetvár, 16th century

Bombardment of the New Town and the inner castle continued on 9 August. Trenches and batteries were constructed in an arc stretching from the southeast rampart. The Old Town was surrounded to the east by janissaries who were closing in on the walls, and to the west by a battery near the dam, while more batteries were built to bombard it. Preliminary work was initiated to break open the dam while guarded by 600 janissaries. The defenders retreated from New Town in the evening after incurring much damage from the bombardment.

On 10 August, the Ottomans initiated a large artillery offensive against the fort. Ottoman artillery began firing on its two southern parapets, meanwhile, the Old Town was fired upon by four or five batteries. Zrinski and his subordinates disagreed on what course to follow next. Zrinski intended to withdraw from the Old Town, but his subordinates wanted to hold onto it. Zrinski decided to keep holding the town because it would provide more time for the defenders and because evacuating 4,000 people from the town to the fort would be tough.

On 19 August, long sections of the Old Town's walls had collapsed. The defenders began retreating but were attacked by the Ottomans at the entrance of the fort's bridge, and the former lost many of their officers during the fighting. The bulwarks on the southwest and southeast parts of the fort had been under bombardment continuously for ten days, but had not broken, primarily due to the long distance from and constrained angle of fire of the batteries. An additional two batteries were deployed in the Old Town to the south of the fort, where they targeted the weakest and least defensible portions of the bastions. The cross beams of these structures were more vulnerable to bombardment and crumbled quickly.

Zrinski, advised by his experienced commanders, ordered 200 of his cavalry to prevent the Ottomans from draining the swamp surrounding the fort complex. This initiative failed; other ideas advanced by Zrinski's subordinates in the first two weeks of the siege also ended in failure. After the demise of his lieutenants and the Ottomans taking the towns, Zrinski commandeered the resistance himself.

The fort's walls were partly breached at the Hegy (lit. 'Mountain') Bastion, which was the one nearest to the Ottoman cannons. A bigger portion of the walls collapsed six days after the Old Town was taken by the Ottomans. The Ottoman commanders determined that this was the time to mount their first infantry attack. On 26 August, they launched the attack but failed and suffered high losses. The purpose of this attack probably was to expand the breaches they had made by digging through them into the fort walls. On 29 August, the Ottomans initiated another attack to decisively defeat the defenders; however, the attack failed and 4,000 Ottoman soldiers died.

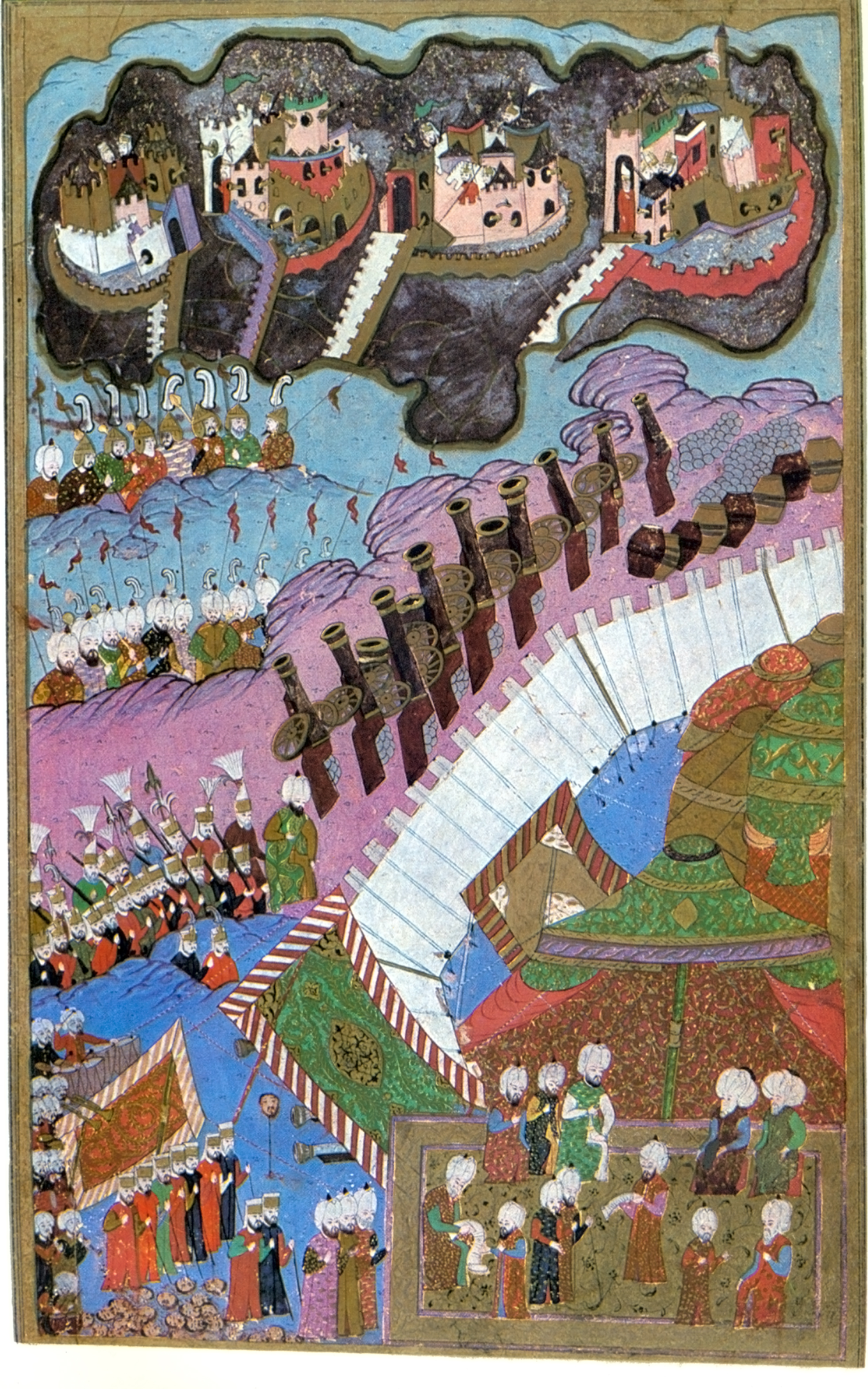
A miniature showing an Ottoman council meeting after the conquest of Szigetvár, 16th century

During the following days, the Ottomans suffered great losses due to the spread of dysentery, which also might have infected Sultan Suleiman. The defenders had sent multiple letters to Emperor Maximilian requesting aid and the lifting of the siege, but the Emperor and his army did not move from their camp. The Emperor, till the end of the siege, was tricked by the Sultan and Grand Vizier into believing that the Ottomans' actual target was Vienna.

After the infantry attacks, the besiegers' cannons began firing at the Nádasdy Bastion in the northeastern part of the fort. Also, siege embankments were raised against the southwestern and southeastern ramparts. Portuk died during the final phase of the siege. On 2 September, taking advantage of the nighttime darkness, the Ottomans fully breached the walls facing the Hegy Bastion, which had the best cannons in the fort. The janissaries placed inflammable substances in an opening they had mined into the Hegy Bastion. On 5 September, they lit the opening on fire using gunpowder. The fire expanded to the other buildings in the fort, and it could not be put out due to strong winds and the constant bombardment of the bastion's vicinity.

Zrinski was at the Nádasdy Bastion and had held out against two attacks there. He retreated to the inner fort, but much of the other troops on the outer fort could not, and the latter was taken by the Ottomans on 5 September. Suleiman had offered Zrinski the opportunity to rule all of Croatia if he surrendered, but Zrinski refused. The fall of the castle appeared inevitable but the Ottoman high command hesitated. On 6 September, Suleiman died in his tent. His death was kept secret for 48 days with great effort, with only the Sultan's innermost circle knowing of his demise. This was because the Ottomans feared that their soldiers would give up the battle if they knew that their leader had died. A courier was dispatched from the camp with a message for Suleiman's successor, Selim II.

=== Final battle ===
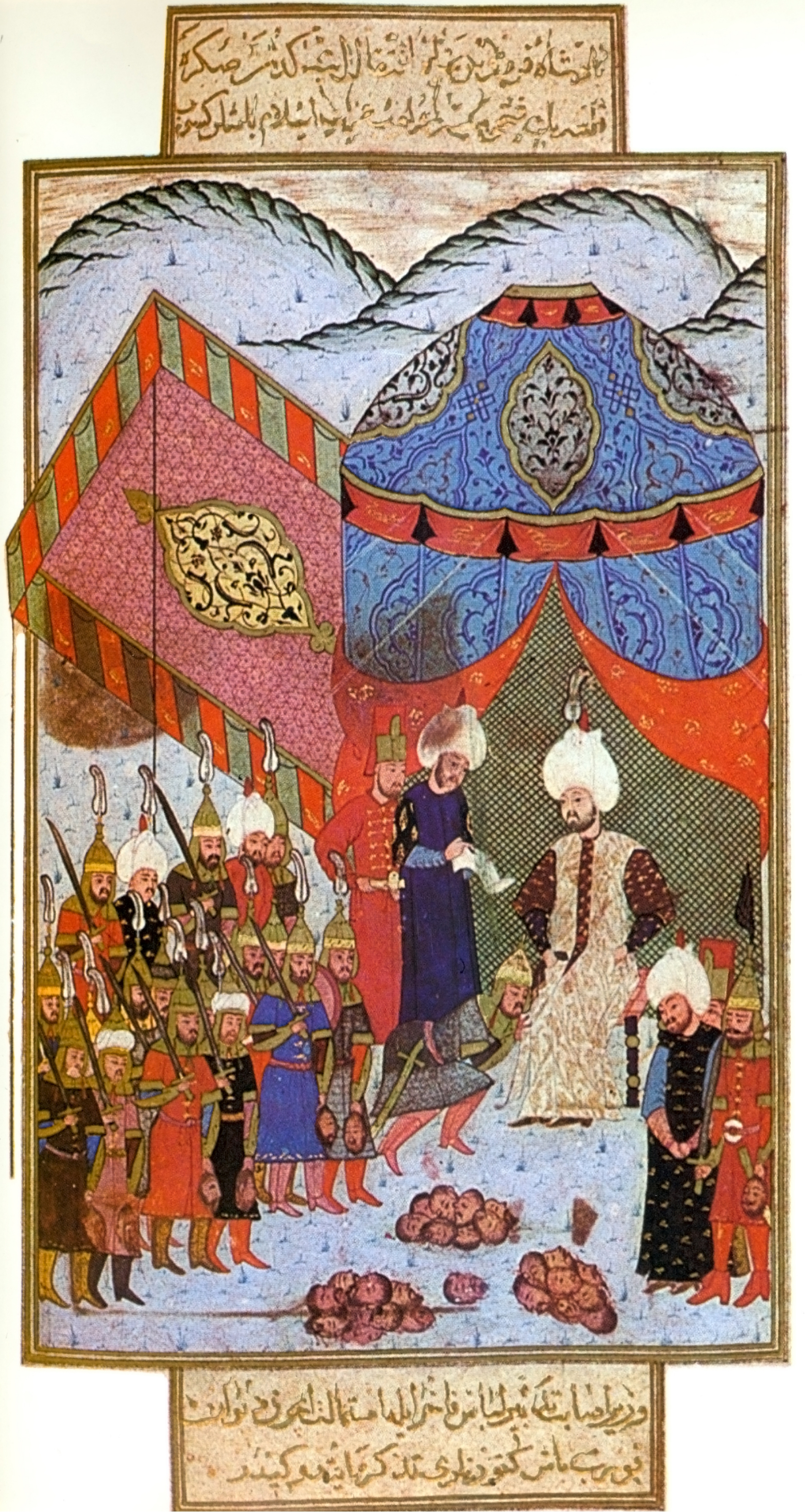
A miniature showing the decapitated heads of enemies after the siege. Nüzhet-i Esrâr, 1568-69

The final battle began on 7 September, the day after Suleiman's demise. The Ottoman army swarmed through the city, drumming and yelling. Zrinski then ordered a charge and led his remaining 600 troops out of the castle. (Note: The historian Micheal Clodfelter says Zrinski led 150 men during the final battle.) At the bridge of the inner castle, he died from bullets fired by the janissaries.

Before leading the final sortie out of the castle garrison, Zrinski had ordered that the fuse of the powder magazine was to be lit. After cutting down the last of the defenders, the besiegers entered the third fort of the fort complex and fell into the booby trap. The Vizier and his mounted officers had just enough time to escape but 3,000 Ottoman soldiers died due to the explosion.

Almost all of Zrinski's garrison died during the siege, while total Ottoman casualties have been estimated at around 20,000–30,000. Zrinski's corpse was beheaded, and it was believed that his head was sent by Mehmed Pasha to either Sokullu Mustafa, the Pasha of Budin, or to the new Sultan Selim II. However, Zrinski's head had actually been sent by Sokollu Mehmed Pasha to a camp in Győr. There, his son-in-law Boldizsár Batthyány took it so it could be buried by Zrinski's son Juraj IV Zrinski and the noble Ferenc Tahy in September 1566 at the Pauline monastery in Sveta Jelena near Šenkovec, Croatia.

== Aftermath ==
The historian Stanko Guldescu argues that cross border raids in Croatia had continued after the siege, and these had led to the Croatian–Slovene Peasant Revolt. Idris Karačović, a servant of Nikola Zrinski, was taken prisoner after the siege and went on to serve as an Ottoman beylerbey, sanjakbey and pasha.

Ottoman expansion into Hungarian and Croatian lands after the battle of Szigetvár (map at the beginning of 1576)

After the battle, the Grand Vizier forged bulletins in the Sultan's name, proclaiming victory. His death meant that any advances in Europe were postponed, as the Grand Vizier had to return to Constantinople for the succession of the new Sultan, Selim II. Even if Suleiman had lived, his army could not have achieved much in the short period between the fall of Szigetvár and the onset of winter. The prolonged resistance at Szigetvár delayed the Ottoman push towards Vienna.

Two ambassadors were sent by Emperor Maximilian: the Croatian Antun Vrančić and the Styrian Christoph van Teuffenbach. They arrived in Istanbul on 26 August 1567 and were well received by Sultan Selim II. An agreement ending the war between the Austrian and Ottoman empires was reached on 17 February 1568, after five months of negotiations with Sokollu Mehmed Pasha. The Treaty of Adrianople was signed on 21 February 1568. Sultan Selim II agreed to an eight-year truce, and the agreement brought 25 years of (relative) peace between the Empires until the Long War began between them. The truce was conditional and Maximilian agreed to pay an annual tribute of 30,000 ducats.

== Legacy and accounts ==
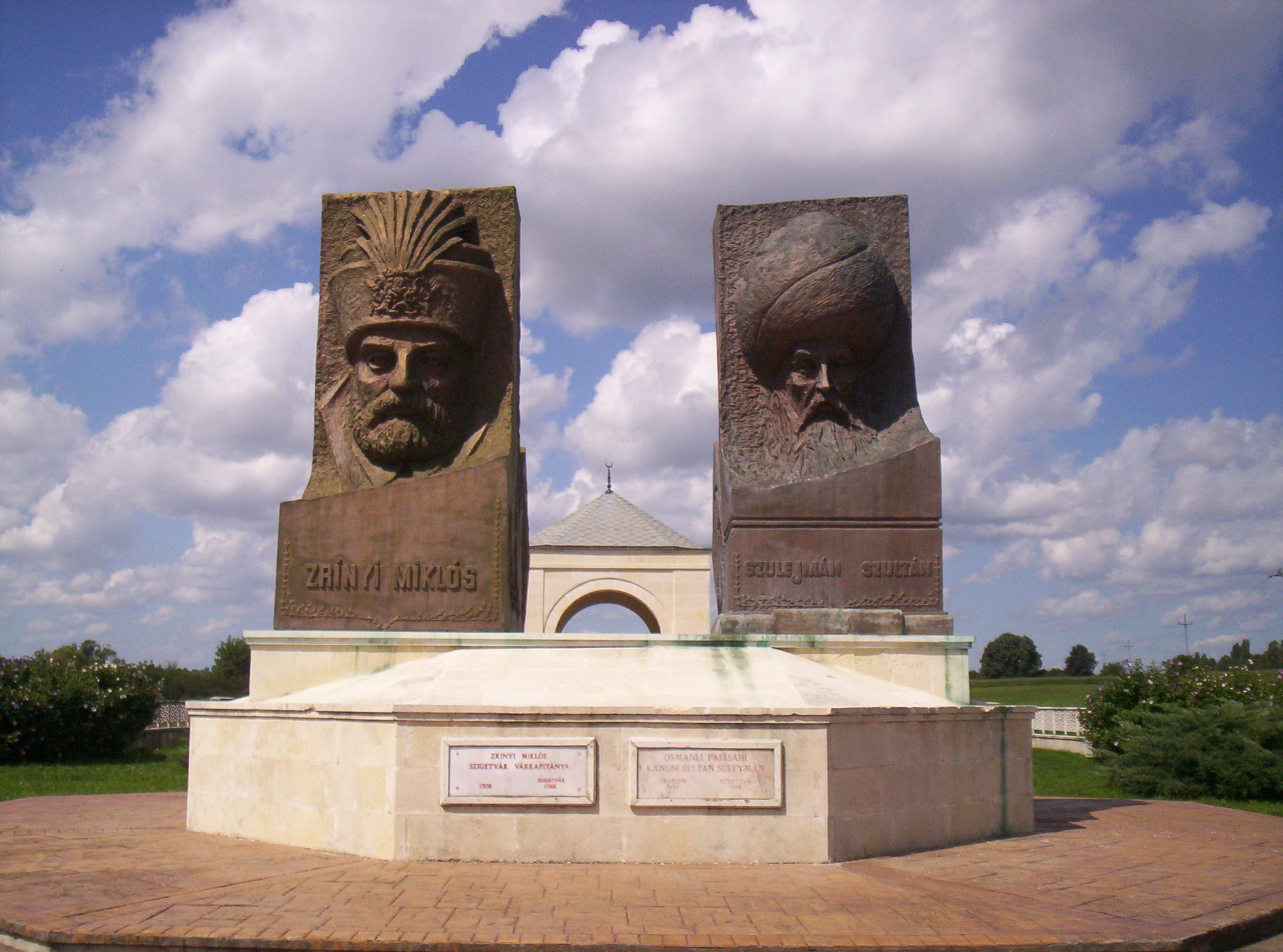
Bust sculptures of Nikola IV Zrinski (left) and Sultan Suleiman (right) at the Hungarian-Turkish Friendship Park in Szigetvár

=== In Europe ===
The siege has been noted as being formative for Hungarian and Croatian national identities.

A first-hand report by Franjo (Ferenc) Črnko, Zrinski's chamberlain and a survivor of the siege, was translated into Latin in 1568, being influential for inspiring epic literature about the siege. The first such work was the De capto Zygetho historia (History of the capture of Sziget) written by Christian Schesaeus in 1571. Another such work was written by the Croatian Renaissance poet and writer Brne Karnarutić, who wrote The Conquest of the City of Sziget (Vazetje Sigeta grada) sometime before 1573. The long poem Pjesma o Sigetu (Song on Siget) from the Cerkvena pesmarica (Church songbook), written in the Kajkavian dialect of Croatian, is dated to the late 16th or early 17th century.

The battle was also chronicled in the Hungarian epic poem Szigeti Veszedelem ("Peril of Sziget", 1651), written in fifteen parts by Zrinski's great-grandson Nicholas VII of Zrin. Petar Zrinski, the brother of Nicholas VII of Zrin, published the Opsida Sigecka (Siege of Siget) in 1660 in Croatian. Another Croatian poet, Pavao Ritter Vitezović, wrote about the battle in his poem Odiljenje sigetsko ("The Sziget Farewell"), first published in 1684. Karl Theodor Körner, a German poet, wrote in 1812 a drama titled Zriny about the battle. Ivan Zajc's 1876 opera Nikola Šubić Zrinski is his most famous and popular work in Croatia.

=== In Turkey ===
Szigetvár is intertwined with Sultan Suleiman in both Ottoman and Turkish memory. The first account of the siege was the Nüzhet-i Esrarü’l-Ahyar der Ahbar-ı Sefer-i Sigetvar (The Pleasant Secrets from the Trip to Sigetvar), published in 1568 by Feridun Ahmed Bey, who had been present in the Ottoman camp at Szigetvár. Agehi Mansur Çelebi, who had also been a participant in the siege, wrote the Fetihname-i Kala-i Sigetvar (The Conquest of the Castle of Sigetvar). The Sigetvar Fetihnamesi (Conquest of Sigetvar), written by Seyfi of Istanbul, is not extant now. Merahi also wrote the Fetihname-i Sigetvar (Conquest of Sigetvar) about the siege in verse. The poet Aşık Çelebi's Sigetvarname (Story of Sigetvar), Mustafa Selaniki's Tarih-i Selâniki (Annals of Selaniki) and multiple other illustrated Sigetvarnames are a few other accounts of the siege.
