= Treaty of Adrianople (1568) =

1568 peace treaty ending the Austrian-Turkish War

Treaty of Adrianople
1568
The 1568 Treaty of Adrianople was made between the Holy Roman Empire and the Ottoman Empire.

The Treaty of Adrianople of 1568 or Treaty of Edirne of 1568, was concluded in the Ottoman city of Adrianople (present-day Edirne), on 17 February 1568, by representatives of Holy Roman Emperor Maximilian II, ruler of Habsburg monarchy and Ottoman Sultan Selim II. It concluded the Ottoman–Habsburg War of 1565–1568 and began a period of 25 years of relative peace between the empires. It followed the siege of Szigetvár, in which the Ottomans took a key Hungarian fortress, but at great cost, including the death of the previous Sultan, Suleiman the Magnificent.

== Negotiations with Sokollu Mehmed Pasha ==
Maximilian's ambassadors, Croatian Antun Vrančić and Styrian Christoph Teuffenbach, had arrived in Constantinople on 26 August 1567. Serious discussions with Sokollu Mehmed Pasha presumably began after the ambassadors' ceremonial audience with Selim II. After five months of negotiations, agreement was reached by 17 February 1568, and the Treaty of Adrianople was signed on 21 February that year, ending the war between the Habsburg monarchy and the Ottoman Empire.

== Bibliography ==
- Setton, Kenneth M. (1984a). The Papacy and the Levant (1204–1571), Volume IV: The Sixteenth Century from Julius III to Pius V. Vol. 4. Philadelphia: The American Philosophical Society. ISBN 0-87169-162-0.
