= Habsburg–Ottoman war of 1565–1568 =

Ottoman war with the Habsburgs in Europe

- Part of Ottoman–Habsburg wars Little War in Hungary
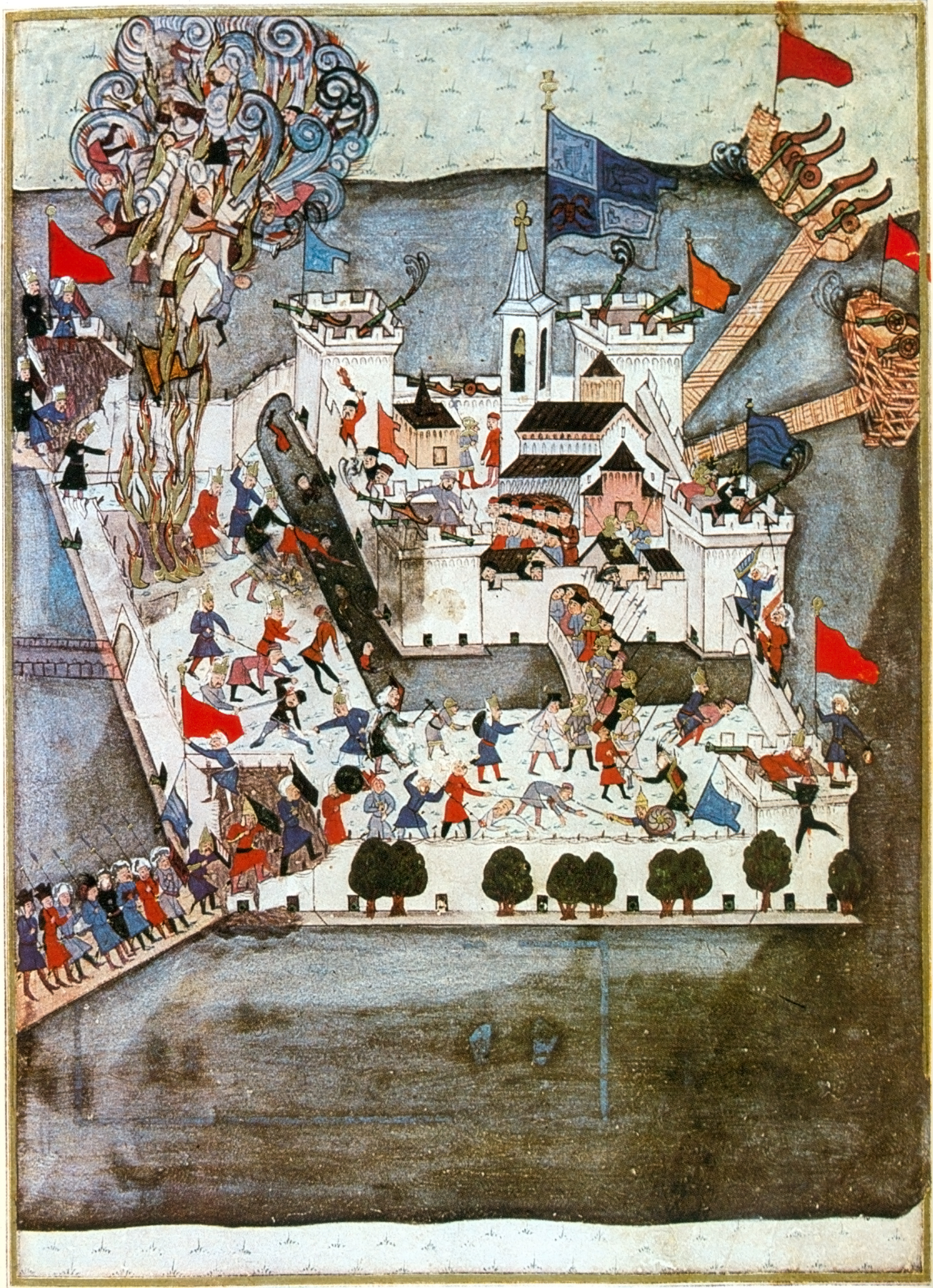
- Siege of Szigetvár in 1566. History of the Szigetvár Campaign (1568-69)
| Date | 1565 – 17 February 1568 |
| Location | Balkans, Kingdom of Hungary |
| Result | Ottoman victory |
| Territorial changes | Ottomans capture Szigetvár |

Belligerents
| Ottoman Empire; Eastern Hungary; Crimean Khanate; Moldavia | Habsburg Monarchy; Holy Roman Empire; Kingdom of Hungary; Kingdom of Croatia |

Commanders and leaders
| Suleiman I John Sigismund Zápolya; Sokollu Mehmed Pasha; Lala Mustafa Pasha | Maximilian II; Lazarus von Schwendi; Nikola IV Zrinski †; Erasmus von Purgstall |

Strength
| 142,000 | 5,000 |

Casualties and losses
| 30,000 | 3,000 |

The Habsburg–Ottoman war of 1565–1568 was a conflict between the Habsburg Empire and the Ottoman Empire fought mainly on the territory of Hungary and Croatia. During the war, the Turks captured the castle at Szigetvár but the death of Sultan Suleiman I forced them to retreat. The war ended in 1568 after the signing of a peace treaty in Edirne, under which both sides retained their territorial gains, and the Habsburgs further pledged to pay tribute of 30,000 forints for their possessions in Hungary to the Turks.

== Background ==
On 29 August 1526 the forces of the Kingdom of Hungary were defeated at the Battle of Mohács by Ottoman forces. Both Hungary and Croatia became disputed territories with claims from both the Habsburg and Ottoman empires. On 1 January 1527, the Croatian nobles convened the Parliament at Cetin and unanimously elected Ferdinand I, Archduke of Austria as their king, and in return for the throne, Ferdinand promised to defend Croatia from Ottoman invasion.

The Siege of Vienna in 1529 was the first attempt by Suleiman the Magnificent to capture the Austrian capital. This siege signalled the pinnacle of Ottoman power and the maximum extent of Ottoman expansion in central Europe. Following Suleiman's unsuccessful siege of Vienna in 1529, Ferdinand launched a counter-attack in 1530 to regain the initiative. Suleiman's response came in 1532 when he led a massive army of over 120,000 troops to besiege Vienna again. Ferdinand withdrew his army, leaving only 700 men with no cannons and a few guns to defend Güns. Suleiman came to join him shortly after the Siege of Güns had started. The city was offered a surrender on favourable terms and, although the offer was rejected, the Ottomans retreated leading to a peace treaty between Ferdinand and Suleiman. John Zápolya was recognized as the King of Hungary by the Habsburgs, although as an Ottoman vassal. In 1537, Ferdinand attacked John's forces at Osijek in violation of the treaty. The siege was a disaster of similar magnitude to that of Mohács, with an Ottoman relief army smashing the Austrians. Rather than attack Vienna again, Suleiman attacked Otranto in southern Italy. At the naval Battle of Preveza in 1538, the Ottomans inflicted another defeat on the Habsburg-led coalition.

A further humiliating defeat was inflicted on the Habsburgs in the 1541 Siege of Buda. In April 1543, Suleiman launched another campaign in Hungary, taking back Bran and other forts and returning much of Hungary to Ottoman control. In August 1543, the Ottomans succeeded in the Siege of Esztergom. Another peace agreement between the Habsburgs and the Ottomans lasted until 1552, when Suleiman decided to attack Eger. The Siege of Eger proved futile, and the Habsburg victory reversed a period of territorial losses in Hungary. Their retention of Eger gave the Austrians good reason to believe that Hungary was still contested ground and the Ottoman campaign in Hungary ended, until its revival in 1566.

== War ==
=== Siege of Krupa (1565) ===
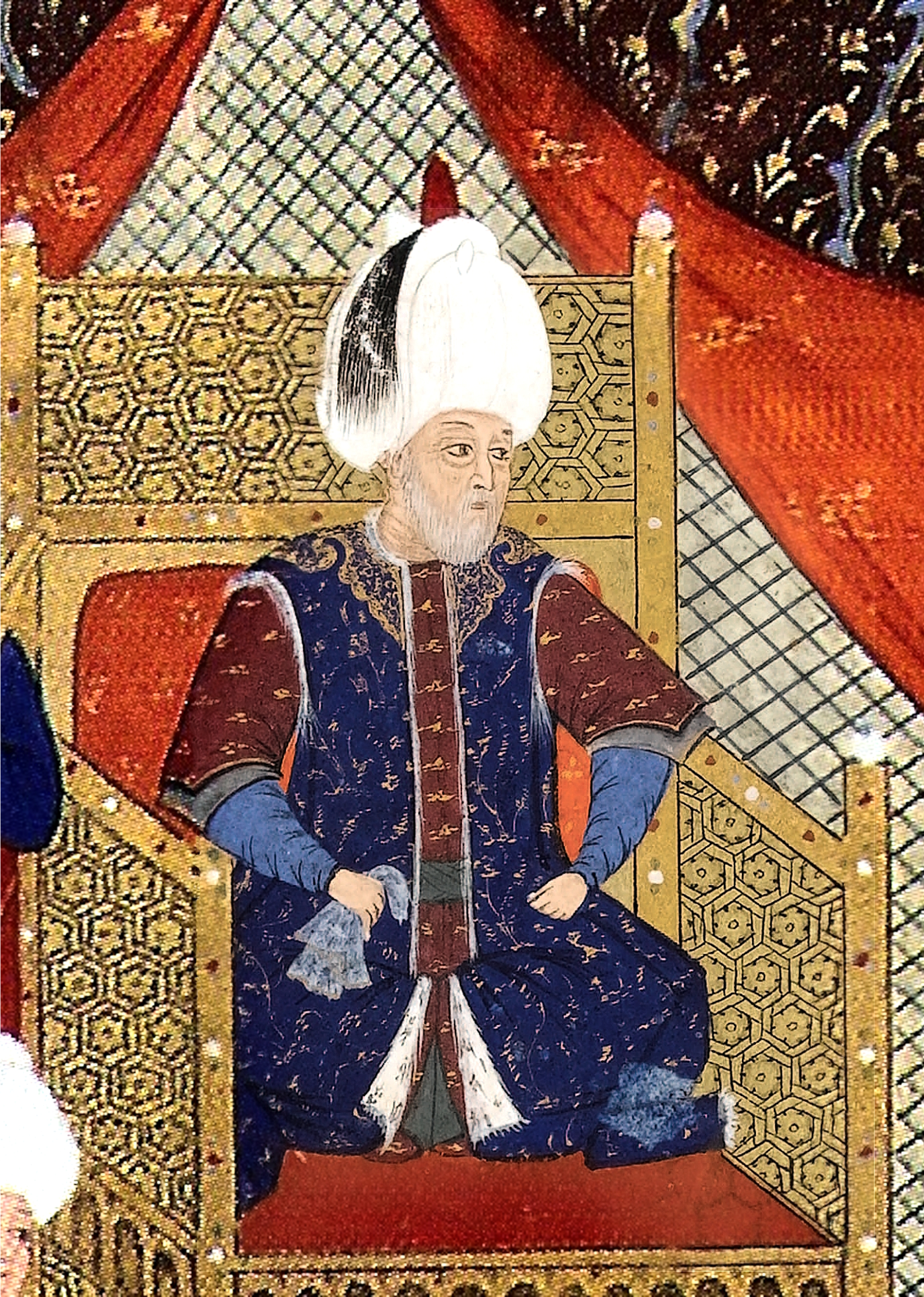
Suleiman I in 1566 at the Siege of Szigetvár. Nüzhet-i Esrâr (1568-69)

At the behest of the grand vizier, Lala Mustafa Pasha, in 1565 invaded the Habsburg territories in Croatia by besieging and seizing the town of Krupa. In November 1565, the pasha of Buda was ordered from Istanbul to prepare an expedition against the Austrians. On the third of May 1566, Sultan Suleiman set out from Istanbul towards the Balkans, as it was to turn out, for his already final military campaign. Suleiman's army numbered about 100,000 troops, but not including servants only 45,000 were fit for battle.

=== Sieges of Gyula and Palota (1566) ===
Upon learning of the approaching Ottoman army, Emperor Maximilian II began collecting taxes from his subjects in order to create an army that was initially planned to consist of 100,000 soldiers. However, the Turks were not idle and when Maximilian was waiting for the arrival of troops from various corners of his empire, there was an attack from the Turkish side on the town of Gyula located in Hungary. On June 6, the Pasha of Buda launched an offensive, besieging the castle in Palota. The defenders of Palota received 100 Hungarian riflemen from Pápa and Győr castles. With them, the number of the defenders of Palota was still just 450 men. The rest of the reinforcing army was gathering near Pápa castle. The widow of Tamás Nádasdy sent there 200 Hussars and 600 infantrymen, Ferenc Batthyány gave 100 Hussars and 300 Hajduk soldiers but the noblemen of the region were also called to arms. The garrison of Pápa castle joined them, led by Ferenc Török and Kristóf Nádasdy. Altogether 10,000 soldiers came together to relieve Palota Castle. György Thury asked Emperor Maximilian for help, Maximilian promised to send 2,000 soldiers.

On June 5, a Turkish army of between 8,000-10,000 troops arrived at Palota. The Turks immediately laid siege to the castle, the fighting was fierce, however, on June 15, upon hearing of the approaching Habsburg reinforcements, the Turks lifted the siege and withdrew, giving the castles in Veszprem and Tata to the Austrians. On July 12, the castle in Gyula was finally conquered by the Turkish army.

=== Battle of Siklós (1566) ===
At the same time when the Turkish troops captured Gyula, Sultan Suleiman arrived in Belgrade and directed his expedition to the north towards the strategic city of Eger. Suleiman sent small units towards the western border whose task was to harass the enemy, but one of Suleiman's units was defeated by Habsburg troops near the town of Siklós by Nikola IV Zrinski, which angered the Sultan extremely, so he decided to return to the west to avenge the defeat. Zrinski's army decided to retreat and strategically barricade themselves in the castle of Szigetvár.

=== Siege of Szigetvár (1566) ===
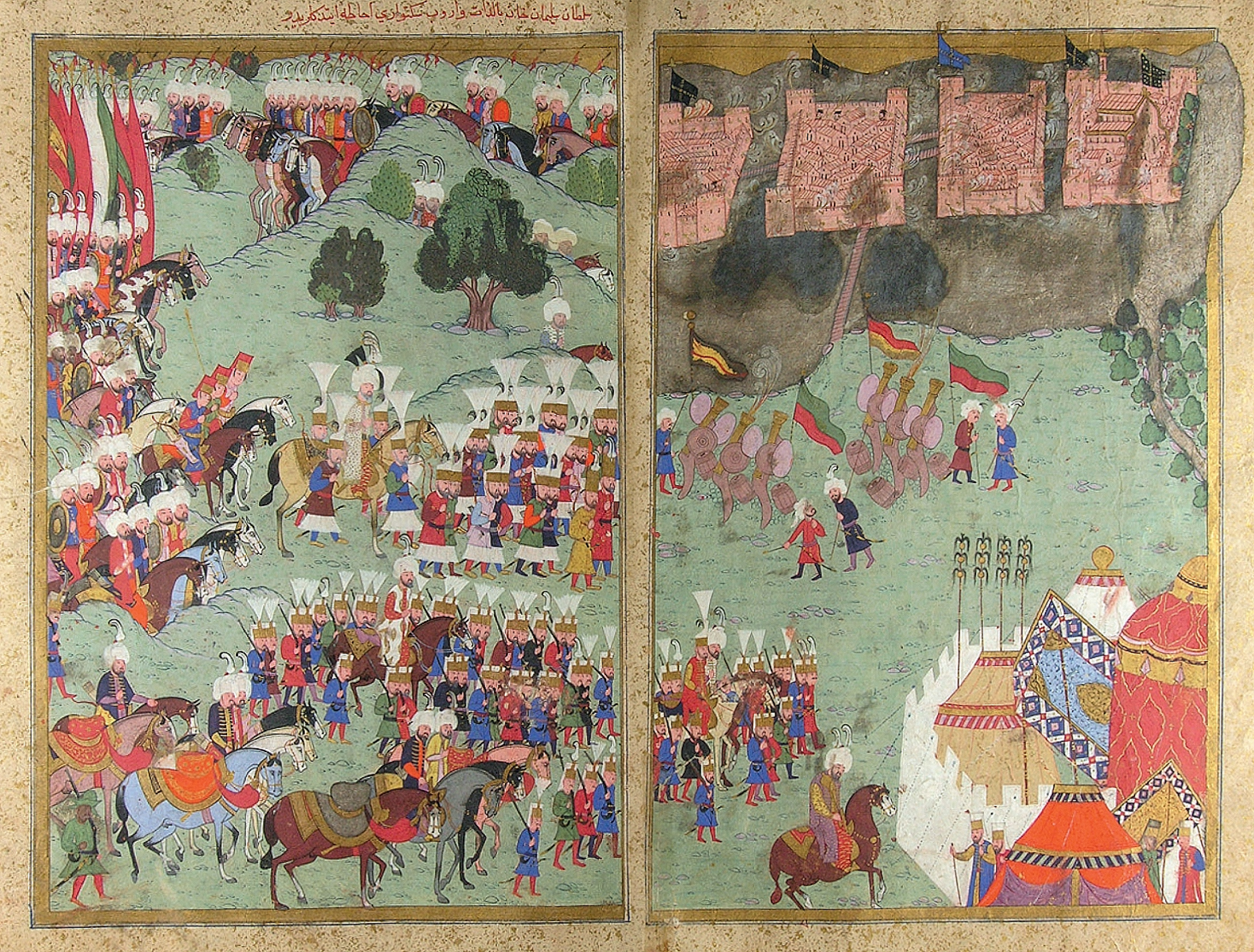
Süleyman and his army reach Szigetvár. Hünername

On August 2, the Ottoman army reached Szigetvar and immediately began building a siege camp. While the Turkish army was busy preparing the camp, the army of the Szigetvár garrison under Nikola Zrinski made a successful raid on the Ottomans, inflicting heavy losses on them. On August 5, Suleiman's entire army gathered at Szigetvar, but he was unable to command the siege due to his age - he was already 72, so he handed the command over to his trusted Sokollu Mehmed Pasha.

The Ottoman army was huge, according to sources, it had 100,000 troops, including 80,000 Ottoman regular troops, 13,000 Crimean Tatars and 7,000 Moldovans, in addition, the Turks had 300 cannons. Szigetvar was defended by only 3,000 Hungarians and Croats, so the difference was gigantic. The defenders of Szigetvár decided to blow up the bridges, as the castle was almost completely surrounded by water. So the Turks decided to fire artillery, sporadically sending Janissary infantry towards the castle gates. During one of the Janissaries' attacks, the defenders, additionally harassed by artillery, were forced to retreat to the old city. The Ottomans soon afterwards attacked the old city. The bloody battle lasted ten days. It caused the Ottomans huge losses. However, on August 19, they finally broke through to the old city. Nikola Zrinski, in a heroic battle, had to retreat to the citadel of Szigetvár, which was the last outpost of defense. The Turks, not wanting to expose their troops to further losses, sent Nikola Zrinski an offer of peace under which Nikola was to surrender and in return become governor of Croatia, Nikola did not agree to these terms and the Turks laid siege to the citadel.

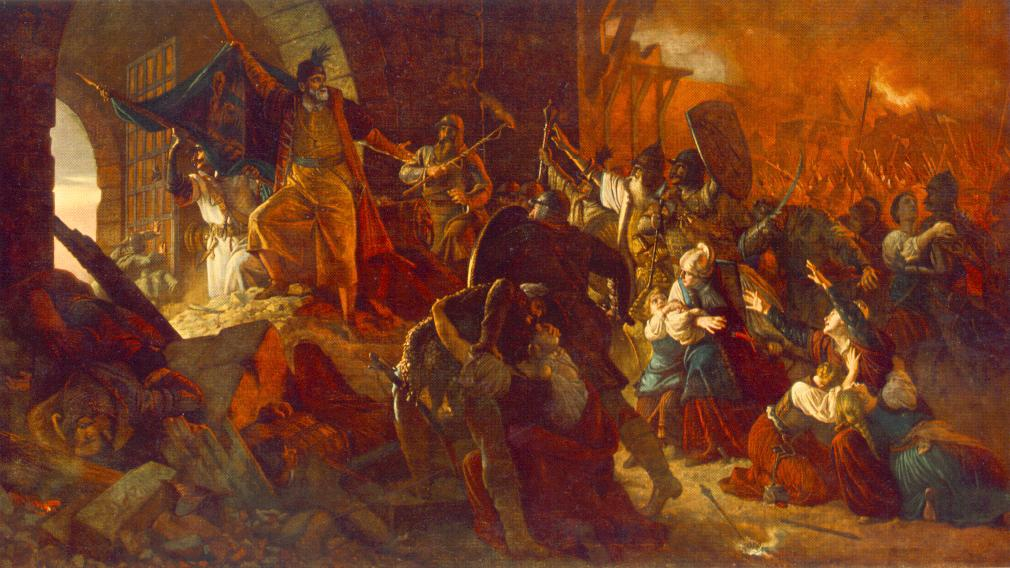
Nikola IV Zrinski during the siege of Szigetvar

On September 6, Sultan Suleiman died in the Turkish camp. Sokollu Mehmed Pasha, knowing that the news could drastically lower the morale of the troops, kept the information about Suleiman's death in secret. On September 8 Nikola Zrinski gave the Turks the final battle, the Szigetvár garrison fought valiantly but was unable to defeat such a large Ottoman army. Zrinski and almost all the defenders died in the heroic battle, only 7 soldiers managed to escape. After capturing the citadel, the Turks rushed in for the loot, there was an unexpected explosion of gunpowder in the citadel which claimed the lives of many Janissaries.

After capturing Szigetvar, the Ottoman army retreated toward Istanbul, the Habsburg army that had concentrated near Győr, however, decided not to go on the offensive.

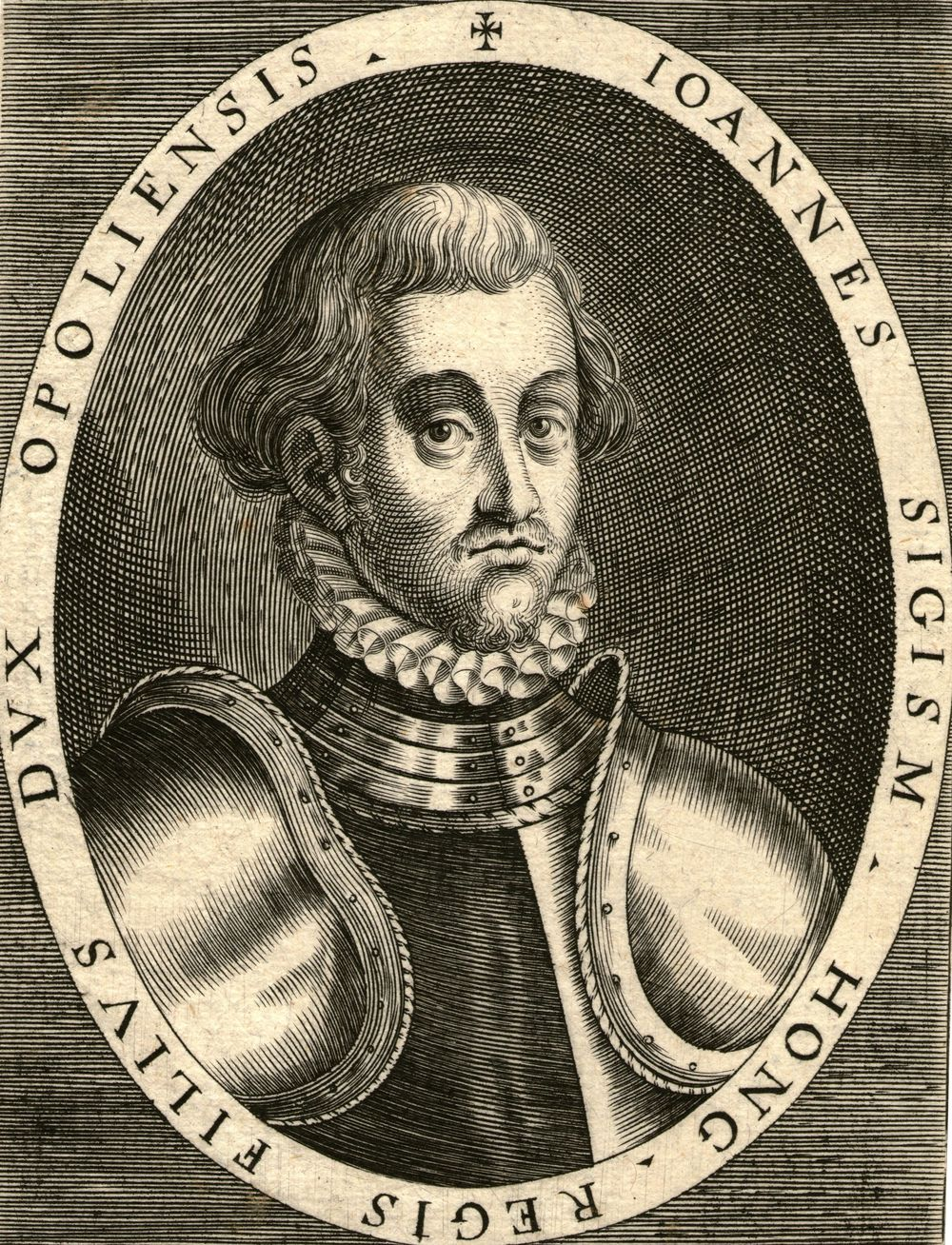
John Sigismund Zapolya

=== Further campaigns (1567) ===
In the middle of March of 1567 Hasan Pasha of Temesvár and his 5,000 men, many Crimean Tatars among them, hurried to help the Transylvanian Prince John Sigismund Zápolya, the son of the Hungarian King John Zápolya. The reason for the conflict was that, a soldier called Lazarus von Schwendi, the Chief Captain of Kassa had marched out and taken some debated lands on the Borderland between Royal Hungary and Transylvania. Schwendi stayed in Kassa because of the Pasha’s attack and let the Tatars destroy the land as they wished, collecting more than 40,000 slaves. Their ally, the Prince of Transylvania, John Sigismund bought these slaves back from Böszörmény. Hasan Pasha took the castles of Dédes and Putnok, which belonged to Lord Péter Perényi, who was siding with the Habsburgs. Then, he broke into Gömör county. Another one of his units raided Monok, Iváncsa and Felsővadász which were domains of the Rákóczi family. The defenders of the small Castle of Felsővadász fought valiantly but the Turks set the roof of their fort on fire. They sallied out from the top of the hill, they were just a handful of warriors but they all fell like the heroes of Szigetvár or Drégely castles before. Only two of them could escape.

According to the contemporary records, this campaign of Hasan Pasha of Temesvár has brought about really great damage and destruction, 12,000 people were herded into slavery.

=== Treaty of Edirne (1568) ===
After the fall of Szigetvár castle in 1566, peace had to be made between the Habsburgs and the Ottomans. Although Szigetvár, this strategic Borderland castle of Hungary was lost, the Turks paid a huge price for it, at least 20,000 Ottoman soldiers perished during the siege. With the fall of Szigetvár castle, Baranya County was completely lost to the enemy.

It was the Habsburgs that sent envoys to the sultan to plead for peace in the summer of 1567. The talks began in Edirne. Emperor Maximilian II wanted a truce for 10 years but Sultan Selim II was willing to agree to an 8-year peace. However, he remarked that the treaty could be renewed after the expiration date. The negotiations lasted for more than six months. Also, the Treaty guaranteed the safety of their subjects and granted them the freedom to move. The trade with slaves and prisoners of war was banned, too. Envoys were supposed to travel unhurt. Certain lands, castles, towns, and villages belonging to Transylvania could be bartered with lands and settlements belonging to the Ottoman Occupied Lands, mainly on the border. On top of these, the Habsburgs were obliged to pay an annual tax of 30,000 Hungarian gold Forints to the sultan.

== Aftermath ==
The Treaty of Edirne marked the end of the period of the so-called Little Wars in Hungary between the Ottomans and the Habsburgs. There was a relatively peaceful period when military actions were limited and sieges with artillery were not allowed. Yet, guerrilla warfare was raging all the same on the Borderland, the Ottomans were softening up the castle chain, as usual, isolating the Borderland castles from their supporting villages by burning and pillaging the countryside. At the same time, the Hungarian Hussars were ambushing them wherever they could.

== See also ==
- Siege of Szigetvar
- Maximilian II
- Suleiman I
- Hasan Pasha of Temesvar
- Nikola IV Zrinski
- Ottoman–Habsburg wars
- Little War in Hungary

== Sources ==
- Elliott, John Huxtable (2000). Europe divided, 1559–1598. Oxford and Cambridge, MA: Wiley-Blackwell. ISBN 978-0-631-21780-0.
- Ágoston, Gábor (2005). Guns for the Sultan: Military Power and the Weapons Industry in the Ottoman Empire. Cambridge and New York: Cambridge University Press. ISBN 9780521843133.
- Clodfelter, Micheal (2017). Warfare and Armed Conflicts: A Statistical Encyclopedia of Casualty and Other Figures, 1492 - 2015, 4th Ed. Jefferson, North Carolina: McFarland. ISBN 9780786474707.
- Guldescu, Stanko (1970). "V. The Siege of Sziget (1566) and the Peasant Revolt of 1573". The Croatian-Slavonian Kingdom: 1526–1792. Studies in European History. Vol. 21. The Hague and Paris: De Gruyter Mouton. pp. 74–85. doi:10.1515/9783110881622.74. ISBN 9789027905369.
