= François Georgeon =

French historian (born 1942)

François Georgeon (born 1942 in Neuilly-sur-Seine) is a French historian specialising in the Ottoman Empire and contemporary Turkey.

== Biography ==
A graduate from the École des Langues Orientales (Inalco), François Georgeon was an assistant in contemporary history at the University of Tunis from 1971 to 1975 and a scientific resident at the French Institute of Anatolian Studies in Istanbul from 1976 to 79. He has been a researcher at CNRS since 1979, and an emeritus research director since 2008. For several years he was director of the Center for Turkish History (UMR 8032, CNRS-EHESS-Collège de France), renamed the "Centre d’études turques, ottomanes, balkaniques et asiatiques" (Cetobac).

== Research ==
François Georgeon's research concerns the end of the Ottoman Empire and the early years of the Republic of Turkey. They cover a rich range of subjects going from sultan Abdülhamid II's biography to cultural history, like alcoholic drinks, the satirical press or the feast of Ramadan. He has been a member of the editorial board of the journal Turcica since 1981 and has conducted many doctoral theses at the EHESS and at Inalco as director of research at the CNRS.

Along with numerous books and articles, he produced the documentary film Le Paris des Jeunes Turcs (45 minutes, 2008, directed by François Georgeon and Philippe Kergraisse). Most of his books and articles have been translated into Turkish. He is currently working on a book on Ramadan (1800-1930).

== Publications ==
- 1980: Aux origines du nationalisme turc : Yusuf Akçura (1876–1935), Paris, éd. ADPF
- 1991: La Turquie au seuil de l'Europe, (codirection with Paul Dumont) Paris, L'Harmattan
- 1992: Villes ottomanes à la fin de l'Empire, (codirection with Paul Dumont) Paris, L'Harmattan
- 1995: Des Ottomans aux Turcs, naissance d'une nation, Istanbul, Isis
- 1997: Vivre ensemble dans l’Empire ottoman. Sociabilités et relations intercommu-nautaires. XVIIIe - XIXe siècles, (codirection with Paul Dumont) Paris, L’Harmattan
- 2000: Ramadan et politique, (codirection with Fariba Adelkhah) Paris, CNRS éditions
- 2003: Abdülhamid II, le sultan calife (1876–1909), Paris, Fayard
- 2007: Enfance et jeunesse dans le monde musulman, (codirection with Klaus Kreiser) Paris, Maisonneuve & Larose
- 2009: Sous le signe des réformes. État et société dans l’Empire ottoman et dans la Turquie kémaliste (1789–1939), Istanbul, Isis
- 2012: Les Ottomans et le temps, (direction of the work) Leyde, E.J. Brill.
- « L’ivresse de la liberté ». La révolution de 1908 dans l’Empire ottoman, (direction of the work) Louvain, Peeters, 2012.
- 2015: Dictionnaire de l’Empire ottoman, (collective work directed with Nicolas Vatin and Gilles Veinstein) Paris, Fayard.
- 2013: Nathalie Clayer and Erdal Kaynar (dir.), Penser, vivre et agir dans l’Empire ottoman. Études réunies pour François Georgeon, Louvain, Peeters.
- 2015: François Georgeon, Nicolas Vatin and Gilles Veinstein, in collaboration with Elisabetta Borromeo, Dictionnaire de l’Empire ottoman, Fayard, 1332 pages.
- 2017: Le mois le plus long. Ramadan à Istanbul, CNRS éditions, 352 p.
