= Foaia Românească =

Romanian newspaper in Hungary

- Type: Weekly newspaper
- Editor-in-chief: Eva Iova Șimon
- Founded: Summer of 1950
- Language: Romanian
- Headquarters: Gyula (1950–1957); Budapest (1957–1971); Gyula (1971–present)
- Country: Hungary

Foaia Românească ("The Romanian Sheet" in Romanian) is a weekly newspaper published in Hungary for the Romanian minority of the country. It was the first newspaper established for the Romanian minority of post-Trianon Hungary and it is the one with the longest and widest level of circulation within the country.

Foaia Românească was founded by the Cultural Union of the Romanians of Hungary in the summer of 1950 and was originally known as Libertatea Noastră ("Our Freedom"). In that year, the newspaper emitted a single issue, resuming its activity on 15 January 1951. At first, the redaction team was located at the teachers' room of the Nicolae Bălcescu Romanian Gymnasium, Primary School and College of the town of Gyula (Romanian: Jula or Giula), and it was mostly composed by teachers. In the end of 1957, the headquarters of the newspaper were moved to Budapest, the newspaper was renamed to Foaia Noastră ("Our Sheet") and most of the redaction team was changed as well. They were returned to Gyula in 1971.

In 1978, the newspaper adopted a regular weekly publication. The new staff attempted to be as close to the readership as possible and get as many subscribers as possible, reaching an all-time high of 1,500 in the mid-80s, with hundreds of these being in Romania. In the 90s, the newspaper introduced some renovations to itself after the fall of the communist regime in Hungary, also being renamed first to Noi, românii din Ungaria ("Us, Romanians of Hungary") and then to Noi, săptămânal al românilor din Ungaria ("Us, the Weekly of the Romanians of Hungary"). In 1998, the newspaper adopted its current title, Foaia Românească. Since the early 2000s, it refers to itself as "the only Romanian-language newspaper focused on the problems of the Romanians of Hungary".

As of 2011, the editor-in-chief of the newspaper was Eva Iova Șimon, also the director of Editura NOI ("US Publishing House") seated in Gyula as well, where she was born on 7 April 1970. She is a recipient of Romania's Order of Cultural Merit.
