= Nüzhet-i Esrâr =

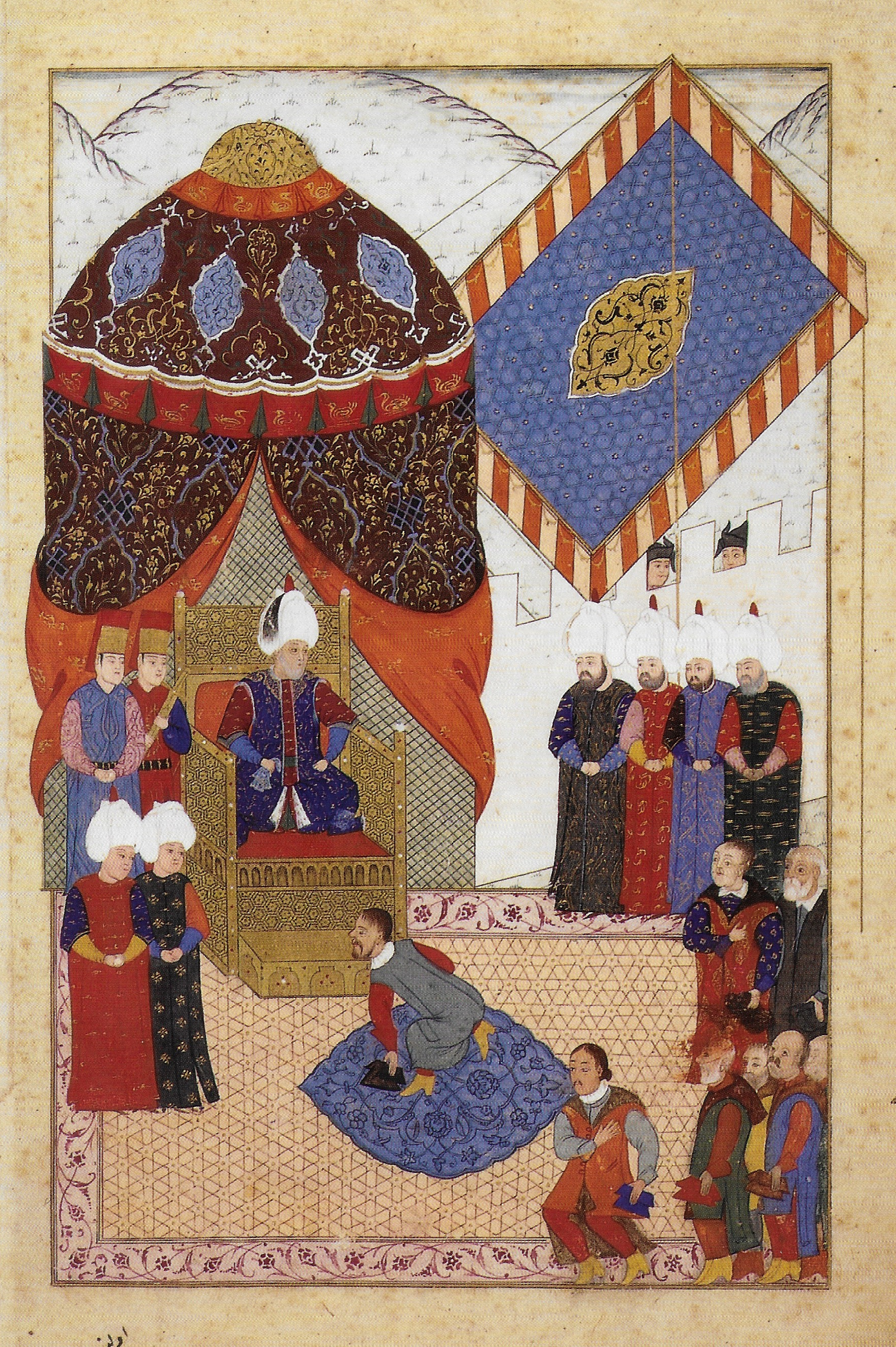
- Suleiman I receiving the Transylvanian prince Janos Zsigmond near the town of Zimony in 1566. Painted by Nakkaş Osman. "History of the Szigetvár Campaign", 1568-69 (TSMK H.1339)
- Author: Feridun Ahmed Bey
- Illustrator: Nakkaş Osman
- Publication date: 1568-1569

The Nüzhet-i Esrâr ("Delight of secrets", short for Nüzhet-i Esrârü’l-Ahyâr der-Ahbâr-ı Sefer-i Sigetvar, "The Delight of the Secrets of the Virtuous, on the Accounts of the Szigetvár Campaign") also Sigetvarname ("History of the Szigetvár Campaign"), Topkapi Sarayí Müzesi, Hazine 1339 (TSMK H.1339), is an Ottoman historical chronicle by Feridun Ahmed Bey, transcribed in 1568/1569 and recounting the event of the Habsburg–Ottoman war of 1565–1568, particularly the Siege of Szigetvár in 1566. The miniatures are attributed to Nakkaş Osman, who accompanied Feridun Ahmed Bey in the Habsburg–Ottoman war of 1565–1568. His renditions of the scenes, and particularly his portraits of Suleiman I are considered among the most realistic and accurate.

The campaign was led by Suleiman I, who died in Szigetvár on this occasion. He was succeeded to the throne by his son Selim II.

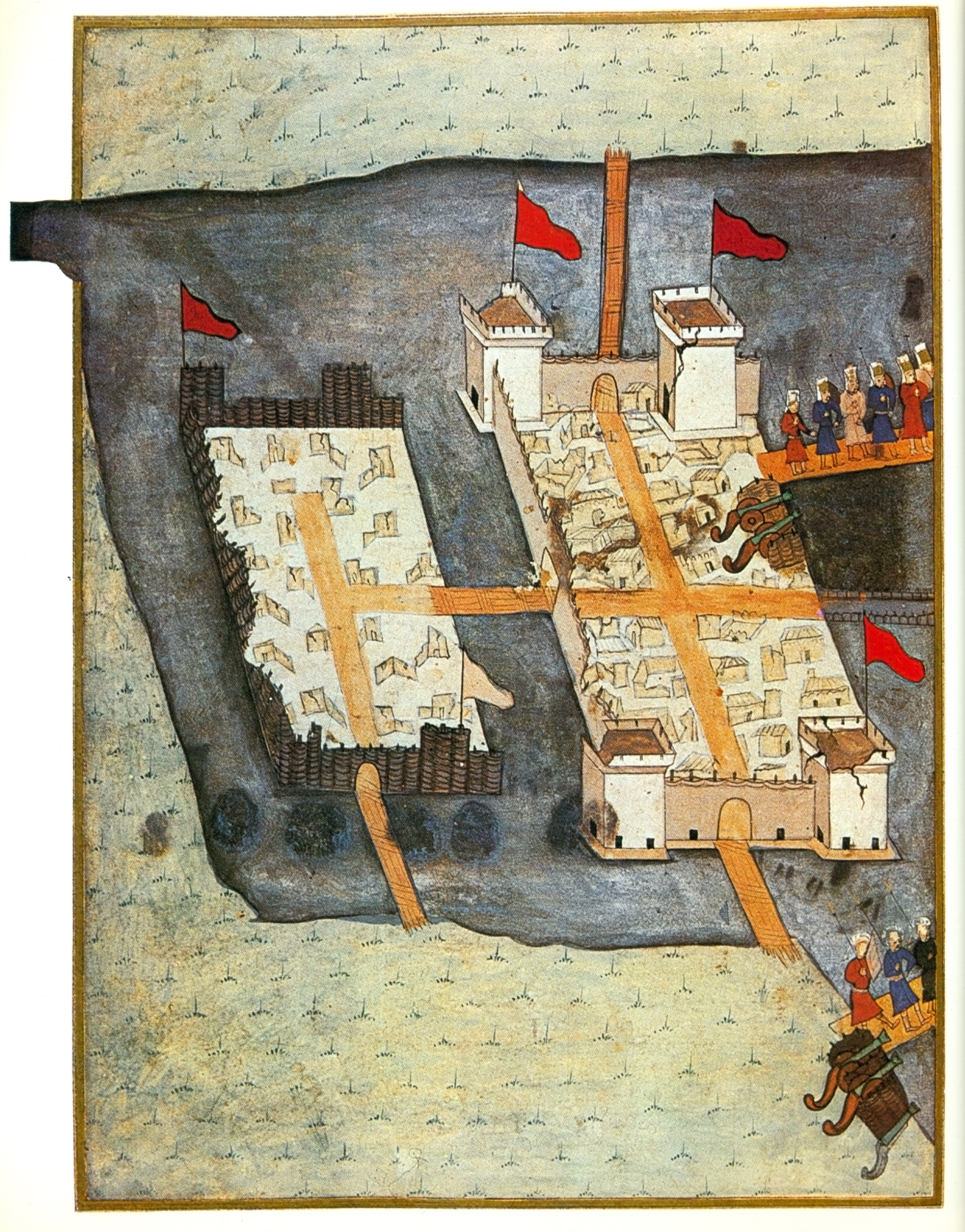
Siege of Szigetvár, 1566

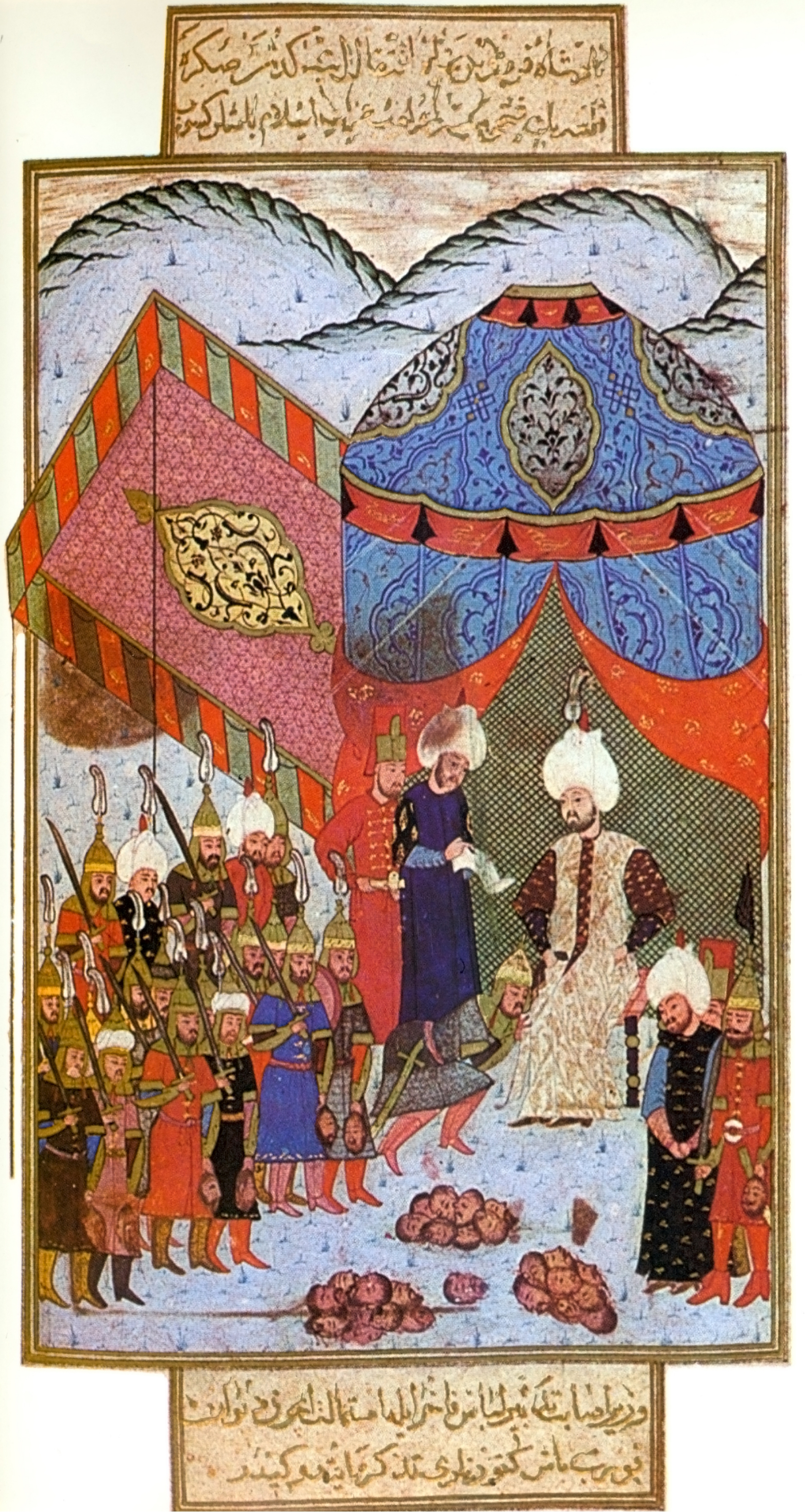
Head of enemies after the siege

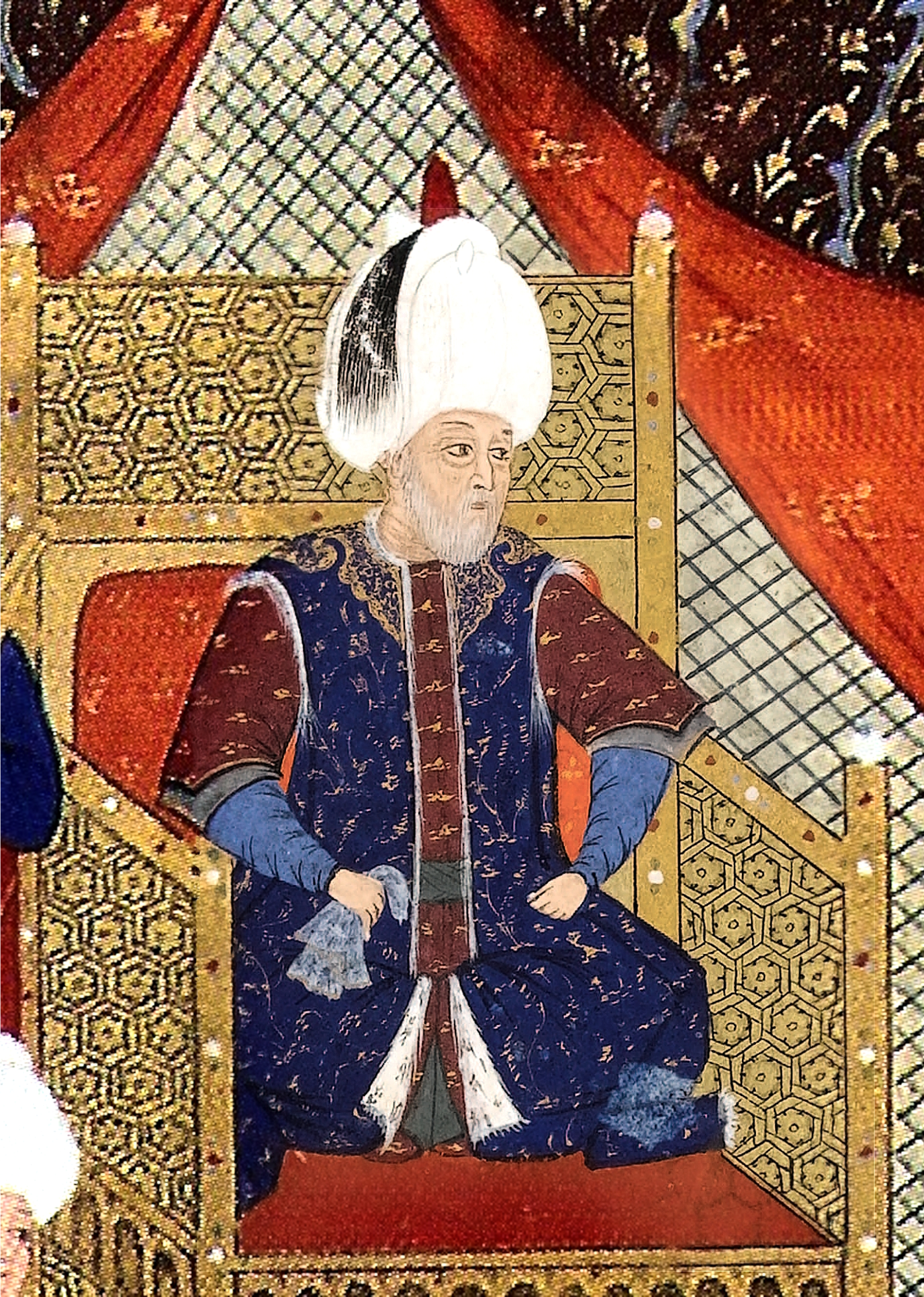
Suleiman I in 1566

== Sources ==
- Roxburgh, David J. (2005). Turks: a journey of a thousand years, 600-1600. London : New York: Royal Academy of Arts ; Distributed in the U.S. and Canada by Harry N. Abrams. ISBN 978-1903973578.
