= Nicolas Vatin =

French epigrapher and historian

Nicolas Vatin is a French epigrapher and historian, specializing in the study of the Ottoman Empire. His brother, François Vatin, is a professor of sociology at the Paris West University Nanterre La Défenser.

== Career ==
After studying at the École normale supérieure, Vatin obtained his agrégation de lettres classiques in 1978. Between 1981 and 1983, Vatin was a resident at the French Institute of Anatolian Studies in Istanbul. As of 2016, Vatin is the director of research at the CNRS and director of studies at the Ecole pratique des hautes études..

Vatin's main research topics are the Ottoman Empire during the 15th-16th centuries, the history of the Eastern Mediterranean, the succession of Ottoman sultans and cemeteries and death with translations and analysis of the Ottoman chronicles.

== Bibliography ==
In 2015, he published a Dictionnaire de l'empire Ottoman XVe-XVIes with François Georgeon and Gilles Veinstein.

=== Works ===
- L'ordre de Saint-Jean-de-Jérusalem, l'Empire ottoman et la Méditerranée orientale entre les deux sièges de Rhodes (1480-1522), Louvain-Paris, Peeters, 1994, 571 p. (traduction turque parue aux éditions Tarih Vakfi, Istanbul, 2004)
- Sultan Djem. Un prince ottoman dans l'Europe du XVe d'après deux sources contemporaines : Vâkı'ât-ı Sultân Cem, œuvres de Guillaume Caoursin, Ankara, Société Turque d'Histoire, 1997, 379 p.
- Rhodes et l'ordre de Saint-Jean-de-Jérusalem, Paris, CNRS Éditions, 2000, 119 p.
- avec Stéphane Yerasimos : Les cimetières dans la ville. Statuts, choix et organisation des lieux d'inhumation dans Istanbul intra-muros, Paris-Istanbul, Institut Français d'´Études Anatoliennes - Librairie d'Amérique et d'Orient (Maisonneuve), 2001, 270 p.
- Les Ottomans et l'occident XVe-XVIes), Istanbul, Isis, 2001, 196 p. (recueil d'articles)
- with Gilles Veinstein : Le Sérail ébranlé. Essai sur les morts, dépositions et avènements des sultans ottomans. XIVe-XIXes, Paris, Fayard, 2003, 523 p.
- with Gilles Veinstein : Insularités ottomanes, Paris, Institut français d'études anatoliennes et Maisonneuve & Larose, 2004, 310 p. (publication des actes d'un colloque)
- with Edhem Eldem : L’épitaphe ottomane musulmane. Contribution à une histoire de la culture ottomane, Paris-Louvain, Peeters, 2007, X + 377 p.
- Ferîdûn Bey. Les plaisants secrets de la campagne de Szigetvar. Édition, traduction et commentaire desfolios 1 à 147 du Nüzhetü-l-esrâr-il-ahbâr der sefer-i Sigetvâr(ms. H 1339 de la Bibliothèque du Musée de Topkapi Sarayi, Vienne-Munster, LIT Verlag, 2010, 542 p.
- with Gilles Veinsein et Elizabeth Zachariadou, Catalogue du fonds ottoman des archives du Monastère de Saint-Jean à Patmos. Les vingt-deux premiers dossiers, Athènes, Fondation Nationale de la Recherche Scientifique, Institut d’Études Byzantines, 2011, 973 p.
- under the direction of Nicolas Vatin and Vincent Déroche, Constantinople 1453. Des Byzantins aux Ottomans, Anacharsis, 2016, 1405 pages
