= Gyula, Hungary =

Gyula
- Town
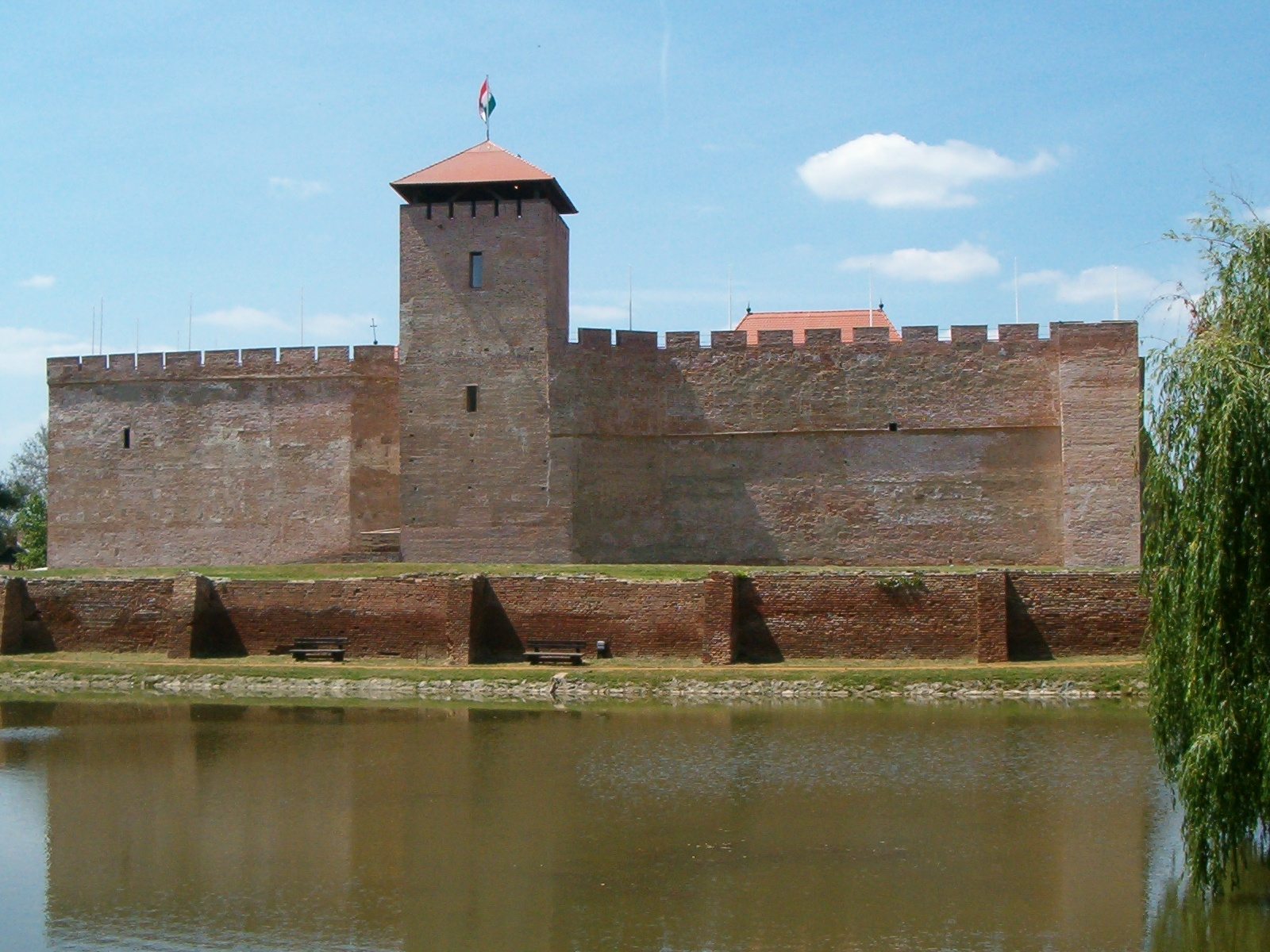
- Gyula Castle

- Flag Coat of arms

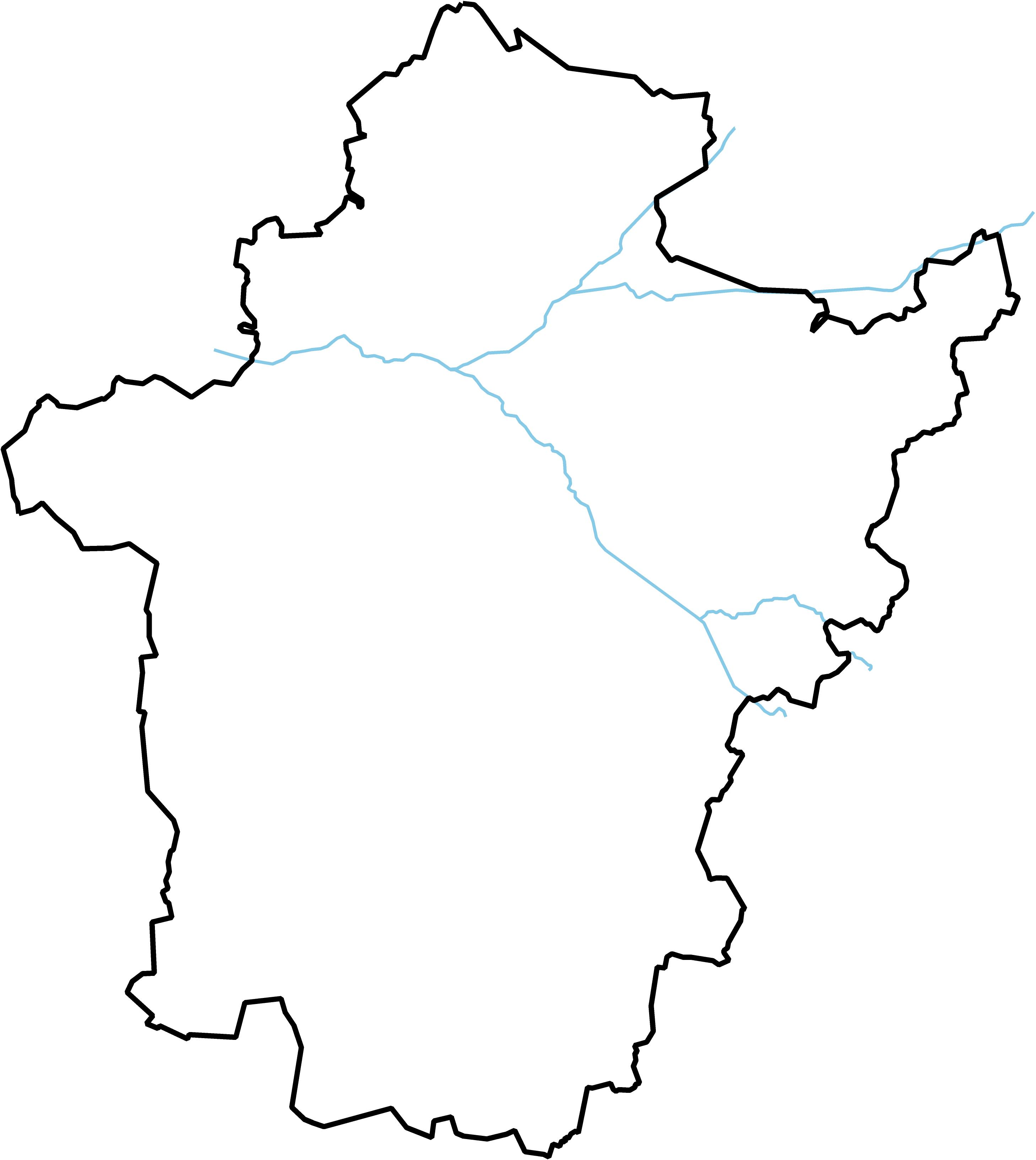
- Location within Békés County Location within Hungary
- Coordinates: 46°39′N 21°17′E
- Country: Hungary
- County: Békés
- District: Gyula

Area
  - Total: 255.8 km^{2} (98.8 sq mi)

Population (2017)
  - Total: 30,004
  - Density: 117.3/km^{2} (303.8/sq mi)
- Demonym: gyulai

Population by ethnicity
  - Hungarians: 83.4%
  - Romanians: 3.1%
  - Germans: 3.1%
  - Romani: 0.3%
  - Slovaks: 0.3%
  - Others: 0.8%

Population by religion
  - Roman Catholic: 18.4%
  - Greek Catholic: 0.4%
  - Calvinists: 17.9%
  - Lutherans: 1.6%
  - Other: 4.5%
  - Non-religious: 28.2%
  - Unknown: 29.0%
- Time zone: UTC+1 (CET)
  - Summer (DST): UTC+2 (CEST)
- Postal code: 5700, 5711
- Area code: (+36) 66
- Website: gyula.hu

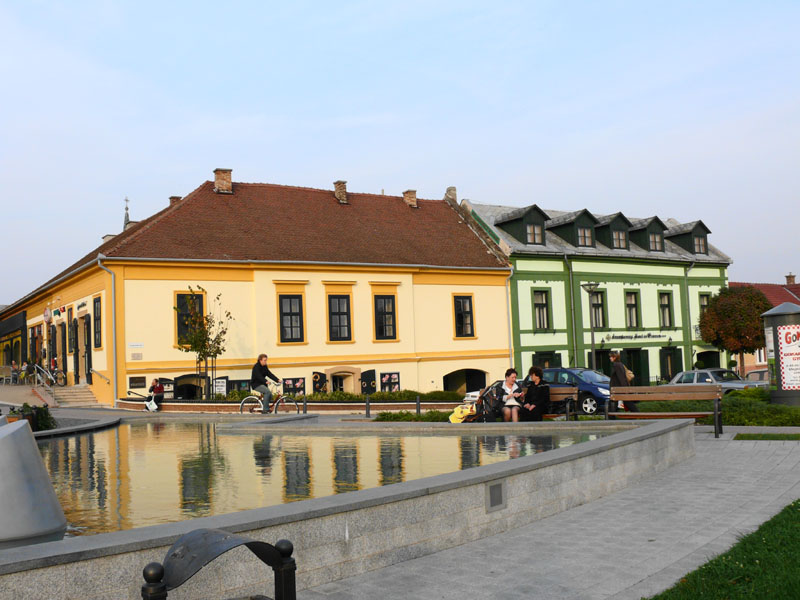
Downtown of Gyula

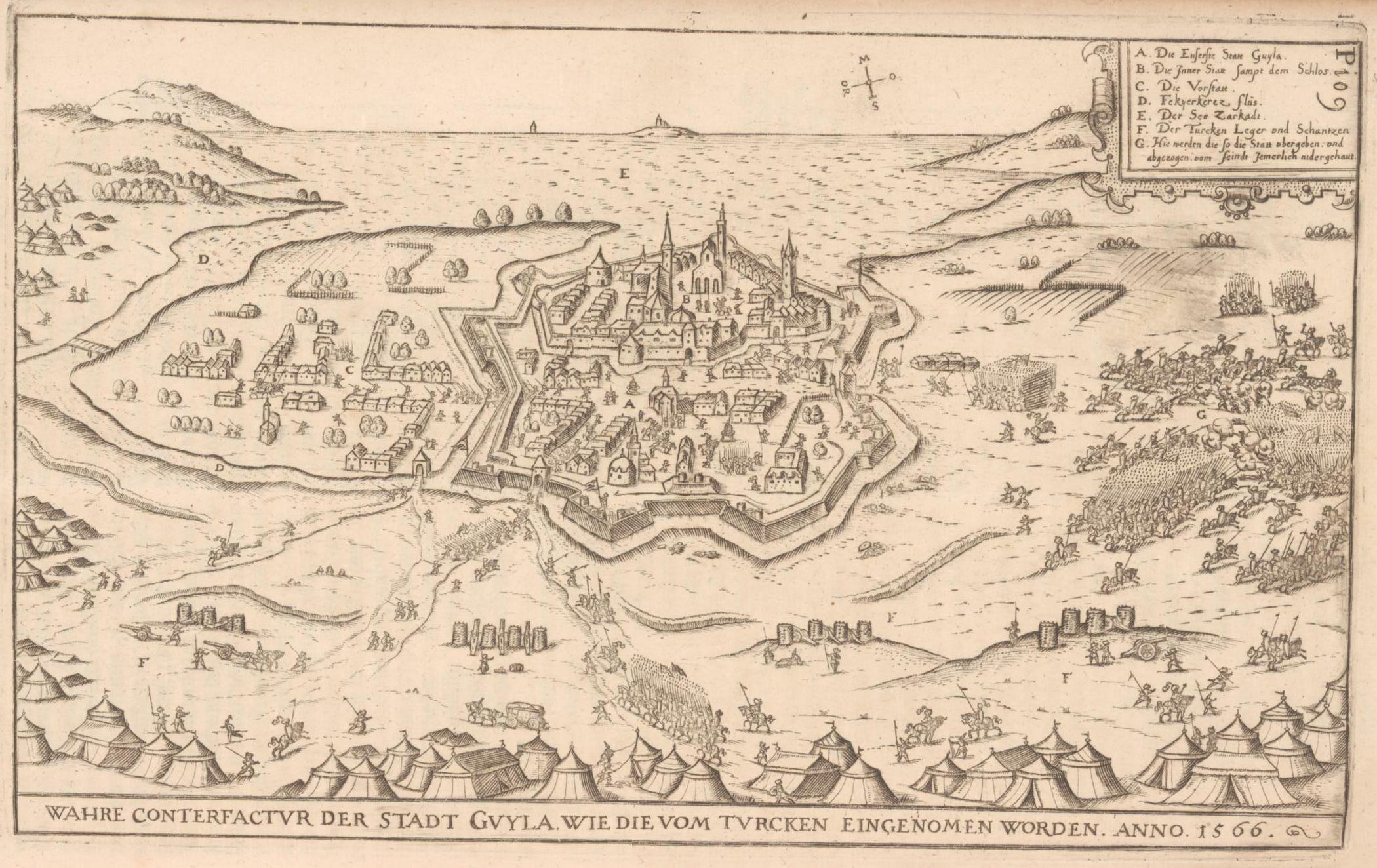
Siege of Gyula 1566

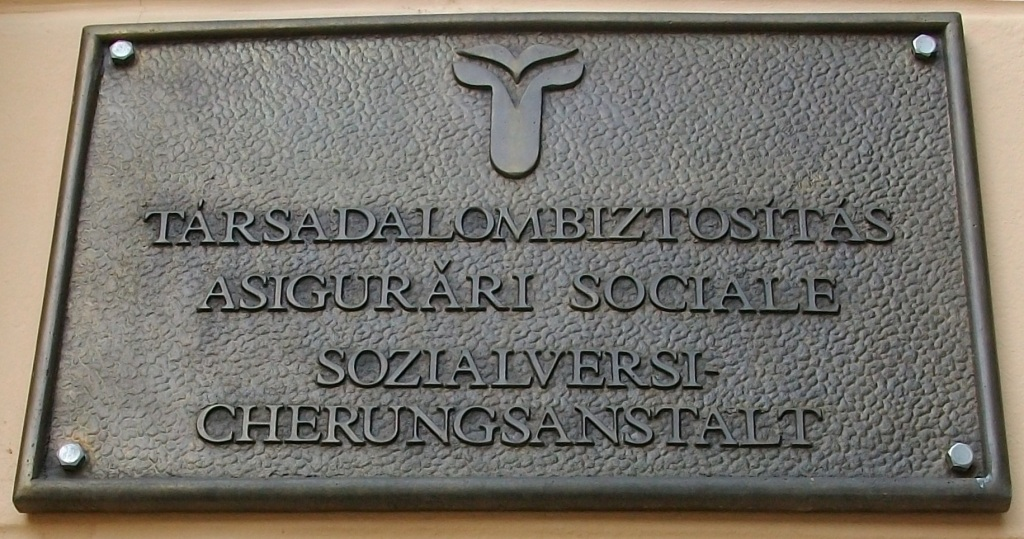
Trilingual (Hungarian, Romanian, German) table in Gyula (meaning "social health insurance")

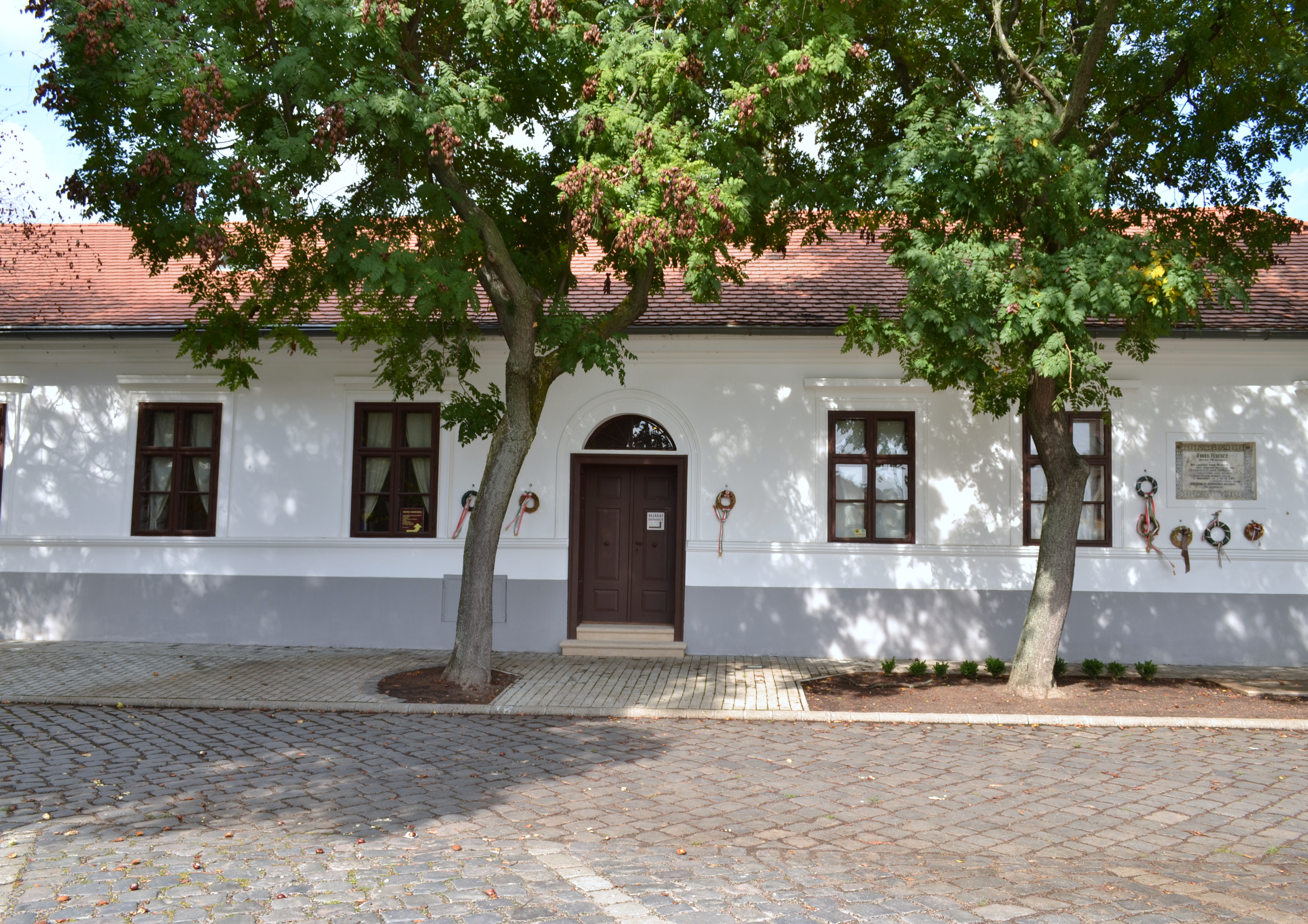
Birth house of Ferenc Erkel, the composer of the Hungarian national anthem

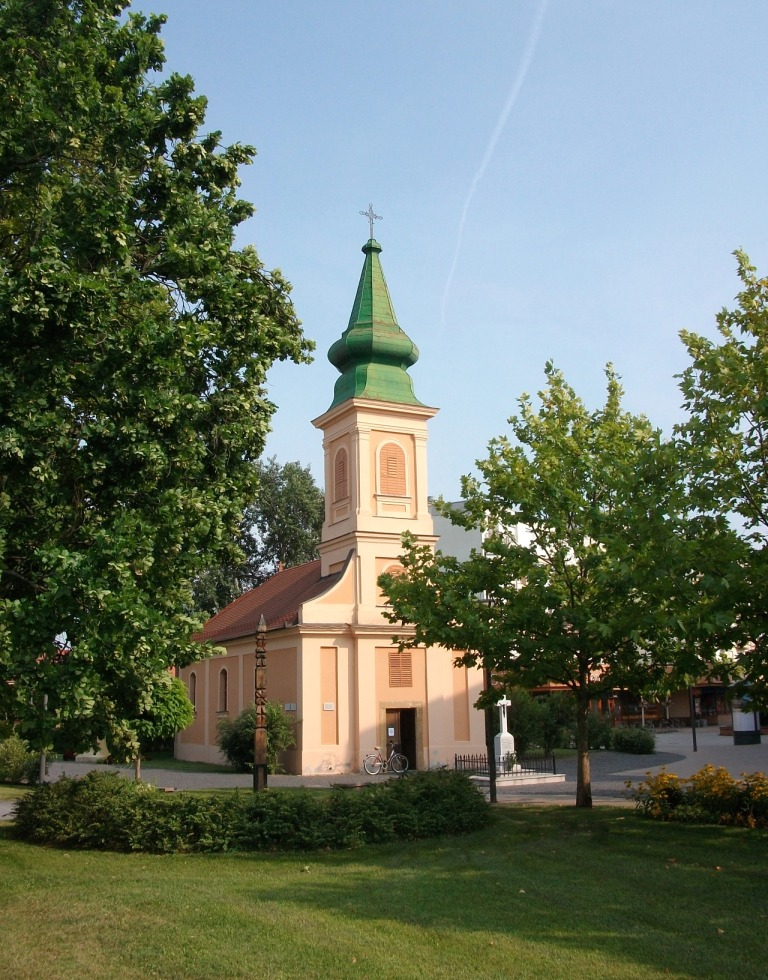
Roman Catholic chapel in Gyula

Gyula (Hungarian pronunciation: [ˈɟulɒ]; Romanian: Jula or Giula; German: Jula) is a town in Békés County, Hungary.

The town is best known for its medieval castle and a thermal bath. Ferenc Erkel, the composer of the Hungarian national anthem, and Albrecht Dürer the Elder, the father of Albrecht Dürer, were also born in Gyula, as was the 2025 Nobel Prize in Literature laureate László Krasznahorkai.

== Name ==
Gyula is named after the medieval Hungarian warlord Gyula III. Gyula was also a title among the Hungarian tribes and still a common male given name.

In Romanian, the town is known as Jula or Giula, in German as Jula and in Turkish as Göle.

== Geography ==
Gyula is located in the Great Hungarian Plain on the River Fehér-Körös, 235 km (146 mi) southeast from Budapest and 5 km (3 mi) from the border with Romania. The (Szeged-)Békéscsaba-Gyula-Kötegyán railway line and Highway 44 also cross the town. Highway 44 is a four-lane expressway between Gyula and the county seat Békéscsaba.

=== Neighbourhoods ===
The town has several quarters including Óváros (Old Town), Újváros (New Town), Nagyrománváros (Great Romanian Quarter), Kisrománváros (Little Romanian Quarter) Magyarváros (Hungarian Quarter), Németváros (German Quarter), Kisváros (Small Town), Kastélykert (Castle Garden), Krinolinkert (Crinoline Garden), Szentpálfalva (Saint Paul's Village), Ajtósfalva (Doormaker's Village).

== History ==
The first recorded reference to Gyula was in a document dated 1313 which mentions a monastery called Gyulamonostora (Julamonustra in Latin). By 1332 the settlement around the monastery was called Gyula. The construction of Gyula Castle began in the 14th century but finished only in the mid-16th century. It was the property of the Maróthy family and later John Corvinus, the illegitimate son of Matthias Corvinus.

In the beginning of July 1566, an Ottoman army of 27,000–30,000 men led by Pertev Mehmed Pasha surrounded the 2,000-strong Gyula castle and laid siege to it. The city defenders surrendered after 59–63 days of siege. No other castle in 16th-century Hungary could hold the besieging Ottoman army for such a long time. Despite securing a deal, the defenders who withdrew on 2 September were looted and many of them were slaughtered by the Janissaries. Castle captain László Kerecsényi was also captured and taken to Belgrade, where he was executed in 1567.

From 1566, the town became part of Ottoman Hungary. During Ottoman rule, it was known as Göle and was an important sanjak in the centre of the Temeşvar Eyalet.

At the end of 1693, Gyula remained the only stronghold of the Ottomans north of the Maros river. In 1694, several Turkish letters sent from the castle were intercepted by the imperial troops, in which they requested the delivery of food from the Turkish army stationed in Temesvár. The Turkish military leadership was unable to deliver food to Gyula. In mid-December 1694, the Turkish castle commander indicated his intention to capitulate. On 21 December, a contract was signed on the surrender of the castle and the free retreat of the guard and the population. Gyula's Turkish guard left the castle on 18 January 1695, and after 129 years, the city was liberated by Christian troops.

Due to the wars, most of the native Hungarian population fled from Gyula and Békés County became near uninhabited. The landowner János Harruckern invited German, Hungarian, and Romanian settlers, who re-established the town in the early 18th century. In 1881, the town had 18,046 inhabitants, of which 12,103 were Hungarians, 2,608 Romanians, 2,124 Germans, 400 Slovaks and 811 of other ethnicities. Gyula became a popular tourist destination in the 20th century. The thermal bath was established in 1942 and expanded in 1959, and the castle was restored in 1962.

== Demographics ==
According to the 2011 census, the population of Gyula was 31,067, of whom there were 25,895 (83.4%) Hungarians, 974 (3.1%) Romanians, 971 (3.1%) Germans and 102 (0.3%) Romani by ethnicity. In Hungary, people can declare more than one ethnicity, so some people declared Hungarian and a minority one together.

Gyula is the center of the small native Romanian community of Hungary. It has its own newspaper published in Gyula, Foaia Românească ("The Romanian Sheet"). Gyula also has a school for its Romanian population, the Nicolae Bălcescu Romanian Gymnasium, Primary School and College, as well as a Research Institute of the Romanians of Hungary seated in the town. Furthermore, the Diocese of Gyula, the Romanian Orthodox diocese serving the Romanians in Hungary, is seated in Gyula. The town itself hosts two Romanian Orthodox churches, the St. Nicholas Romanian Orthodox Cathedral and the St. Paraskeva Church. There is also a consulate general of Romania in Gyula.

In 2011 there were 5,726 (18.4%) Roman Catholic, 5,560 (17.9%) Hungarian Reformed (Calvinist), 606 (2.0%) Orthodox and 507 (1.6%) Lutheran in Gyula. 8,304 people (26.7%) were irreligious and 453 (1.5%) Atheist, while 9,012 people (29.0%) did not declare their religion.

== Tourist attractions ==
- Gyula Castle (Gyulai vár)
- Thermal bath (Gyulai gyógyfürdő)
- 100-year-old confectionery (100 éves cukrászda)
- Town hall, 1861 (Városháza)
- Birth house of Ferenc Erkel (Erkel Ferenc szülőháza)
- Saint Michael Cathedral, 1825 (Szent Miklós katedrális)
- Roman Catholic church, 1775-1777 (Római katolikus templom)
- Roman Catholic chapel, 1738–1752, (Római katolikus kápolna)

== Politics ==
The current mayor of Gyula is Dr. Ernő István Görgényi of the Fidesz-KDNP party.

The local Municipal Assembly has 14+1 members divided into this political parties and alliances:

Party	Seats	2014 Council
Fidesz-KDNP	10	
Gyulai Városbarátok Köre	2	
Movement for a Better Hungary (Jobbik)	1	
Unity (Együtt-PM-MSZP-DK)	1	

== Sport ==
The Christián László Municipal Sports Complex is a municipal sports complex, consisting of 13 hectares of sports facilities, which includes the Himer Center field with an athletics track and a football pitch surrounded by a motorcycle speedway track. In addition, there are two more full size football pitches, tennis courts, basketball and skateboarding facilities.

== Notable people ==
=== Born in Gyula ===
- Béla Bánáthy (1919–2003), social scientist and professor
- Zoltán Bay (1900–1992), physicist (born in Gyulavári, now part of Gyula)
- Imre Bródy (1891–1944), physicist
- Albrecht Dürer the Elder (1427–1502), the father of Albrecht Dürer
- Ferenc Erkel (1810–1893), composer
- Imre König (1901–1992), chess player
- László Krasznahorkai (born 1954), novelist and screenwriter, Nobel laureate
- Mihály Mező (born 1978), singer and musician
- Moise Nicoară (1784–1861), Romanian lawyer, professor, translator and writer
- George Pomutz (1818–1882), Romanian-American diplomat and general

=== Lived in Gyula ===
- Róbert Barna (1974–2013), Hungarian bodybuilding champion
- Béla Bartók (1881–1945), Hungarian composer

=== Burials in Gyula ===
- Beatrice de Frangepan (1480–1510), wife of John Corvin

== Twin Towns - Sister Cities ==
Gyula is twinned with:

- Arad, Romania (1994)
- Bălți, Moldova
- Budrio, Italy (1965)
- Ditzingen, Germany (1991)
- Droitwich, United Kingdom (2001)
- Krumpendorf, Austria (1995)
- Miercurea-Ciuc, Romania (1993)
- Schenkenfelden, Austria (1997)
- Zalău, Romania (1991)
