= Ottoman Serbs =

Ethnic group in the Ottoman Empire

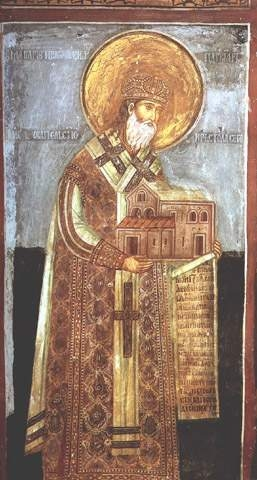
Serbian Patriarch Makarije Sokolović (1557-1572)

Ottoman Serbs (Turkish: Osmanlı Sırpları) were ethnic Serbs who lived in the Ottoman Empire (1453–1922). Ottoman Serbs, who were Serbian Orthodox Christian, belonged to the Rum Millet (millet-i Rûm, "Roman Nation"). Although a separate Serbian millet (Sırp Milleti) was not officially recognized during Ottoman rule, the Serbian Church was the legally confirmed representative organization of the Serbs in the Ottoman Empire.

== History ==
=== Early modern period ===
The Serbs had taken an active part in the wars fought in the Balkans against the Ottoman Empire, and also organized uprisings. Because of this, they suffered persecution and their territories were devastated. Major migrations from Serbia into Habsburg territory ensued.

In early 1594, the Serbs in Banat rose up against the Ottomans. The rebels had, in the character of a holy war, carried war flags with the icon of Saint Sava. After suppressing the uprising, the Ottomans publicly incinerated the relics of Saint Sava at the Vračar plateau on April 27, 1595. The incineration of Sava's relics provoked the Serbs, and empowered the Serb liberation movement. From 1596, the center of anti-Ottoman activity in Herzegovina was the Tvrdoš Monastery in Trebinje. An uprising broke out in 1596, but the rebels were defeated at the field of Gacko in 1597, and were forced to capitulate due to the lack of foreign support.

After allied Christian forces had captured Buda from the Ottoman Empire in 1686 during the Great Turkish War, Serbs from Pannonian Plain (present-day Hungary, Slavonia region in present-day Croatia, Bačka and Banat regions in present-day Serbia) joined the troops of the Habsburg Monarchy as separate units known as Serbian Militia. Serbs, as volunteers, massively joined the Austrian side. In 1688, the Habsburg army took Belgrade and entered the territory of present-day Central Serbia. Louis William, Margrave of Baden-Baden called Serbian Patriarch Arsenije III Čarnojević to raise arms against the Turks; the Patriarch accepted and returned to the liberated Peć. As Serbia fell under Habsburg control, Leopold I granted Arsenije nobility and the title of duke. After the ensuing Ottoman victory, a large migration of Serbs to Habsburg lands was undertaken by Patriarch Arsenije III. The large community of Serbs concentrated in Banat, southern Hungary and the Military Frontier included merchants and craftsmen in the cities, but mainly refugees that were peasants. Serbia remained under Ottoman control until the early 19th century, with the eruption of the Serbian Revolution in 1804.

=== 1900s ===
The Serb Democratic League was an Ottoman Serb political organisation established on August 13, 1908, at the First Serb Conference (August 10–13), immediately after the Young Turk Revolution. It included the Serb elite of Old Raška, Kosovo and Metohija, and Vardar Macedonia and Aegean Macedonia.

== Serbian Patriarchate of Peć ==
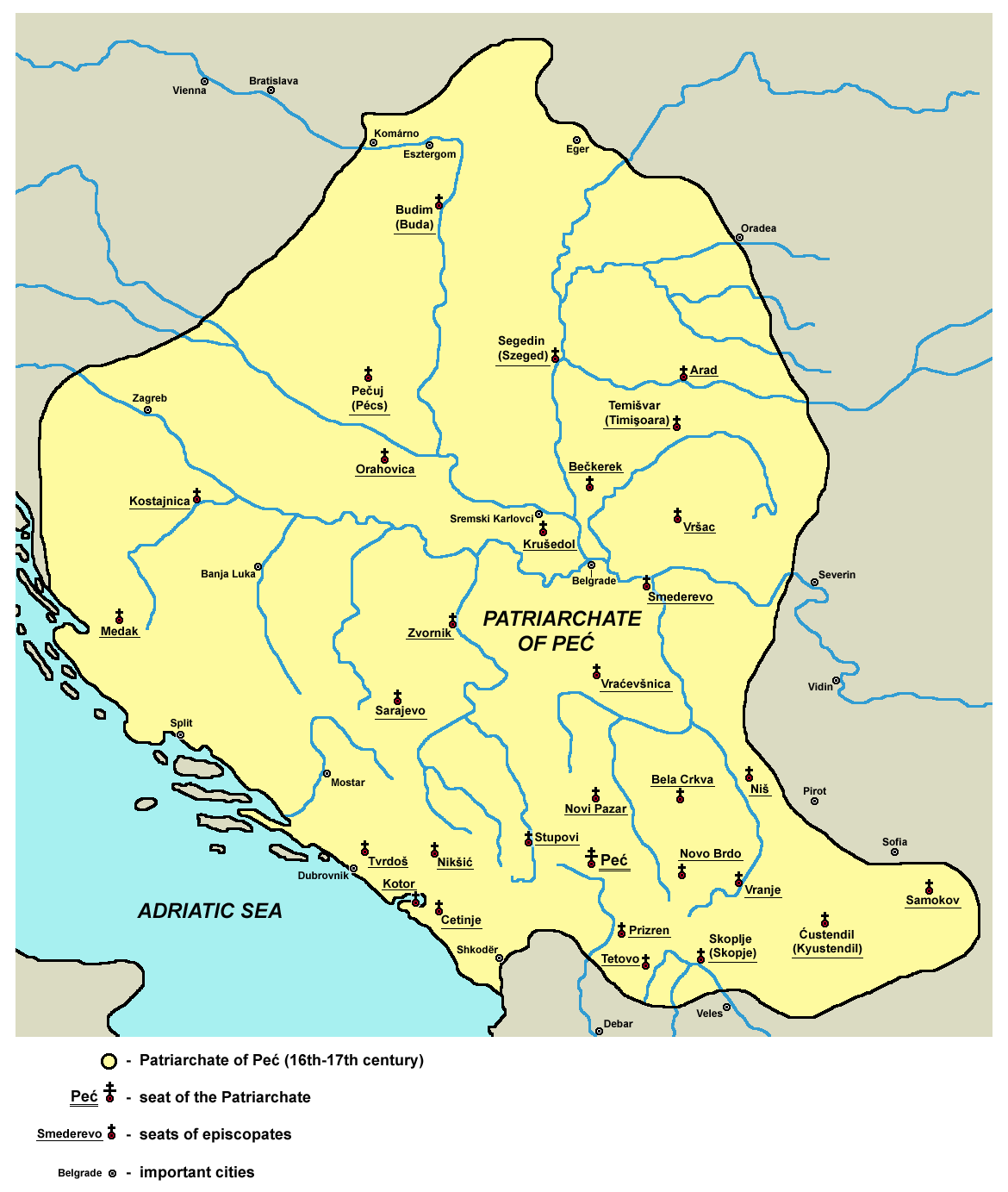
Serbian Patriarchate of Peć, during the 16th and 17th century

The Serbian Orthodox Church was re-established in 1557, as the Serbian Patriarchate of Peć. The Patriarchate was abolished in 1766.

== Nationality status ==
In 1826, an addendum to the Akkerman Convention mentioned the Serb Millet. Since given autonomy in 1830, the Principality of Serbia urged the Ottoman government to recognize the Serb nation outside the principality, in Ottoman territories.

In 1906, the Ottoman government recognized the Serb Millet in Macedonia. This decision was made independently from the Serbian government.

== Notable people ==
After the Ottoman conquest of the Balkans, the Ottoman Empire acquired a significant Serb community. Among notable people in the Ottoman government of fully or partial Serb ancestry were several viziers and sultans (Suleiman II and Osman III).

Serb community

- Marko Mrnjavčević, Serbian provincial lord, Ottoman vassal
- Mihailo Anđelović, Serbian Despotate
- Stanislav Sočivica (1715–1777), Serbian rebel leader, active in Bosnia and Herzegovina and Montenegro
- Makarije Sokolović (1557-1571), Bosnian Serb Orthodox Bishop from Višegrad, restored as Serbian Patriarch after sede vacante in 1463. Member of Sokolović family
- Antonije I Sokolović (1571-1574), Serbian Patriarch. Member of Sokolović family
- Gerasim I Sokolović (1574-1586), Serbian Patriarch. Member of Sokolović family
- Savatije Sokolović (1574-1586), Serbian Patriarch from Rum millet. Member of Sokolović family
- Jerotej Sokolović (1589-1591), Serbian Patriarch. Member of Sokolović family
- Filip Sokolović (1591-1592), Serbian Patriarch. Member of Sokolović family
- Jovan Kantul (1592-1614), Serbian Patriarch
- Pajsije Janjevac (1542-1647), Serbian Patriarch from Janjevo, Ottoman Empire,
- Gavrilo I Rajić (1648-1655), Serbian Patriarch
- Maksim I Skopljanac (1655-1674), Serbian Patriarch
- Arsenije III Crnojević (1633-1706), Serbian Patriarch from Cetinje
- Kalinik I (1691-1710), Serbian Patriarch from Skopje
- Atanasije I (1711-1712), Serbian Patriarch
- Mojsije I Rajović (1712-1726), Serbian Patriarch
- Arsenije IV Jovanović Šakabenta (1698-1748), Serbian Patriarch from Peć
- Atanasije II Gavrilović (17th century), Serbian Patriarch
- Gavrilo II (1741-1752), Serbian Patriarch, born in Sarajevo, Ottoman Empire
- Gavrilo III (1752-1758), Serbian Patriarch
- Vikentije I Stefanović (18th century), Serbian Patriarch
- Vasilije Jovanović-Brkić (18th century), Metropolitan of Dabar and Bosnia, Serbian Patriarch
- For Serbian Revolutionaries, see this list.

Ottoman government

- Mehmed-paša Sokolović, Ottoman Grand Vizier from 1565 to 1579, member of Serbian Orthodox Sokolović family
- Ferhad Pasha Sokolović, Ottoman general and statesman, close relative Grand Vizier Sokollu Mehmed Pasha, member of Serbian Orthodox Sokolović family
- Sokollu Mustafa Pasha, Ottoman general and statesman, uncle (or cousin) of Grand Vizier Sokollu Mehmed Pasha, member of Serbian Orthodox Sokolović family
- Olivera Despina, daughter of Prince Lazar, consort of Sultan Bayezid I.
- Veli Mahmud Pasha, Grand Vizier 1456–68 and 1472–74. Serbian-Byzantine from Novo Brdo.
- Deli Husrev Pasha, Ottoman statesman and second vizier, early members of Serbian Orthodox Sokolović family
- Lala Mustafa Pasha, Ottoman Grand Vizier in 1580, early members of Serbian Orthodox Sokolović family
- Sokolluzade Lala Mehmed Pasha, Ottoman Grand Vizier from 1604 to 1606, he may have been a cousin of Sokollu Mehmed Pasha, member of Serbian Orthodox Sokolovic
- Boşnak Derviş Mehmed Pasha, Ottoman Grand Vizier during 1606, from Serbian Orthodox converted to Islam.
- Nevesinli Salih Pasha, Ottoman Grand Vizier from 1645 to 1647
- Daltaban Mustafa Pasha, Ottoman Grand Vizier from 1702 to 1703
- Yavuz Ali Pasha, Ottoman Governor of Egypt from 1601 to 1603
- George Berovich, Governor-General of Crete and Prince of Samos.
- Gedik Ahmed Pasha, Grand Vizier 1474–77. Serbian from Vranje.
- Omar Pasha (Serbian: Mihajlo Latas; 1806–1871), general, convert
- Mara Branković, wife of Murad II, very influential in imperial affairs, ambassador to Venice
- Osman Aga of Temesvar (1670–1725), Ottoman commander
- Skenderbeg Crnojević
- George Berovich
- Aganlija
- Kučuk-Alija
- Sali Aga
- Sinan-paša Sijerčić, Ottoman Bosnian general. Bosnian Serb origin.
- Malkoçoğlu family, one of four leading akinci families. Serbian origin.

== See also ==
- Ottoman Greeks
- Habsburg Serbs

== Sources ==
- Aslantaş, S. (2010). SIRP MİLLETİNİN İNŞASINDA BİR ARAÇ OLARAK TARİH. In Perspectives on Ottoman studies: papers from the 18th Symposium of the International Committee of Pre-Ottoman and Ottoman Studies (CIEPO) at the University of Zagreb 2008 (Vol. 1, p. 97). LIT Verlag Münster. (in Turkish)
- Babinger, Franz (1992). Mehmed the Conqueror and His Time. Princeton University Press. ISBN 0691010781.
- Bataković, Dušan T., ed. (2005). Histoire du peuple serbe [History of the Serbian People] (in French). Lausanne: L’Age d’Homme. ISBN 9782825119587.
- Ćirković, Sima (2004). The Serbs. Malden: Blackwell Publishing. ISBN 9781405142915.
- Finkel, Caroline (2006). Osman's Dream: The Story of the Ottoman Empire 1300–1923. London: John Murray. ISBN 978-0-7195-6112-2.
- Finkel, Caroline (2012). Osman's dream: the story of the Ottoman Empire, 1300-1923. Basic Books. ISBN 9780465008506.
- İnal, Günseli; Arşivi, Semiramis (2005). Semiramis: Sultan'ın gözünden şenlik. YKY. ISBN 978-975-08-0928-6.
- Isailović, Neven G.; Krstić, Aleksandar R. (2015). "Serbian Language and Cyrillic Script as a Means of Diplomatic Literacy in South Eastern Europe in 15th and 16th Centuries". Literacy Experiences concerning Medieval and Early Modern Transylvania. Cluj-Napoca: George Bariţiu Institute of History. pp. 185–195.
- Jagodić, Miloš (2008). "Нуфуско питање: проблем званичног признавања српске нације у Турској 1894-1910" [The Nüfus Question: Problem of official recognition of Serb nationality in Turkey 1894-1910]. Историјски часопис. 57: 343–354.
- Jelavich, Barbara (1983). History of the Balkans: Eighteenth and Nineteenth Centuries. Vol. 1. Cambridge University Press. ISBN 9780521252492.
- Krstić, Aleksandar R. (2017). "Which Realm will You Opt for? – The Serbian Nobility Between the Ottomans and the Hungarians in the 15th Century". State and Society in the Balkans Before and After Establishment of Ottoman Rule. Belgrade: Institute of History, Yunus Emre Enstitüsü Turkish Cultural Centre. pp. 129–163. ISBN 9788677431259.
- Meram, Ali Kemal (1977). Padişah anaları: resimli belgesel tarih romanı (in Turkish). Öz Yayınları.
- Parlić-Božović, Jasna Lj. (2011). "Serbs in education during the Turkish government". Zbornik radova Filozofskog fakulteta u Prištini. 41: 555–568.
- Sotirović, Vladislav B. (2011). "The Serbian Patriarchate of Peć in the Ottoman Empire: The First Phase (1557–94)". Serbian Studies: Journal of the North American Society for Serbian Studies. 25 (2): 143–169. doi:10.1353/ser.2011.0038. S2CID 143629322.
- Stavrides, Théoharis (2001). The Sultan of Vezirs: The Life and Times of the Ottoman Grand Vezir Mahmud Pasha Angelovic (1453–1474). Brill. ISBN 978-90-04-12106-5.
- Stojančević, Vladimir. Južnoslovenski narodi u Osmanskom carstvu od Jedrenskog mira 1829. do Pariskog kongresa 1856. godine. Izdavačko-štamparsko preduzeće PTT, 1971.
