= 1603 =

1603 in various calendars
- Gregorian calendar: 1603; MDCIII
- Ab urbe condita: 2356
- Armenian calendar: 1052; ԹՎ ՌԾԲ
- Assyrian calendar: 6353
- Balinese saka calendar: 1524–1525
- Bengali calendar: 1009–1010
- Berber calendar: 2553
- English Regnal year: 45 Eliz. 1 – 1 Ja. 1
- Buddhist calendar: 2147
- Burmese calendar: 965
- Byzantine calendar: 7111–7112
- Chinese calendar: 壬寅年 (Water Tiger); 4300 or 4093 — to — 癸卯年 (Water Rabbit); 4301 or 4094
- Coptic calendar: 1319–1320
- Discordian calendar: 2769
- Ethiopian calendar: 1595–1596
- Hebrew calendar: 5363–5364
- Hindu calendars
- Vikram Samvat: 1659–1660
- Shaka Samvat: 1524–1525
- Kali Yuga: 4703–4704
- Holocene calendar: 11603
- Igbo calendar: 603–604
- Iranian calendar: 981–982
- Islamic calendar: 1011–1012
- Japanese calendar: Keichō 8 (慶長８年)
- Javanese calendar: 1523–1524
- Julian calendar: Gregorian minus 10 days
- Korean calendar: 3936
- Minguo calendar: 309 before ROC 民前309年
- Nanakshahi calendar: 135
- Thai solar calendar: 2145–2146
- Tibetan calendar: ཆུ་ཕོ་སྟག་ལོ་ (male Water-Tiger); 1729 or 1348 or 576 — to — ཆུ་མོ་ཡོས་ལོ་ (female Water-Hare); 1730 or 1349 or 577

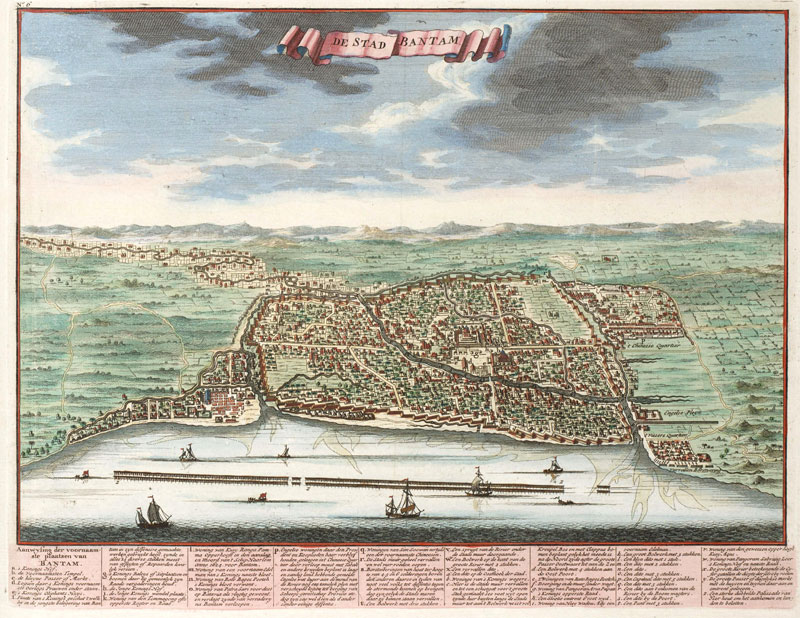
February 25: The first permanent Dutch trading post in Indonesia is established in Banten.

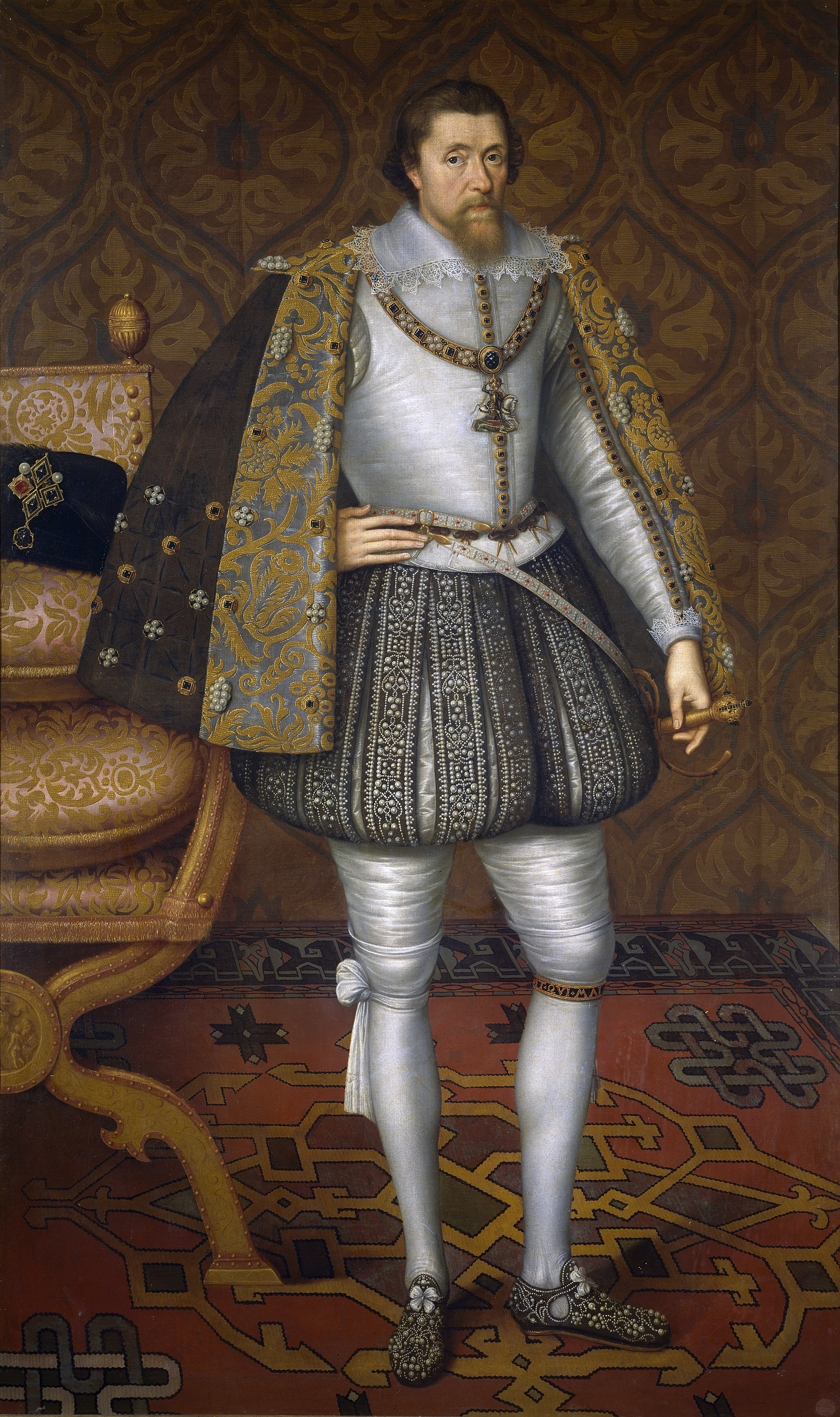
March 24: James I becomes King of England.

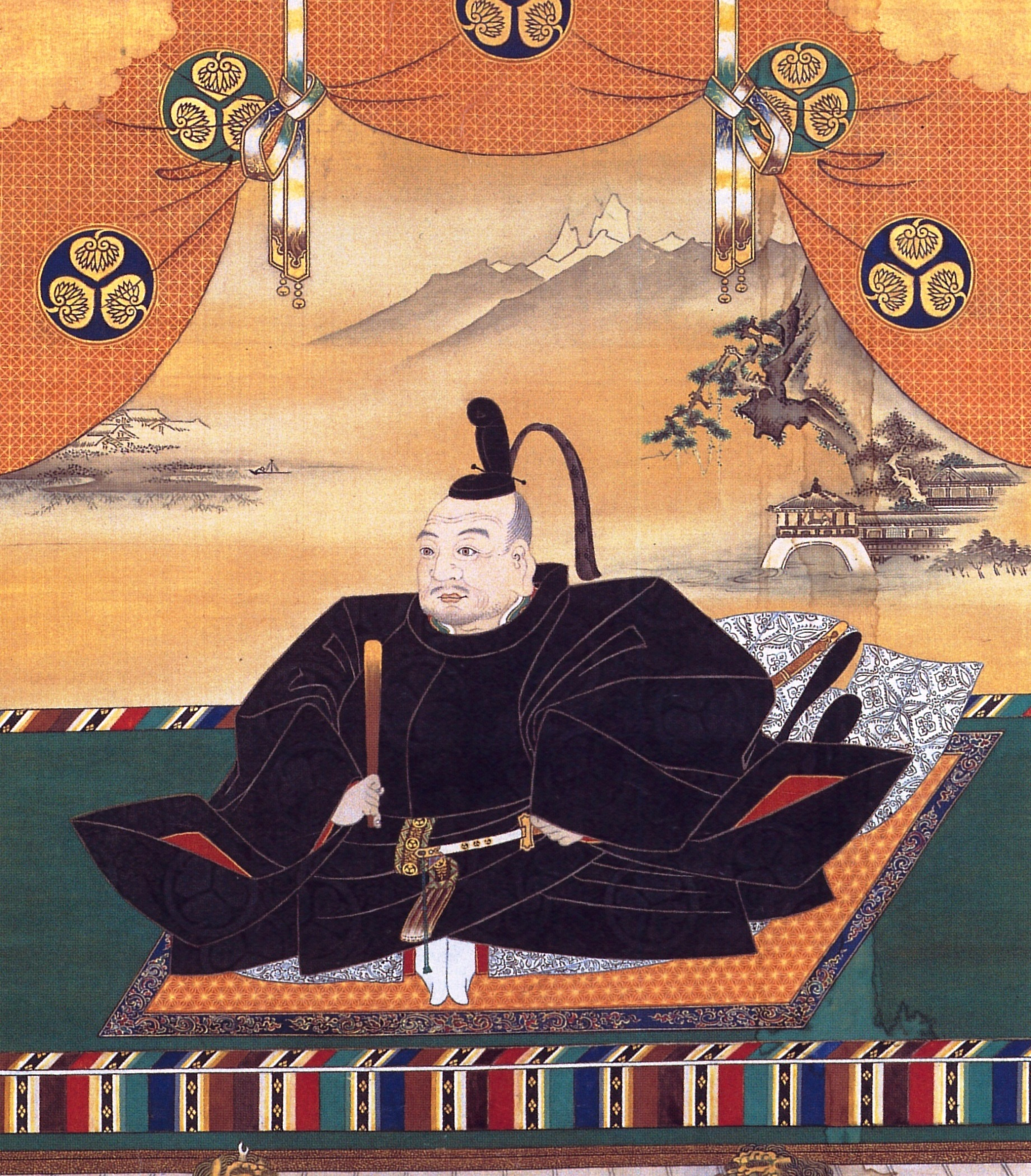
March 24: Tokugawa Ieyasu becomes Shogun of Japan.

1603 (MDCIII) was a common year starting on Wednesday of the Gregorian calendar and a common year starting on Saturday of the Julian calendar, the 1603rd year of the Common Era (CE) and Anno Domini (AD) designations, the 603rd year of the 2nd millennium, the 3rd year of the 17th century, and the 4th year of the 1600s decade. As of the start of 1603, the Gregorian calendar was 10 days ahead of the Julian calendar, which remained in localized use until 1923.

== Events ==
=== January–March ===
- January 24 – Anglo-Spanish War: English Admiral Christopher Newport leads an unsuccessful attempt to take the Spanish-controlled Caribbean island of Jamaica, where he was attempting to pillage the area to obtain supplies. The Spanish defenders repel the fleet, and Newport leads the attackers to the coast of Central America.
- February 17 – Anglo-Spanish War: The Battle of Puerto Caballos is fought off of the coast of Guatemala by two Spanish Navy galleons, and eight English Navy and French pirate ships. The English-French soldiers and pirates, commanded by Christopher Newport and Michael Geare, plunder Puerto Caballos over the next two weeks, and the Spanish defenders suffer 230 casualties.
- February 25 – Dutch–Portuguese War: the Portuguese ship Santa Catarina is seized by Dutch East India Company ships off Singapore.
- March 15 – French explorer Samuel de Champlain departs from the Channel port of Honfleur in the Calvados département in the Kingdom of France for his first voyage to the settlement of New France in what is now Canada.
- March 24
  - Queen Elizabeth I of England dies at Richmond Palace (having ruled since 1558). She is succeeded by her first cousin twice removed, King James VI of Scotland (where he has ruled since 1567), uniting the crowns of Scotland and England.
  - Tokugawa Ieyasu is granted the title of shōgun from Emperor Go-Yozei, and establishes the Tokugawa shogunate in Edo, Japan. The 265-year-long Edo period begins.
- March 30 – The Nine Years War (Ireland) is ended by the submission of Hugh O'Neill, Earl of Tyrone, to the English Crown, and the signing of the Treaty of Mellifont.

=== April–June ===
- April 27 – The first permanent Dutch trading post in Indonesia is established in Banten by Vice Admiral Wybrand van Warwijck, who sets up a factory to store and package the trading commodity black pepper.
- April 28 – The funeral of Elizabeth I of England is held in Westminster Abbey.
- May 8 – Mozes Székely is installed as the Prince of Transylvania by the Ottoman Sultan, Mehmed III. Székely is killed in battle on July 17.
- May 13 – In modern-day northern Thailand, the rulers of Chiang Mai retake control of the Nan province and capture its ruler, Cao Cetabut.
- May 14 – Pope Gabriel VIII of Alexandria, leader of the Coptic Christian Church, dies after a reign of almost 16 years. He is succeeded by Pope Mark V.
- May 19 – The King's Men, a troupe of English professional actors composed primarily of former members of the Lord Chamberlain's Men, is granted its royal patent by King James. The company will give the first performances of many of the plays of William Shakespeare, who is one of the company's 26 principal actors. Named in order of priority on the patent are manager Lawrence Fletcher, Shakespeare, and Richard Burbage.
- May 26 – The Battle of Sluis is fought at sea off of the Belgian Netherlands as Spanish ships try unsuccessfully to break through a blockade port of the port of Sluis. The Spanish ships are forced to return to port after at least 414 sailors are killed.
- May 29 – A tabagie feast is held in Tadoussac in the modern-day Canadian province of Quebec, as representatives of France (Samuel de Champlain and François Gravé Du Pont, form an alliance with representatives of the Innu, Algonquin and Maliseet tribes.
- June 7 – Prince Şehzade Mahmud of the Ottoman Empire, the 16-year-old son of Sultan Murad III, is executed on orders of his father, on advice of the Grand Vizier, after being accused unjustly of an assassination plot.

=== July–September ===
- July 17 – Sir Walter Raleigh is arrested in England on charges of treason and of conspiring with Lord Cobham in the "Main Plot" to overthrow King James for replacement by Lady Arbella Stuart.
- July 25 – The formal coronation of James I as King of England takes place at Westminster Abbey. Ceremonies are limited because of plague.
- August 17 – The Accademia dei Lincei, the oldest scientific academy in the world, is founded in Rome by Federico Cesi.
- September 20
  - Samuel Champlain arrives back in France.
  - Ottoman–Safavid War (1603–1618): Led by Iranian Emperor Abbas the Great, the Safavid Army of Iran stages a surprise attack on Tabriz, which had been taken from the Safavids by the Ottoman Empire in 1588. Tabriz is recaptured after 29 days.

=== October–December ===
- October 6 – On the Philippine island of Luzon, the Sangley Rebellion against Spanish rule ends with the massacre of 20,000 Sangley Chinese residents in Manila.
- October 18 – Yemişçi Hasan Pasha, the Grand Vizier of the Ottoman Empire, is executed on orders of Sultan Mehmed III, after failing to respond more quickly to the Safavid Empire's actions to take Tabriz. The Sultan appoints Yavuz Ali Pasha, the Ottoman Governor of Egypt to replace Yemişçi Hasan.
- October 21 – Ottoman–Safavid War (1603–1618): The Safavid Army of Iran, led by Emperor Abbas the Great, recaptures Tabriz from the Ottoman Empire after 15 years of Ottoman occupation.
- November 15 – Having recaptured Tabriz from the Ottoman Empire, Abbas the Great leads the Safavids in a siege of Yerevan.
- November 17 – Sir Walter Raleigh goes on trial for treason, in the converted Great Hall of Winchester Castle. He is found guilty, but his life is spared by King James I at this time, and he is returned to imprisonment in the Tower of London.
- November – Rokugō rebellion: More than 1,000 rōnin rebel in support of their exiled lord, Onodera Yoshimichi, in Japan.
- December 22 – Sultan Mehmed III of the Ottoman Empire dies, and is succeeded by his son Ahmed I.
- December 29 – Yavuz Ali Pasha, who had been appointed by Mehmed III in October as Grand Vizier of the Ottoman Empire, arrives at Constantinople to begin service. He dies from illness seven months later.

=== Ongoing events ===
- Russian famine of 1601–1603.

=== Date unknown ===
- A rebellion breaks out in Transylvania.
- French Huguenot Pierre de Gua is granted royal permission to settle in North America, founding the colony of Acadia.
- Yaqob is deposed as Emperor of Ethiopia for the first time by Za Sellase, who appoints his cousin Za Dengel to replace him.
- Johann Bayer publishes the star atlas Uranometria, the first to cover the entire celestial sphere.
- Japanese female entertainer Izumo no Okuni originates kabuki dance drama in Kyoto.
- The earliest of eight companies that will eventually merge to form the Kikkoman Corporation, the producers of soy sauce, is founded in Japan.

== Births ==
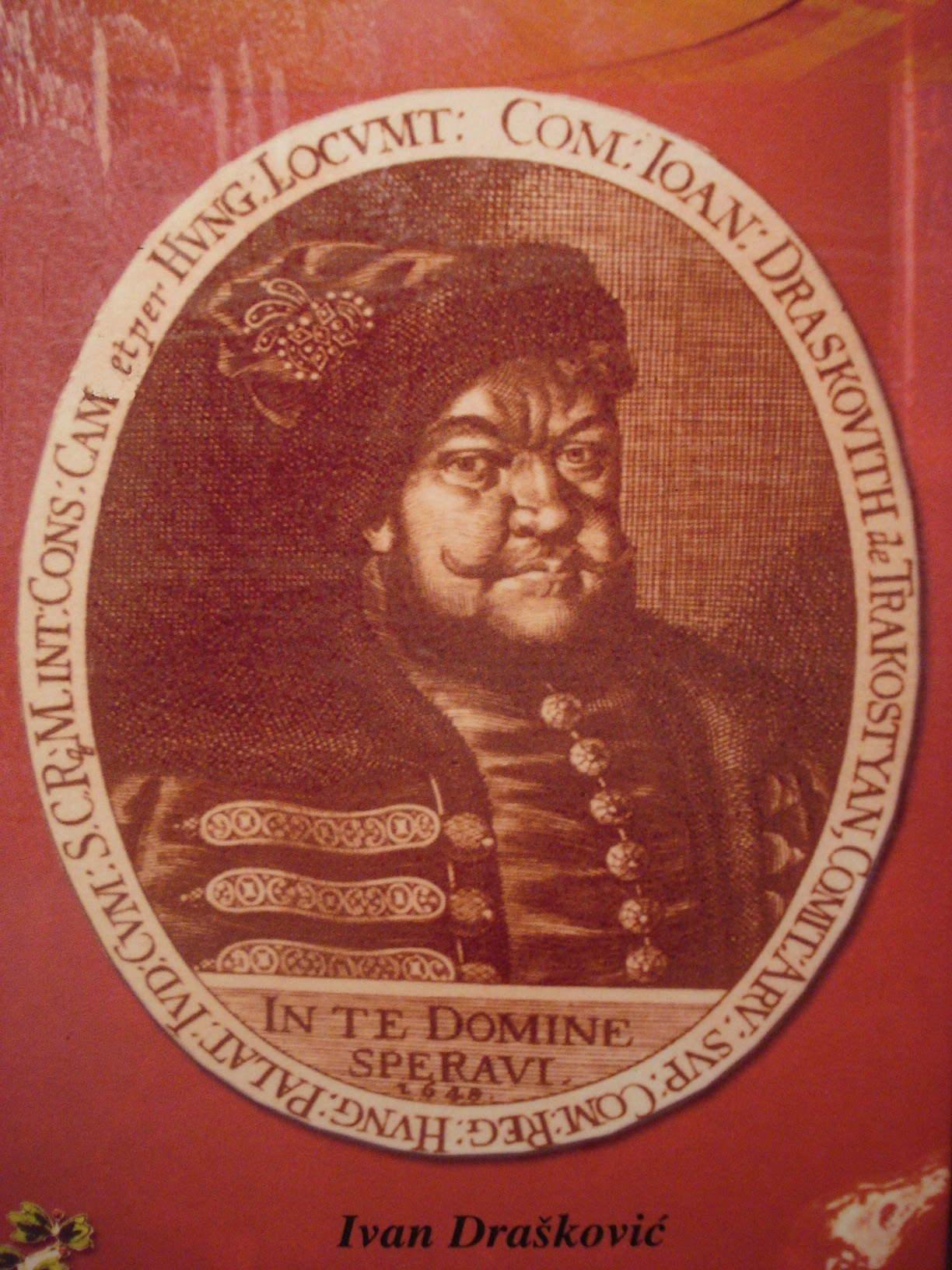
Ivan III Drašković

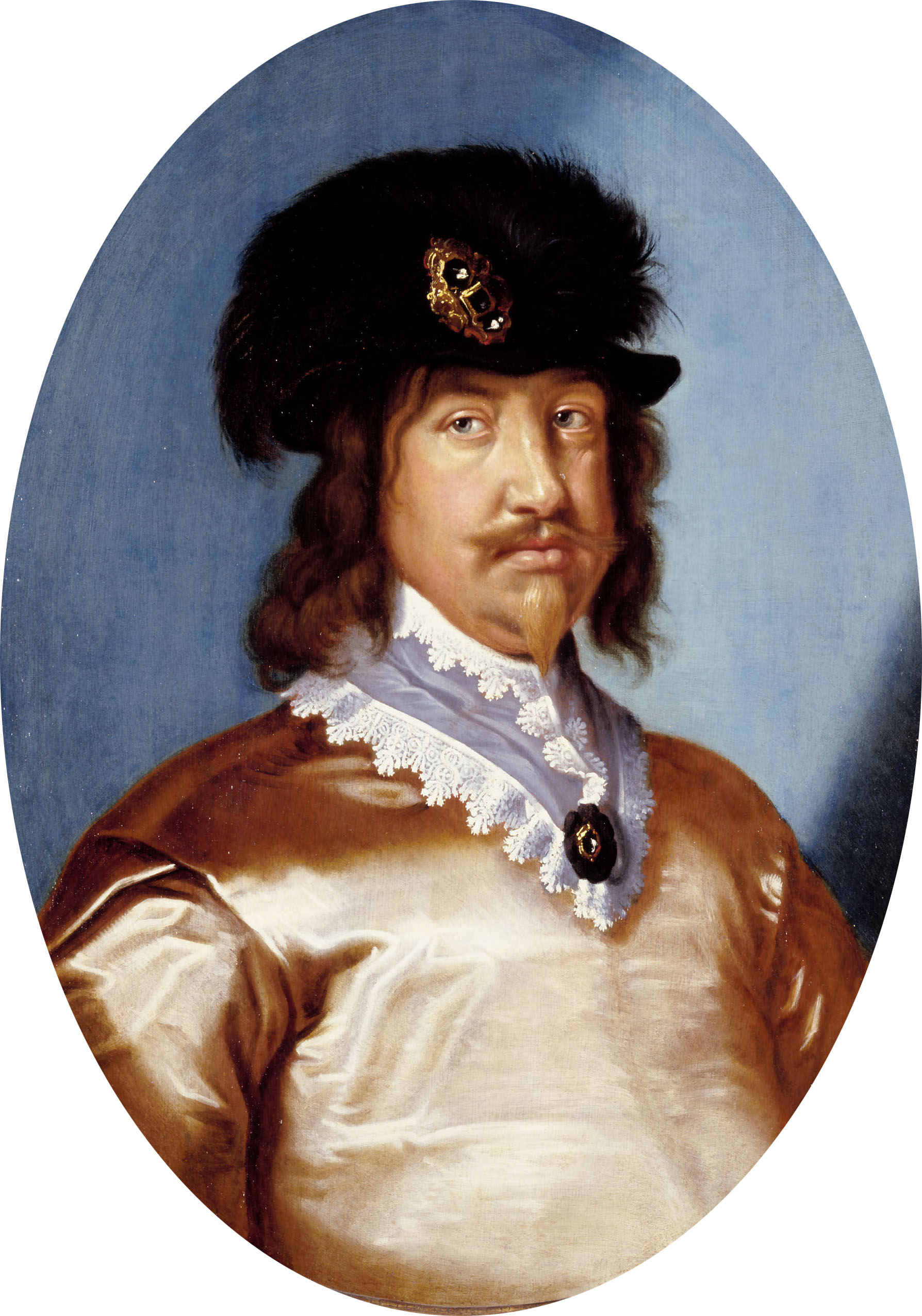
Christian, Prince-Elect of Denmark

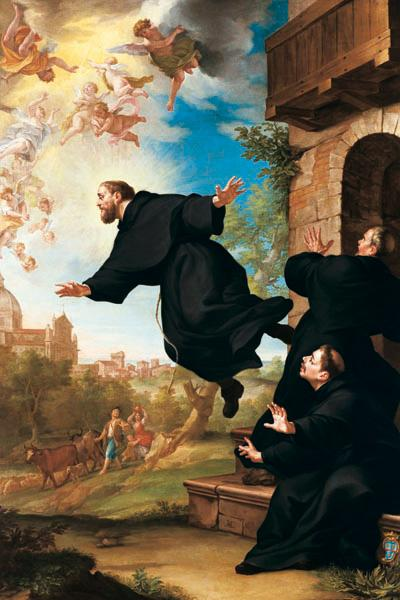
Joseph of Cupertino

=== January–March ===
- January 3 – Paul Stockmann, German hymnwriter (d. 1636)
- January 27
  - Sir Harbottle Grimston, 2nd Baronet, English lawyer and politician, Speaker in 1660 (d. 1685)
  - Humphrey Mackworth, English politician, lawyer and judge (d. 1654)
- January 30 – David Denicke, German jurist and hymnwriter (d. 1680)
- January – Shackerley Marmion, English dramatist (d. 1639)
- February 2 – Louise de Bourbon, French noble (d. 1637)
- February 7 – Friederich Stellwagen, German organ builder (d. 1660)
- February 12 – Friedrich Wilhelm II, Duke of Saxe-Altenburg (1639–1669) (d. 1669)
- March 2 – Pietro Novelli, Italian painter (d. 1647)
- March 13 – Ivan III Drašković, Croatian nobleman and soldier (d. 1648)
- March 18 – Simon Bradstreet, English colonial magistrate (d. 1697)
- March 21 bapt. – Samuel Luke, English politician (d. 1670)

=== April–June ===
- April 6 – Simon Paulli, Danish physician (d. 1680)
- April 10 – Christian, Prince-Elect of Denmark (d. 1647)
- April 19 – Michel le Tellier, French statesman (d. 1685)
- April 21 – Chamaraja Wodeyar VI, King of Mysore (d. 1637)
- April 24 – Thomas Allen, English politician (d. 1681)
- May 18 – Herbert Croft, English churchman (d. 1691)
- June 3 – Pietro Paolini, Italian painter (d. 1681)
- June 17 – Joseph of Cupertino, Italian saint (d. 1663)
- June 24 – Maria Overlander van Purmerland, Dutch noble (d. 1678)

=== July–September ===
- July 11
  - Sibylle Christine of Anhalt-Dessau, Princess of Anhalt-Dessau (d. 1686)
  - Kenelm Digby, English privateer and alchemist (d. 1665)
- July 12 – Edward Benlowes, English poet (d. 1676)
- July 23 – Axel Lillie, Swedish soldier and politician (d. 1662)
- July 27 – Alonso de Ovalle, Chilean priest and historian (d. 1651)
- August 9 – Johannes Cocceius, Dutch theologian (d. 1669)
- August 17 – Lennart Torstensson, Swedish Field Marshal, Privy Councillour and Governor-General (d. 1651)
- August 24 – Abu al-Ghazi Bahadur, Khan of Khiva, historian (d. 1663)
- September 10 – Henri Valois, French historian (d. 1676)
- September 14 – John Vaughan, Welsh judge (d. 1674)
- September 15 – Tokugawa Yorifusa, Japanese nobleman (d. 1661)

=== October–December ===
- October 2 – Sir John Yonge, 1st Baronet, English politician (d. 1663)
- October 20 – Simon de Vos, Flemish painter (d. 1676)
- November 10 – Agneta de Graeff van Polsbroek, Dutch noble (d. 1656)
- November 16 – Augustyn Kordecki, Polish prior of the Jasna Góra Monastery (d. 1673)
- November 24 – John, Count of Nassau-Idstein (1629–1677) (d. 1677)
- December 21
  - Jean de Launoy, French historian (d. 1678)
  - Roger Williams, English theologian and colonist (d. 1684)

=== Date unknown ===
- Abel Janszoon Tasman, Dutch seafarer and explorer (d. 1659)
- Louis Abelly, French monk and priest (d. 1691)
- Margareta Brahe, Swedish noble (d. 1669)
- John Ashburnham, English Member of Parliament (d. 1671)
- Daniel Blagrave, English Member of Parliament (d. 1668)
- Valentin Conrart, one of the founders of the Académie française (d. 1675)
- Denis Gaultier, French lutenist and composer (d. 1672)

=== Probable ===
- Aernout van der Neer, Dutch painter (d. 1677)
- Alexandre de Prouville, French statesman and soldier (d. 1670)
- William Stone, Colonial governor of Maryland (d. c. 1660)

== Deaths ==
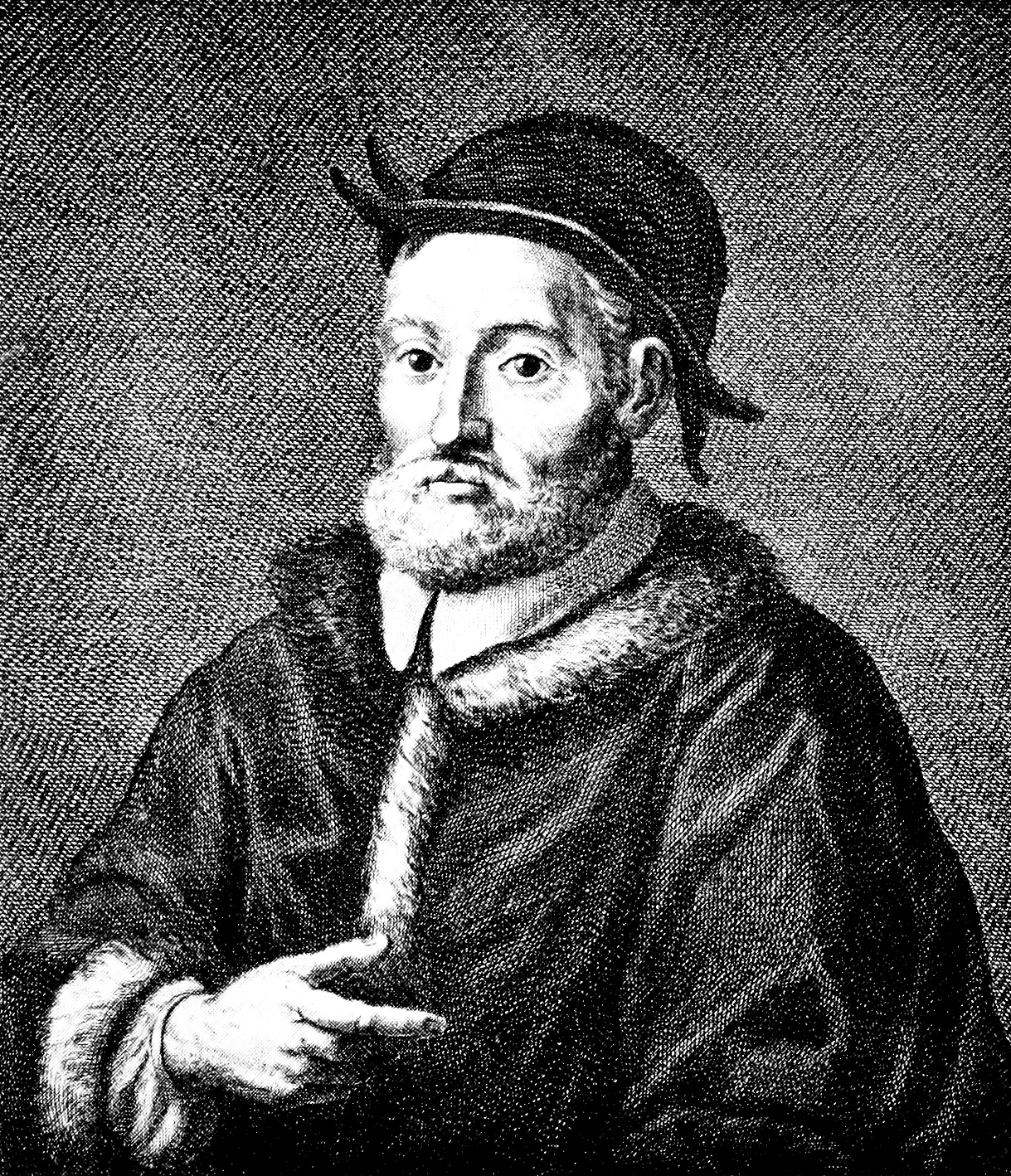
Andrea Cesalpino

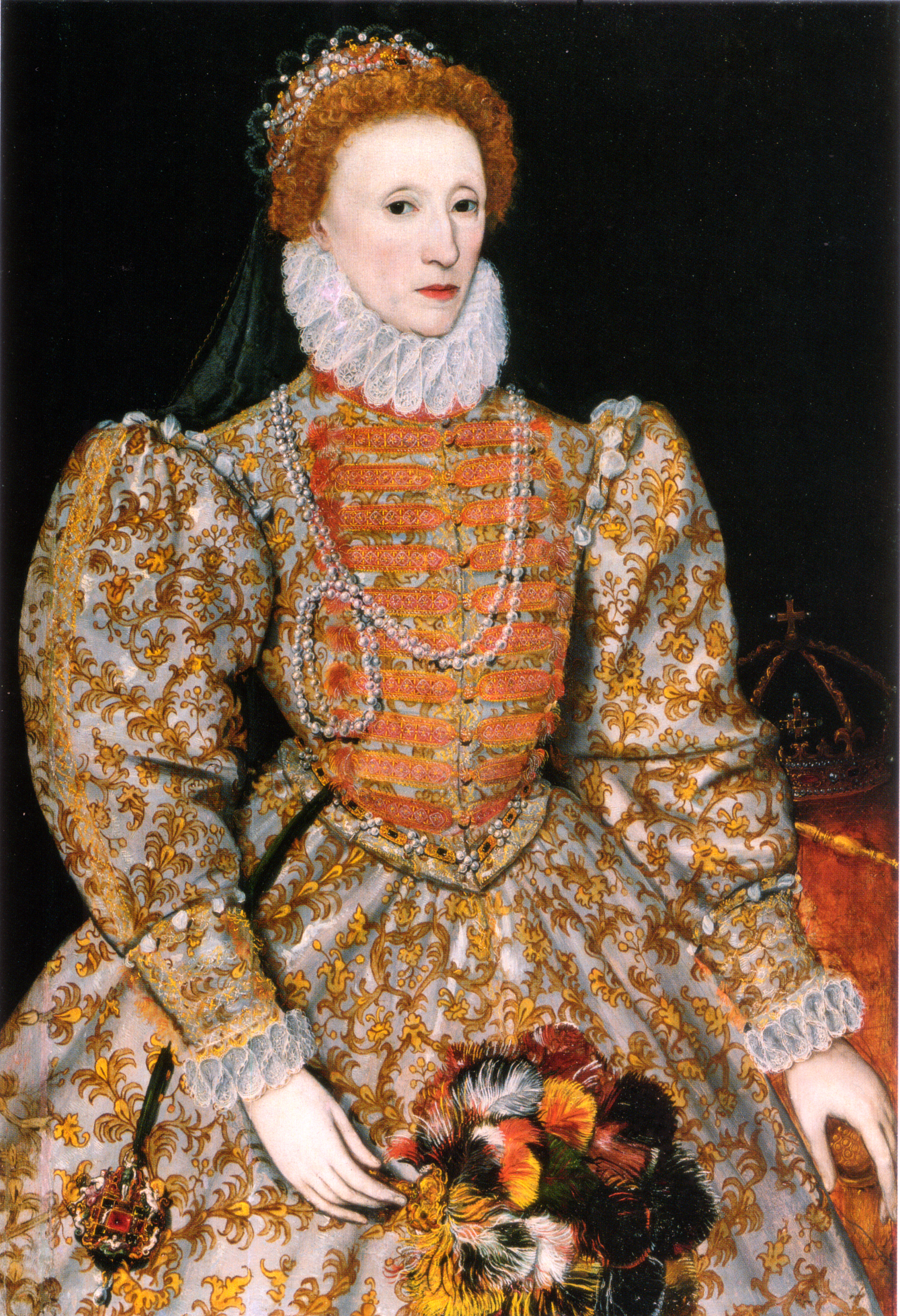
Elizabeth I

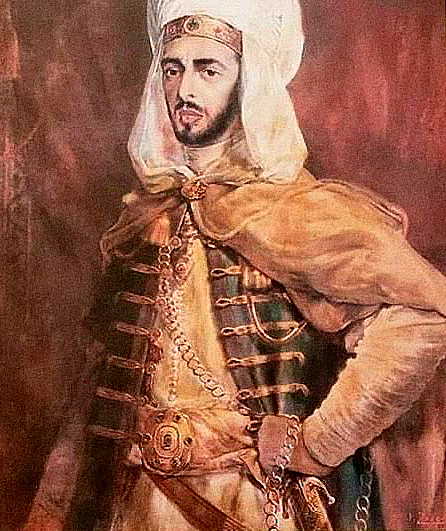
Ahmad al-Mansur

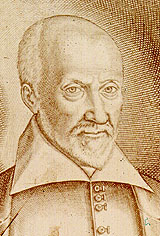
Pierre Charron

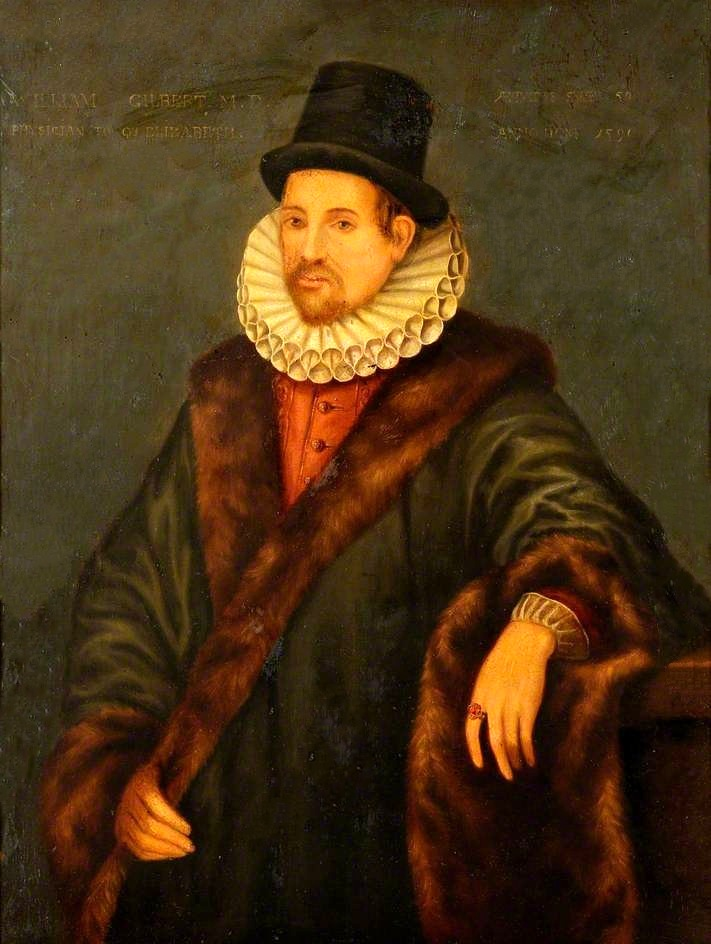
William Gilbert

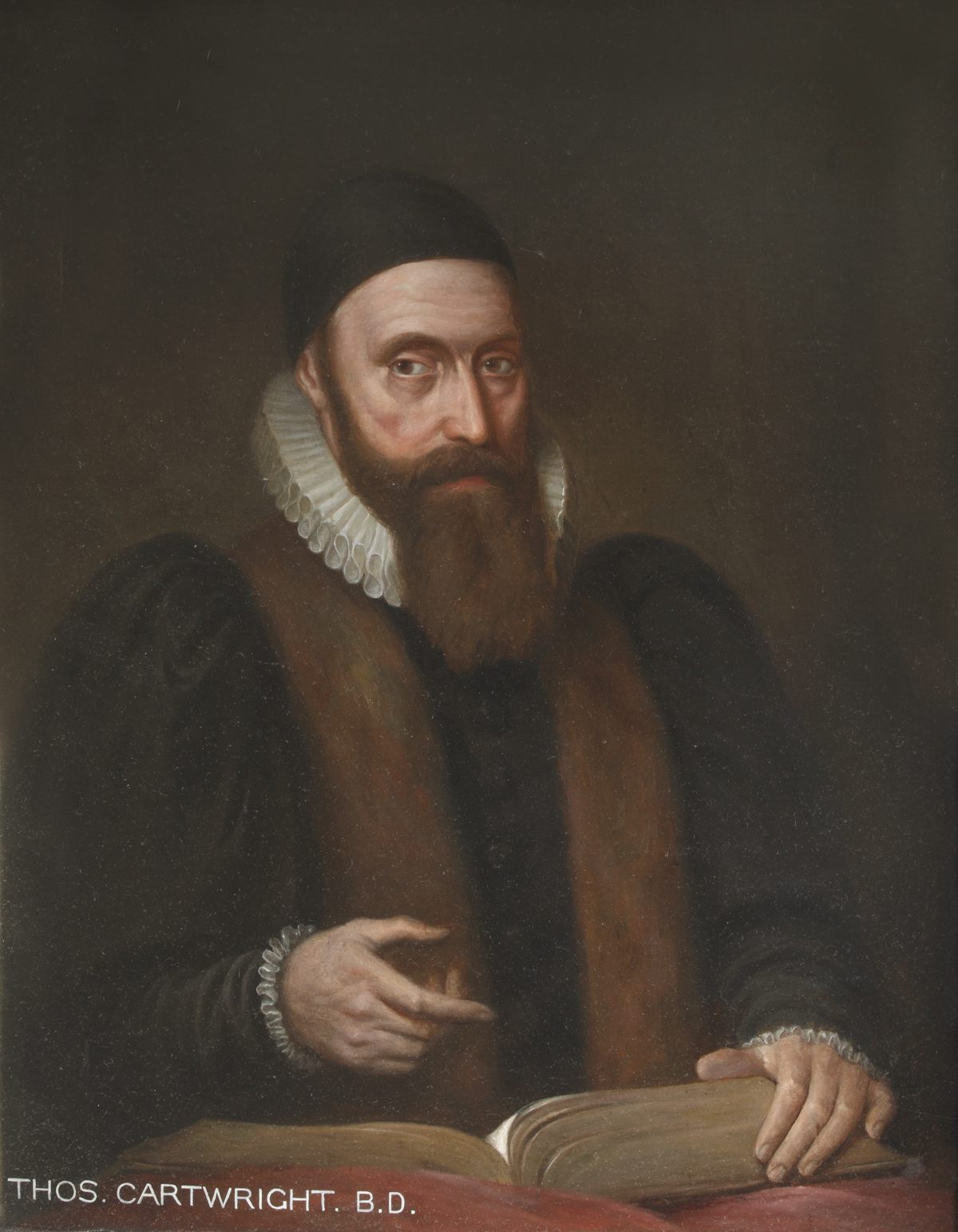
Thomas Cartwright

=== January–March ===
- January 21 – Kim Myŏngwŏn, Korean politician (b. 1534)
- January 25 – Francesco Zirano, Italian priest, member of the Order of Friars Minor (b. 1564)
- February 7
  - Bartholomäus Sastrow, German politician (b. 1520)
  - Hermann Wilken, German humanist and mathematician (b. 1522)
- February 23
  - Andrea Cesalpino, Italian philosopher, physician and botanist (b. 1519)
  - Franciscus Vieta, French mathematician (b. 1540)
- February 26 – Maria of Austria, Holy Roman Empress, spouse of Maximilian II (b. 1528)
- March 14 – Ulrich, Duke of Mecklenburg-Güstrow (1555–1603) (b. 1527)
- March 22 – Robert Seton, 1st Earl of Winton, Scottish peer who supported Mary, Queen of Scots (b. 1553)
- March 24 – Queen Elizabeth I of England (b. 1533)
- March 25 – Ikoma Chikamasa, Japanese warlord (b. 1526)

=== April–June ===
- April 4 – Aegidius Hunnius, German theologian (b. 1550)
- April 25 – George Frederick, Margrave of Brandenburg-Ansbach (b. 1539)
- May 4
  - Juraj IV Zrinski, Count of Croatia (b. 1549)
  - Stephan Praetorius, German theologian (b. 1536)
- May 14 – Magnus II, Duke of Saxe-Lauenburg, German duke (b. 1543)
- June – Baldassare Donato, Italian composer and singer (b. 1525)
- June 2
  - Tanneke Sconyncx, Alleged Flemish witch (b. 1560)
  - Bernard of Wąbrzeźno, Roman Catholic priest and a Benedictine monk from the Benedictine Abbey in Lubiń (b. 1575)
- June 27 – Jan Dymitr Solikowski, Polish archbishop, writer, and diplomat (b. 1539)

=== July–September ===
- July 4 – Philippe de Monte, Flemish composer (b. 1521)
- July 10 – Joan Terès i Borrull, viceroy of Catalonia (b. 1538)
- July 11 – Richard Drake, English courtier (b. 1535)
- July 17
  - János Jacobinus, Hungarian politician (b. 1574)
  - Mózes Székely, Hungarian noble (b. 1553)
- July 23 – Santi di Tito, Italian painter (b. 1536)
- August 1 – Matthew Browne, English politician (b. 1563)
- August 2 – John Townshend, English politician (b. 1568)
- August 16 – Silvio Antoniano, Italian Catholic cardinal (b. 1540)
- August 25
  - Ahmad al-Mansur, Sultan of the Saadi Dynasty (b. 1549)
  - Jan Zborowski, Polish noble (b. 1538)
- August 26 – Thomas Drury, English government informer and swindler (b. 1551)
- September 1 – Barnim X, Duke of Pomerania-Stettin (1569–1603) (b. 1549)
- September 9 – George Carey, 2nd Baron Hunsdon, English politician (b. 1547)
- September 19 – Matsudaira Iemoto, Japanese samurai (b. 1548)

=== October–December ===
- October – Ralph Lane, English explorer (b. 1530)
- October 6 – Jakob Monau, Polish writer and linguist (b. 1546)
- October 18 – Edward Stafford, 3rd Baron Stafford, English baron (b. 1535)
- October 23 – Johann Wanning, Dutch composer, kapellmeister, and singer (b. 1537)
- October 26 – Otto II, Duke of Brunswick-Harburg (1549–1603) (b. 1528)
- October 27 – Irina Godunova, Russian tsarina (b. 1557)
- November 12 – John VII, Count of Oldenburg (1573–1603) and Delmenhorst (1573–1597) (b. 1540)
- November 16 – Pierre Charron, French 16th-century Catholic theologian and philosopher (b. 1541)
- November 18 – Elisabeth of Nassau-Dillenburg, Dutch countess, sister of William the Silent (b. 1542)
- November 20 – Krzysztof Mikołaj "the Thunderbolt" Radziwiłł, Polish nobleman (b. 1547)
- November 30 – William Gilbert, English scientist (plague) (b. 1544)
- December 4 – Maerten de Vos, Flemish painter and draughtsman (b. 1532)
- December 5 – George Brooke, English aristocrat (b. 1568)
- December 8 – Girolamo Mattei, Italian Catholic cardinal (b. 1547)
- December 9 – William Watson, English conspirator (b. 1559)
- December 22 – Mehmed III, Ottoman Sultan (b. 1566)
- December 27 – Thomas Cartwright, English Puritan churchman (b. 1535)
- December 28 – John Joscelyn, English clergyman and antiquarian as well as secretary to Matthew Parker (b. 1529)

=== Date unknown ===
- Edward Fenton, English navigator
- Oleksander Ostrogski, Polish nobleman (b. 1571)

=== Approximate date ===
- Gráinne O'Malley, Irish chieftain and pirate (b. 1530)
- King Idris Alooma of the Kanem-Bornu Empire
- Will Kempe, English comic performer
