= Patriarch Atanasije =

Patriarch Atanasije may refer to:

- Atanasije I, Archbishop of Peć and Serbian Patriarch, head of the Serbian Orthodox Church, from 1711 until 1712
- Atanasije II Gavrilović, Archbishop of Peć and Serbian Patriarch from 1747 to 1752
