= Kuyucu Murad Pasha =

Grand Vizier of the Ottoman Empire from 1606 to 1611

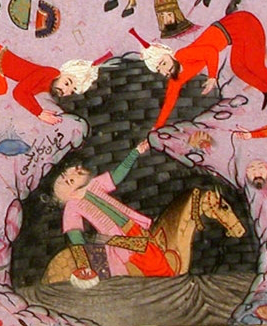
- Capture of Murad Pasha by the Safavids, from a well he had fallen into, in 1585, during the Ottoman–Safavid War (1578–1590). Şecāʿatnāme, 1586.

Grand Vizier of the Ottoman Empire
- In office 9 December 1606 – 5 August 1611
- Monarch: Ahmed I
- Preceded by: Boşnak Derviş Mehmed Pasha
- Succeeded by: Nasuh Pasha

Personal details
- Born: 1530 Ottoman Bosnia
- Died: 1611 (aged 80–81) Diyarbakır

Kuyucu Murad Pasha (Ottoman Turkish for "Murad Pasha the Well-digger", i.e. "Gravedigger"; Serbo-Croatian: Murat-paša Kujudžić; 1530 – 1611) was an Ottoman Bosnian statesman who served as Grand Vizier of the Ottoman Empire during the reign of Ahmed I from 9 December 1606 to 5 August 1611. He was also called "Koca Murad Pasha". The nickname "Kuyucu" is said to have been either from his ruthless suppression of Celali rebellions by beheading rebels and stuffing their heads down wells, or him falling into a well and being taken prisoner in battle.

== Early life ==
He was born in Ottoman Bosnia in 1530. As a young boy of South Slavic origin he was converted to Islam and went through the Devshirme conscription process.

== Career ==
He was beylerbey (governor-general) of Karaman in 1585. During the Ottoman–Safavid War (1578–1590), he participated in Özdemiroğlu Osman Pasha's Tabriz campaign. During a military retreat from the Safavid forces under Hamza Mirza, he fell into a deep well with his horse. He was taken prisoner and sent to the prison of Alamut Castle. He was released following the Ottoman-Safavid Treaty of 998 (1590), and returned to Istanbul.

He was later governor of Cyprus before being appointed to Damascus in 1593, as well as Aleppo. Upon arriving at the port of Sidon to take up his Damascus office he was received by the Druze chieftain of the Chouf, Fakhr al-Din, who furnished him with numerous gifts. He reciprocated by appointing Fakhr al-Din sanjak-bey (district governor) of Sidon-Beirut. Murad Pasha and Fakhr al-Din eliminated the latter's rival Mansur ibn Furaykh, the leader of a local Sunni Muslim Bedouin clan and onetime sanjak-bey of Safad.

He participated in the Long Turkish War and impressed Mehmed III in particular at the Siege of Eger (1596) after which he became military commander of Ottoman Hungary for a while.

=== Grand vizierate ===
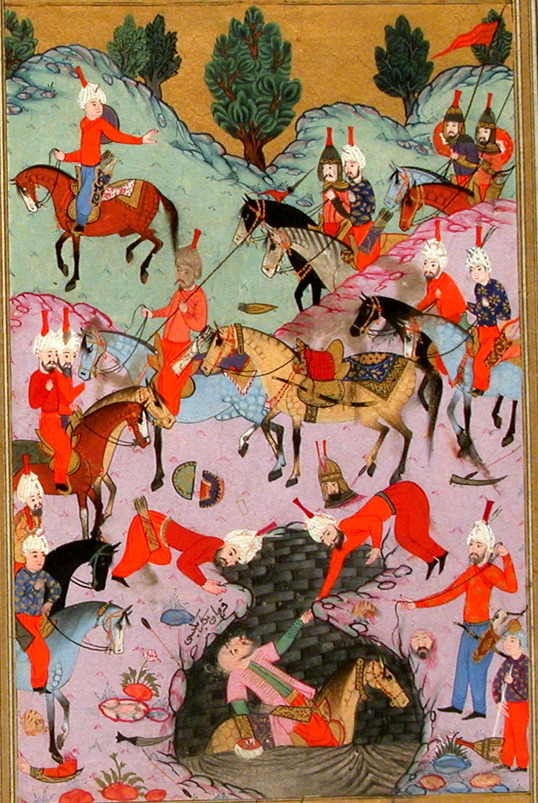
Full scene of the capture of Kuyucu Murad Pasha by the Safavids in 1585. Şecāʿatnāme, 1586

Following the dispatch of Grand Vizier Dervish Pasha to the Safavid front, Murad Pasha was appointed grand vizier and oversaw the Peace of Zsitvatorok in Hungary in the summer of 1606. By then, he had accumulated around seven decades of government and military service under five successive sultans. According to the historian William Griswold, Murad Pasha "represented the traditional devsirme warrior class, a Serb with the fanaticism to lead his troops to the limits of their endurance for Islam and the sultan".

==== Suppression of Janbulad rebellion ====
Imperial alarm grew at the power of the rebel Kurdish chieftain and beylerbey of Aleppo, Ali Janbulad, who in 1606 had extended his control over the eyalets of Tripoli and Damascus and formed a secret alliance with the Duke of Tuscany. Ali's rise coincided with the failed Tuscan expedition against Chios in 1607 and the strengthening of the Celali revolts in Anatolia. Murad Pasha was appointed to sort the significant challenges to imperial power. He determined that a further year of revolt would cement the power of the Celali chiefs of Anatolia and of the Janbulads in Cilicia and northern Syria, with the possible direct support of the Safavids.

Murad Pasha resolved first to suppress Janbulad's rebellion, though kept his plans secret to maintain the element of surprise. At the time, Janbulad was not officially considered a rebel despite his usurpation of power in Aleppo, expeditions throughout Syria and foreign ties. Murad Pasha framed the target of his campaign to be the Safavids and the Anatolian Celali rebels en route to Iran; such campaigns had been undertaken in the preceding years by his predecessors. Unlike his predecessor Ferhad Pasha, Murad Pasha had full control of the Ottoman armies, including the Rumelis whom he freed up by negotiating the Peace of Zsitvatorok, and was in the position to initiate military action and make direct call to arms throughout the Empire. The most trusted core of his army consisted of the Balkan veterans of the Danubian front led by Tiryaki Hasan Pasha. His Anatolian troops nearly all had connections to varying degrees with the Celali rebels and were put under the command of the veteran Balkan general Maryol Huseyn Pasha and backed up by two ex-Celali leaders who had proven their loyalty to the Ottomans: Zulfiqar Pasha, the sanjakbey of Marash, and Karakas Ahmed Pasha. Before March, Murad Pasha called on the sanjak-beys and beylerbeys to provision men, munitions, transport animals, grain, road repairs and bridge preparations.

In early July, Murad Pasha disembarked from Üsküdar and marched through Maltepe, Tuzla and Gebze. Fear of his army compelled minor Celali chiefs to submit; the grand vizier treated those he considered less dangerous with favorable treatment to spread the message to others that submission would spare and reward them, while those who he considered threatening were executed. To the latter category belonged the well-known Celali Akmirza who was decapitated whilst pledging loyalty to Murad Pasha at Afyon. Upon arriving in Konya he revealed that Janbulad was the target of the campaign, not Iran, and the hasty and arduous march deep through Celali Anatolia was meant to avoid counter movements by Janbulad or his allies. The last major obstacle on his way to Janbulad's sphere of influence was the most powerful Celali chief Kalenderoğlu Mehmed Pasha. The latter and another major Celali chief, Kara Said, had offered to join Murad Pasha's army, but the grand vizier had no use for aggrandizing his army with Celali rebels who could defect to Janbulad mid-battle and threaten his rear. Instead, he neutralized Kalenderoglu, who long sought high government office, by appointing him beylerbey of Ankara.

Before departing Konya the grand vizier sent orders to Janbulad and Cemsid, the Celali chief of Adana and Tarsus in Cilicia demanding their loyalty. He sought control of Adana and the mountain passes of the Taurus range, which guarded Janbulad's northern Syrian heartland. Murad Pasha's army stormed Cemsid's position at Tekir Beli, routing his 2,000 sekban. Murad Pasha proceeded through the Cilician Gates to Adana, where he confiscated a significant payment that had been sent to Cemsid probably by Janbulad.

He led an army of well-paid, local non-Anatolians and Devshirme (forcibly recruited Balkan Christian converts to Islam) which defeated Ali Janbulad, a leader of the Celali revolts against the Ottomans in Aleppo, in 1607 near Lake Amik. Janbulad and Fakhr al-Din allied and defeated the Ottoman governor of Damascus and looted the city two years prior, but Fakhr al-Din had dissociated from Janbulad by the time of Murad Pasha's expedition and sent the grand vizier 300,000 piasters and his young son Ali as a hostage to win his favor; Murad Pasha pardoned Fakhr al-Din.

==== Celali campaign ====
En route to Syria, Murad Pasha had appointed Kalenderoglu Mehmed, a Celali rebel chief, governor of Ankara Sanjak, but the people of Ankara denied him entry and he proceeded to raid Bursa. After Kalenderoglu departed the vicinity of Bursa in the summer of 1608, Murad Pasha, departing from Syria, attempted to intercept him in west central Anatolia. With reinforcements from Constantinople Murad Pasha defeated Kalenderoglu in a deep Taurus mountain pass near Adana on 5 August. His victory, despite logistical challenges, was attributed to "his skill and experience as a military commander and his ability to hold the loyalty of his army" by the historian Caroline Finkel.

About 10,000 surviving Celali rebels, including Kalenderoglu and his band, fled into Safavid Iranian territory in eastern Anatolia. Rather than a full-scale assault into Iranian territory during peace between the Ottomans and Safavids, Murad Pasha sent detachments under his lieutenants against various Celali commanders. They were eventually killed with their fighters, including Kalenderoglu, by May 1610, after which surviving rebels were incorporated as an elite cavalry force of the Ottomans. In stamping out the Celali revolts Murad Pasha "achieved a victory that had eluded the Ottomans for years" according to Finkel. He received a ceremonious welcome on his return to Constantinople. Murad Pasha's nickname Kuyucu (the Well-digger, i.e. the "grave-digger") derives from the mass graves he had dug to bury the condemned of the harsh methods he employed in order to suppress (and eventually put an end) to the Celali revolts. Tens of thousands of Turks, Kurds and other Muslims were killed during Murad Pasha's office in his several campaigns against separate large rebel groups.

== Death and legacy ==
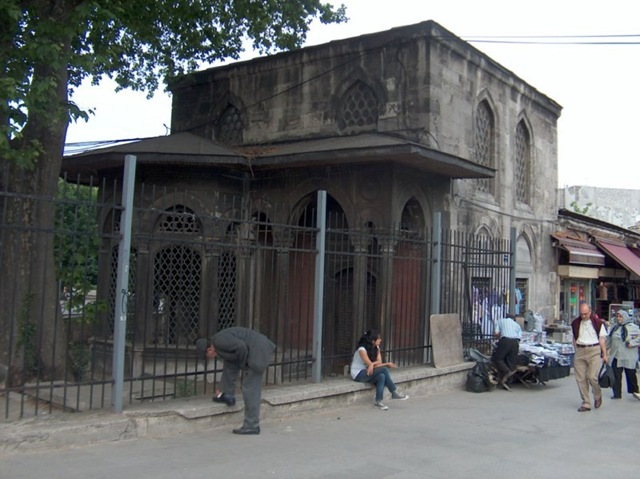
The blackened entrance to Kuyucu Murad Pasha's mausoleum

Murad Pasha died in 1611 in Diyarbakır during the Ottoman–Safavid War (1603–1618).

Murad Pasha had a complex built in Istanbul, about 300 meters northwest of the Bayezid II Mosque on the Third Hill of Istanbul. The complex also includes Murad Pasha's mausoleum where he was buried after his death in 1611, the walls of whose entrance gate have become darkened due to time. Cleanup on the building has been halted, leading to its current state, because of strong reactions by several Anatolian groups, such as Yörüks, Alevis, and Bektashis, against honoring Murad Pasha, who they hold responsible for killing thousands of members of their groups. Some have suggested that the mausoleum be made into a museum for the massacres and called the government's intention to conduct repairs on the building "shameful" in light of Murad Pasha's legacy. However, Karen Barkey suggests that Murad Pasha's methods were standard for the time and were often equalled or exceeded by many predatory rebel leaders (bandits and bureaucrats).

In 1593 Murad Pasha built a souk in Damascus called the Qaysariyya Muradiyya after him at Bab al-Barid, the western entrance of the Umayyad Mosque. It consisted of a caravanserai, a coffeehouse and forty-seven shops. Its connection with the Umayyad Mosque was demonstrated by the construction of a large dome over its entrance on the remains of the Roman propylaeum of Jupiter. In the process of the souk's construction, Murad Pasha had existing buildings demolished. The souk's revenues were a waqf (religious endowment) designated for the poor of Mecca and Medina.

== See also ==
- List of Ottoman grand viziers

== Bibliography ==
- Abu-Husayn, Abdul-Rahim (1985). Provincial Leaderships in Syria, 1575-1650. Beirut: American University of Beirut. ISBN 9780815660729.
- Bakhit, Muhammad Adnan Salamah (February 1972). The Ottoman Province of Damascus in the Sixteenth Century (PhD). School of Oriental and African Studies, University of London.
- Finkel, Caroline (2005). Osman's Dream: The History of the Ottoman Empire. London: John Murray Publishers. ISBN 978-0-465-02396-7.
- Griswold, William J. (1983). The Great Anatolian Rebellion, 1000-1020/1591-1611. Berlin: Klaus Schwarz. ISBN 3-922968-34-1.
- Griswold, W. (2004). "Djalālī". In Bearman, P. J.; Bianquis, Th.; Bosworth, C. E.; van Donzel, E. & Heinrichs, W. P. (eds.). The Encyclopaedia of Islam, Second Edition. Volume XII: Supplement. Leiden: E. J. Brill. pp. 238–239. ISBN 978-90-04-13974-9.
- Harris, William (2012). Lebanon: A History, 600–2011. New York: Oxford University Press. ISBN 978-0-19-518-111-1.
- Kafescioğlu, Çiğdem (1999). ""In the Image of Rūm": Ottoman Architectural Patronage in Sixteenth-Century Damascus and Aleppo". In Necipoğlu, Gülru (ed.). Muqarnas: An Annual on the Visual Culture of the Islamic World, Volume 16. Leiden: Brill. pp. 70–96. ISBN 90-04-11482-3.
- Kortepeter, Carl Max (2011). "Complex plans of the Ottomans, Persians and Muscovites in the Caucasus, 1578–1640". In Mitchell, Colin P. (ed.). New Perspectives on Safavid Iran: Empire and Society. Abingdon, Oxon: Routledge. pp. 59–83. ISBN 978-0-415-77462-8.
- Rihawi, Abdulqader (1977). Damascus: Its History, Development and Artistic Heritage. Translated by Paul E. Cheveden. Damascus.

Political offices
Preceded by Dervish Mehmed Pasha	Grand Vizier of the Ottoman Empire; 11 December 1606 – 5 August 1611	Succeeded by Nasuh Pasha
