= Ottoman Turks =

Turkic ethnic group

Osmanlı Türkleri
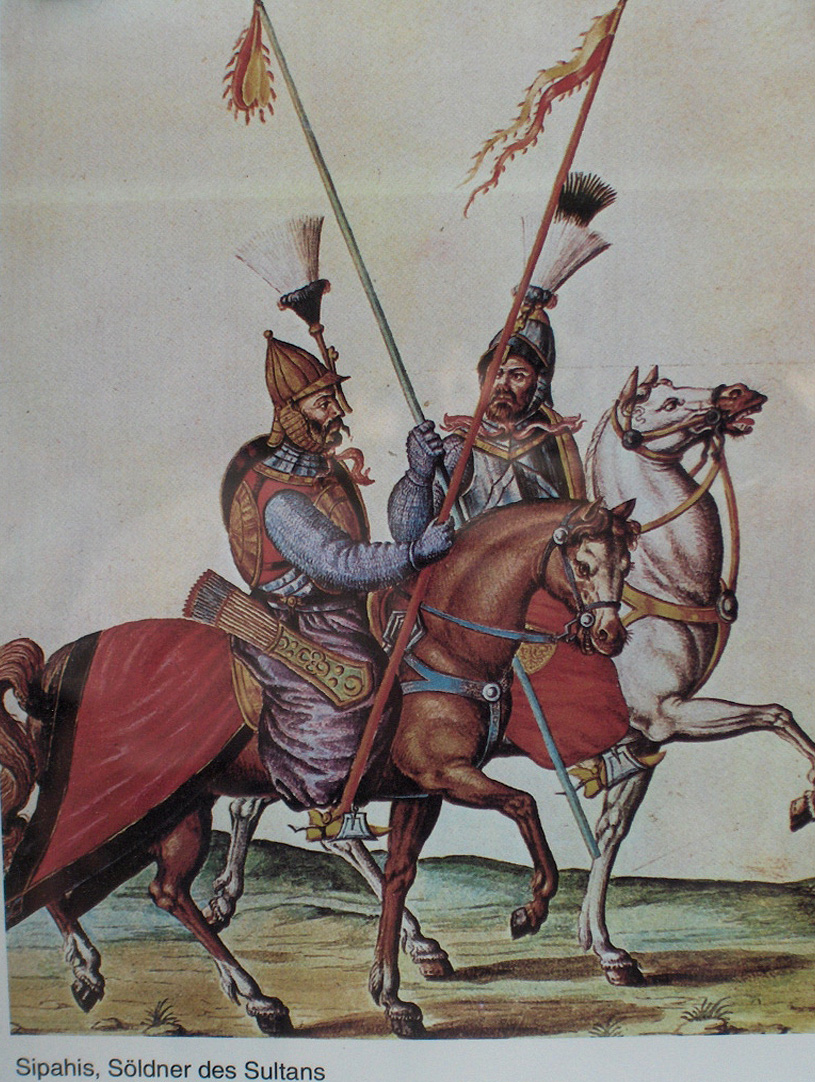
- Painting of Ottoman Turkish sipahis at the Battle of Vienna

Total population
- 15,044,846 (1914) (Note: Muslims of the Ottoman Empire, excluding the Vilayet of the Hejaz.); 12,590,352 (1884) (Note: Muslims of the Ottoman Empire, excluding the Vilayet of the Hejaz.); 7,000,000 (1831) (Note: Muslims of Anatolia and some parts of the Balkans.)

Regions with significant populations
- Ottoman Empire (esp. Anatolia and Balkans)

Languages
- Old Anatolian Turkish (Note: Among peasantry and non-elite urban population.); Ottoman Turkish (Note: In literature and by elites.)

Religion
- Majority: Sunni Islam (Hanafi); Minority: Alevism

Related ethnic groups
- Turkish people

The Ottoman Turks (Turkish: Osmanlı Türkleri) were an Oghuz Turkic ethnic group in Anatolia. Originally from Central Asia, they migrated to Anatolia in the 13th century and founded the Ottoman Empire, in which they remained socio-politically dominant for the entirety of the six centuries that it existed. Their descendants are the present-day Turkish people, who comprise the majority of the population in the Republic of Turkey, which was established shortly after the end of World War I.

Reliable information about the early history of the Ottoman Turks remains scarce, but they take their Turkish name Osmanlı from the Oghuz chieftain Osman I, who founded the House of Osman alongside the Ottoman Empire; the name "Osman" was altered to "Ottoman" when it was transliterated into some European languages over time. The Ottoman beylik, expanding from their base in Söğüt, gradually began incorporating other Turkish-speaking Muslims and non-Turkish Christians into their realm. By the 1350s, they had begun crossing into the Balkan Peninsula and eventually came to dominate the Mediterranean Sea. In 1453, the fall of Constantinople, which had served as the capital city of the Byzantine Empire, enabled the Ottoman Turks to control all major land routes between Asia and Europe. This development forced Western Europeans to find other ways to trade with Asians. Following the dissolution of the Ottoman Empire, the Ottoman Turkish identity ceased to exist; the Ottoman Turkish language, which was written using the Perso-Arabic script, developed into the modern Latinised Turkish language.

== History ==
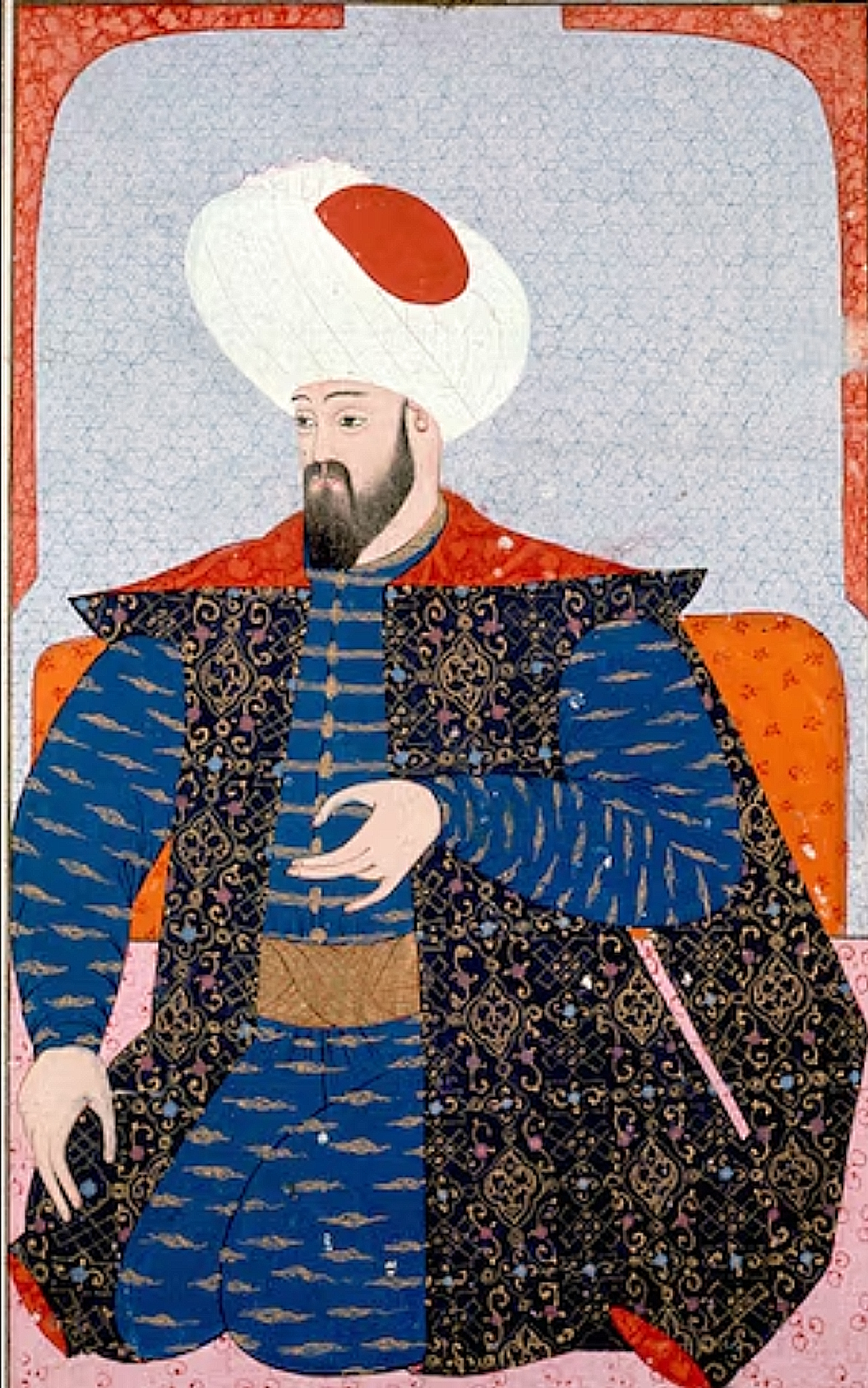
Ottoman miniature from 1579/1580 depicting Oghuz chieftain Osman I, who founded the House of Osman and the Ottoman Empire around 1299. Located at Topkapı Sarayı Müzesi in the city of Istanbul.

=== Migration to Anatolia from Central Asia ===
The Ottoman Turks first became known to the West in the 13th century, when they migrated from their homeland in Central Asia westward to the Seljuk Sultanate of Rum in Anatolia. The Ottoman Turks established a beylik in Northwestern Anatolia under Ertuğrul, the capital of which was Söğüt. Ertuğrul, leader of the nomadic Kayı tribe, first established a principality as part of the decaying Seljuk Empire. His son Osman expanded the principality; the polity and the people were named "Ottomans" by Europeans after him ("Ottoman" being a corruption of "Osman"). Osman's son Orhan expanded the growing realm into an empire, taking Nicaea (present-day İznik) and crossed the Dardanelles in 1362. All coins unearthed in Söğüt during the two centuries before Orhan bear the names of Ilkhanate rulers. The Seljuks were under the suzerainty of the Ilkhanate, and later the Turco-Mongol conqueror Tamerlane. The Ottoman Empire came into its own under Mehmed II, who captured the reduced Byzantine Empire's well-defended capital, Constantinople in 1453.

=== Ottoman Empire until World War I ===
The Ottoman Empire came to rule much of the Balkans, the Caucasus, the Middle East (excluding Iran), and North Africa over the course of several centuries, with an advanced army and navy. The Empire lasted until the end of the First World War, when it was defeated by the Allies and partitioned. Following the successful Turkish War of Independence that ended with the Turkish national movement retaking most of the land lost to the Allies, the movement abolished the Ottoman sultanate on November 1, 1922, and proclaimed the Republic of Turkey on October 29, 1923. The movement nullified the Treaty of Sèvres and negotiated the significantly more favourable Treaty of Lausanne (1923), assuring recognition of modern Turkish national borders, termed Misak-ı Milli (National Pact).

=== Definition of a Turk ===
Not all Ottoman Empire subjects were Muslims and not all Ottoman Muslims were Turks, but starting from 1924, every citizen of the newly found Turkish Republic became considered as "Turk". Article 88 of 1924 Constitution, which was based on the 1921 Constitution, states that the name Turk, as a political term, shall be understood to include all citizens of the Turkish Republic, without distinction of, or reference to race or religion.

== Culture ==
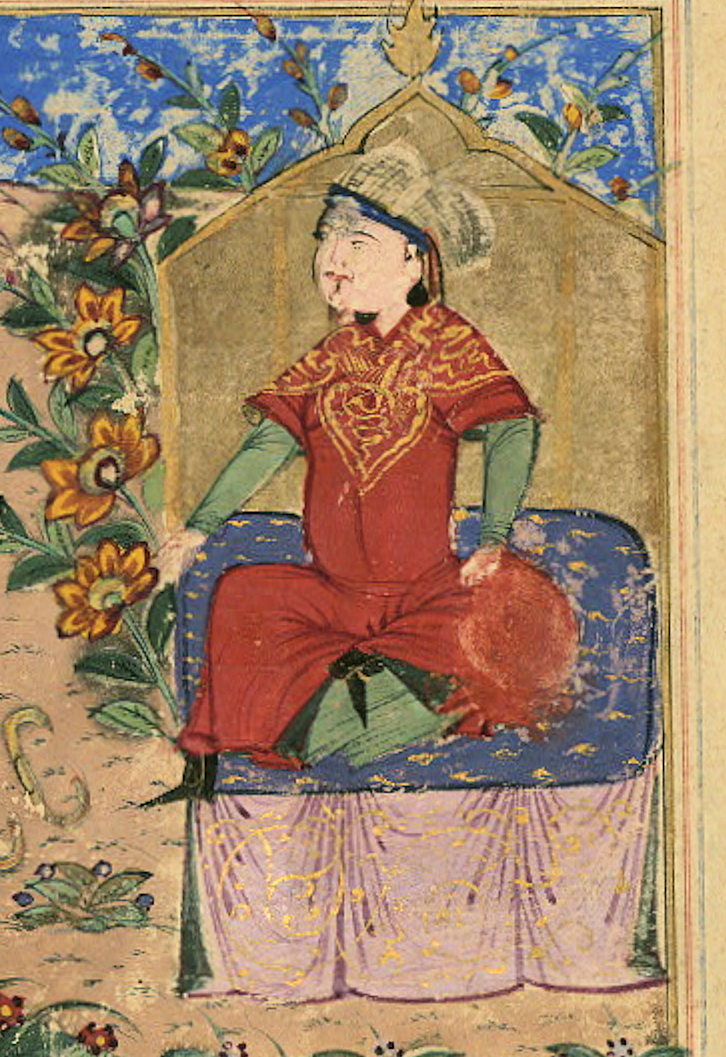
Oghuz Khagan in Mojmal al-Tawarikh, the legendary ancestor of Turkish tribes in Anatolia

The conquest of Constantinople began to make the Ottomans the rulers of one of the most profitable empires, connected to the flourishing Islamic cultures of the time, and at the crossroads of trade into Europe. The Ottomans made major developments in calligraphy, writing, law, architecture, and military science, and became the standard of opulence.

=== Calligraphy ===
Because Islam is a monotheistic religion that focuses heavily on learning the central text of the Quran and Islamic culture has historically tended towards discouraging or prohibiting figurative art, calligraphy became one of the foremost of the arts.

The early Yâkût period was supplanted in the late 15th century by a new style pioneered by Şeyh Hamdullah (1429–1520), which became the basis for Ottoman calligraphy, focusing on the Nesih version of the script, which became the standard for copying the Quran (see Islamic calligraphy).

The next great change in Ottoman calligraphy came from the style of Hâfiz Osman (1642–1698), whose rigorous and simplified style found favour with an empire at its peak of territorial extent and governmental burdens.

The late calligraphic style of the Ottomans was created by Mustafa Râkim (1757–1826) as an extension and reform of Osman's style, placing greater emphasis on technical perfection, which broadened the calligraphic art to encompass the sülüs script as well as the Nesih script.

=== Poetry ===
Ottoman poetry included epic-length verse but is better known for shorter forms such as the gazel. For example, the epic poet Ahmedi (-1412) is remembered for his Alexander the Great. His contemporary Sheykhi wrote verses on love and romance. Yaziji-Oglu produced a religious epic on Mohammed's life, drawing from the stylistic advances of the previous generation and Ahmedi's epic forms.

=== Painting ===
By the 14th century, the Ottoman Empire's prosperity made manuscript works available to merchants and craftsmen, and produced a flowering of miniatures that depicted pageantry, daily life, commerce, cities and stories, and chronicled events.

By the late 18th century, European influences in painting were clear, with the introduction of oils, perspective, figurative paintings, use of anatomy and composition.

== See also ==
- Ottoman Turkish alphabet
- Demographics of the Ottoman Empire
  - Ottoman Greeks
  - Ottoman Serbs
  - Ottoman Armenians
  - Ottoman Albanians
  - Ottoman Jews
  - Ottoman Bosniaks
  - Ottoman Kurds
  - Cretan Muslims
  - Circassians in the Empire
  - Arabs
