= Siege of Székesfehérvár (1602) =

- Part of the Long Turkish War
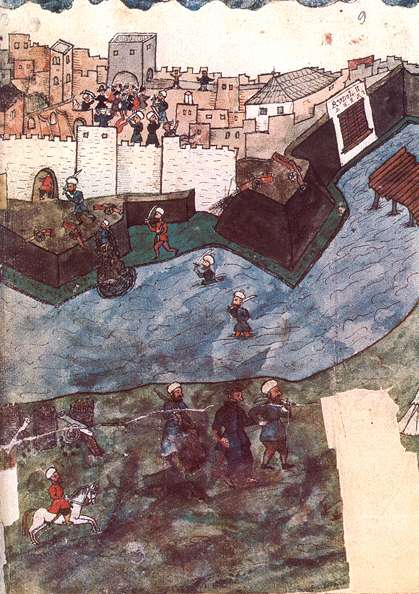
- Siege of Székesfehérvár (1602) drawing by wathay ferenc
Date	12 – 29 August 1602
Location	Székesfehérvár, Hungary
Result	Ottoman victory

Belligerents
(Holy Roman Empire) Habsburg Empire	Ottoman Empire

Commanders and leaders
(Holy Roman Empire) János Isolano (POW)	Yemişçi Hasan Pasha; Beylerbey Lala Mehmed; Beylerbey Dervis Hassan

Strength
3,000 men	40,000–50,000 men

Casualties and losses
Majority killed 250–300 captured	Unknown

The siege of Székesfehérvár began on 12 August, 1602, when an Ottoman force under the command of the Grand Vizier, Yemişçi Hasan Pasha, besieged the Habsburg fortress of Székesfehérvár, occupied by them since 1601. The Ottomans ended up capturing the fortress.

== Background ==
After spending the winter in Belgrade with his army, Jemiscsi Haszán, the leader of the campaign that tried to retake Székesfehérvár the year before, left for the region at the end of June. Their goal was to retake Fehérvár Castle. As they arrived at the fort, Beylerbey Lala Mehmed, the Pasha of Buda, and Beylerbey Dervis Hassan, the Pasha of Bosnia, joined the army. There were roughly 40–50,000 men in total.

Since December of last year, Colonel Giovanni Marco Isolano and his vice captain, Wathay Ferenc, who rose to prominence as a poet and warrior in the Borderlands, have been defending Fehérvár Castle. About 3,000 men were enough soldiers to fly their flags, but neither their payment to soldiers nor the castle's renovations had been completed. Prior to the impending siege, the Christians attempted to supply food and gunpowder to the fort and even paid the guards.

This time, the garrison was commanded by Conte János Isolano.

== Siege ==
On 11 August, Hassan's army arrived at the fort, and the following day, the siege started. The swamps surrounding the castle dried up due to the summer heat, which made the defenders' situation more challenging. By 12 August, they had already abandoned Beslia, one of the outer forts. On 14 August, however, they repulsed the Ottoman attack on Sziget, the other outlying city, even though it took a sizable force and ferocious combat to win. The next day, the Ottomans attempted another attack but were again repulsed.

Following these setbacks, Hassan filled the moats and started bombarding the walls. On 17 August, he launched his second attack against Sziget-outer fort. After it proved successful, Isolano had to clear this area, and the Hajduk soldiers withdrew from this outer city. The next day, the Ottoman soldiers attacked the Ingovány outside of the city, forcing the defenders to flee. On 20 August, after capturing these outer cities, the Turks set up their cannons and started to bombard the inner castle.

The defenders have suffered heavy casualties from the artillery fire, but they appeared to have enough strength to charge out. Field Marshal Russwurm announced on 23 August that he would go to the aid of the castle within 3 days; however, as his strength was low, he later renounced this intention.

On 28 August, the Ottomans launched a major assault. The besiegers managed to breach the round bastion and the tower located on the southern side of the fort, despite being routed at the northern entrance. The defenders moved to hide behind the inner walls. Although the number of defenders has now dropped to 700, there were only about 300 of them who were uninjured. Despite the refusal of Isolano and his officers to surrender, the soldiers started rioting and holding negotiations with the Turks.

== Aftermath ==
After more talks on 29 August, the soldiers and mercenaries abandoned the fort's walls and guard stations. Upon noticing this, the French and Italian mercenaries working for the Ottomans scaled the walls, forced their way through the gates, and as soon as they were open, they massacred everyone in their way and captured between 250 and 300 prisoners. This time, the Christians were treated far more brutally by the French than by the Ottomans, who showed mercy to everyone who asked for it.

Hassán Pasha took Isolano prisoner and brought him, along with a few of his subcommanders, to Belgrade. In addition to the old cannons, the Ottomans also took control of the castle and its contents, which included 86 barrels of rusks, 200 barrels of flour, 500 bushels of salt, 10,000 forints in cash, 400 pounds of gunpowder, numerous bullets, lead, and other items.
