= Mojsije I =

Serbian Patriarch

- Archbishop of Peć and Serbian Patriarch
- Church: Serbian Patriarchate of Peć
- See: Patriarchate of Peć Monastery
- Installed: 1712
- Term ended: 1724
- Predecessor: Atanasije I
- Successor: Arsenije IV

Personal details
- Born: Târgoviște, Ottoman Empire
- Died: 13 (24) April 1730 Novi Pazar, Ottoman Empire
- Denomination: Eastern Orthodoxy

Mojsije I Rajović (Serbian Cyrillic: Мојсије I Рајовић; died 13 (24) April 1730 in Novi Pazar) was the Patriarch of the Serbian Patriarchate of Peć from 1712 to 1724, with seat in the Patriarchal Monastery of Peć.

Before he became the Serbian Patriarch, Mojsije served as Metropolitan of Raška, from 1704, under Patriarch Kalinik I. That was traditionally a very prominent position, so when the next Patriarch Atanasije I died in 1712, Mojsije was elected as his successor. His seat was in the Patriarchal Monastery of Peć.

During the Austro-Turkish War of 1716–18, Belgrade was liberated from Ottoman rule together with northern parts of Serbia and Temes Banat. In those regions new ecclesiastical province for Orthodox Serbs in Habsburg Monarchy was formed, known as the Metropolitanate of Belgrade. It was headed by metropolitan Mojsije Petrović, who received blessings and confirmation from Patriarch Mojsije. New autonomous Metropolitanate of Belgrade had jurisdiction over Kingdom of Serbia and Temes Banat.

By 1724, the ailing patriarch Mojsije decided, under the burden of old age and poor health, to transfer his authority to the Metropolitan of Raška, named Arsenije, who became new Serbian Patriarch. After abdication from the patriarchal throne, he spent the rest of his days at the Patriarchate of Peć Monastery and also in Novi Pazar, where he died on 13 (24) April 1730.

== See also ==
- List of heads of the Serbian Orthodox Church

Eastern Orthodox Church titles
Preceded by Atanasije I	Serbian Patriarch; 1712–1724	Succeeded by Arsenije IV

== Sources ==
- Ćirković, Sima (2004). The Serbs. Malden: Blackwell Publishing. ISBN 9781405142915.
- Fotić, Aleksandar (2008). "Serbian Orthodox Church". Encyclopedia of the Ottoman Empire. New York: Infobase Publishing. pp. 519–520. ISBN 9781438110257.
- Kašić, Dušan, ed. (1965). Serbian Orthodox Church: Its past and present. Vol. 1. Belgrade: Serbian Orthodox Church.
- Pavlovich, Paul (1989). The History of the Serbian Orthodox Church. Serbian Heritage Books. ISBN 9780969133124.
- Слијепчевић, Ђоко М. (1962). Историја Српске православне цркве (History of the Serbian Orthodox Church). Vol. књ. 1. Минхен: Искра.
- Šuletić, Nebojša (2021). "Usurpations of and Designated Successions to the Throne in the Serbian Patriarchate: The Case of Patriarch Moses Rajović (1712-24)" (PDF). Balcanica. 52: 47–67.
- Točanac-Radović, Isidora (2018). "Belgrade - Seat of the Archbishopric and Metropolitanate (1718-1739)". Belgrade 1521-1867. Belgrade: The Institute of History. pp. 155–167.
