= Sokolović family =

In the Ottoman period, in the 16th century, there was an influential Sokolović family in the Sanjak of Bosnia that had two branches, one that was Eastern Orthodox Christian and was dominant in the Serbian Orthodox Church, while the other was Muslim and was influential in the Ottoman government. The Orthodox branch included patriarchs Makarije Sokolović (s. 1557–71), Antonije Sokolović (s. 1571–75), Gerasim Sokolović (s. 1575–86) and Savatije Sokolović (s. 1587). The Muslim branch included Sokollu Mehmed Pasha (Mehmed-paša Sokolović), the Ottoman Grand Vizier (s. 1565–79), Sokolluzade Lala Mehmed Pasha Grand vizier (1602-1604), Sokollu Ferhad Pasha (Ferhad-paša Sokolović) the Beylerbey of Bosnia, and Sokollu Mustafa Pasha (Mustafa-paša Sokolović) the beylerbey of Budin.

== Coat of arms ==
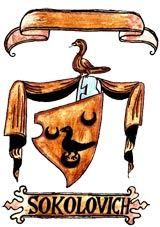
Coat of arms of the Sokolović, Fojnica Armorial (1675–88).

One of the coat of arms included in the Korenić-Neorić Armorial (1595) and the Fojnica Armorial (1675–88) claimed to be that of the "Sokolovich". The coat of arms most likely was attributed to the Sokolović of Glasinac (Sokolac region).
