= Osman Aga of Temesvar =

Ottoman soldier and writer

Osman Ağa of Temeşvar
- Born: 1670; Temeşvar, Ottoman Empire (now Timișoara, Romania)
- Died: 1725 (aged 54–55); Istanbul, Ottoman Empire
- Occupations: Army Officer, Historian, Travel Writer
- Writing career
- Genres: Autobiography, Ottoman history
- Notable works: Autobiography detailing his adventures and imprisonment in Habsburg Austria

Osman Ağa of Temeşvar (Ottoman Turkish: طمشوارلى عثمان آغا, romanized: Temeşvarlı Osman Ağa; Serbo-Croatian: Osman-aga Temišvarski; 1670–1725) was an Ottoman army officer, historian, and travel writer, as well as one of the few Turkish-language autobiographers of the era. The former prisoner-of-war wrote mostly of his adventures - and imprisonment - in Habsburg Austria. His autobiography was the sole Ottoman Turkish example of its kind.

== Life ==
Osman was born in Temeşvar (Timișoara), Temeşvar Eyalet (now in western Romania), probably in a family of Ottoman Serbian origin. He spoke German, Serbo-Croatian, Hungarian, and understood Romanian. Temesvár was inhabited by Romanians, Serbs, and Hungarians at the time and had been conquered by the Ottoman Empire in 1552.

Osman Aga was a low-ranking army officer in Temeşvar who excelled in learning foreign languages and equitation.

After the unsuccessful Siege of Vienna in 1683, the tide turned and the Holy League of European nations began to force the Ottomans out of Hungary during the Great Turkish War between 1683–1699.

=== Military service ===
The Austrians were unable to capture Temeşvar during the war. In 1688, Osman's squadron of 80 men were tasked with delivering the salaries of army officers to Lipova, Arad, just north of Temeşvar. They were attacked by superior Austrian Forces in Arad County. The city council decided to surrender, leading Osman to become a prisoner-of-war at the age of 18.

=== Prisoner-of-war ===
Osman Aga was awarded to a military judge in the Austrian Army who asked for a ransom. Despite having the means to pay for his freedom, he was not released. He was sold to several new masters in Kapfenberg and Vienna. He spent several months in dungeons and was frequently beaten and whipped by his masters during the early years, but his skill in equitation and learning German helped him to live a relatively stress free life in later years. One of his masters offered him freedom in return for converting to Christianity, which he refused. After the Treaty of Karlowitz, he returned to Temeşvar in 1700.

=== Austrian-Ottoman War and later life ===
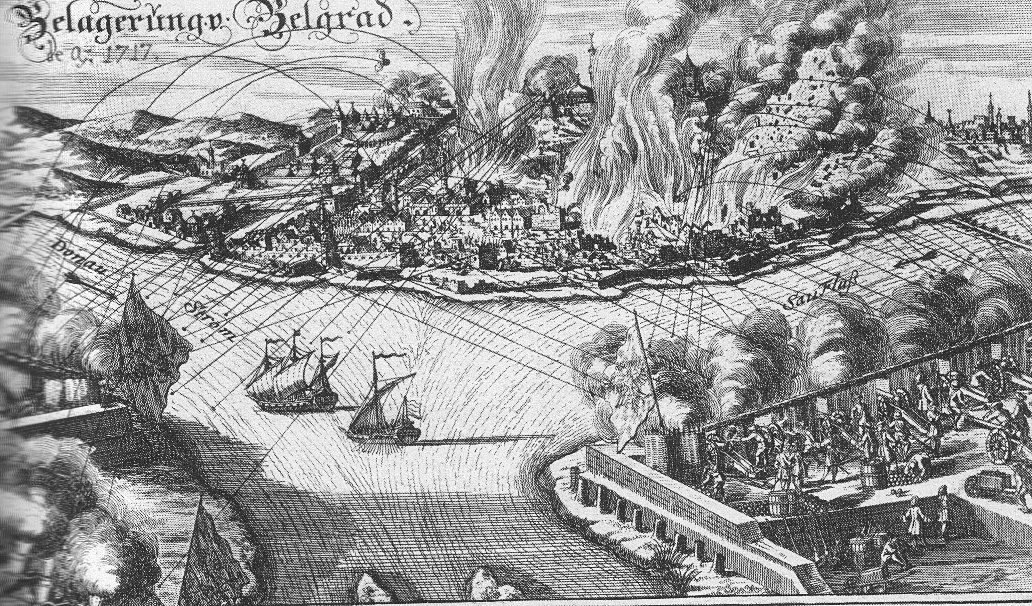
Austrian forces led by Eugene of Savoy besieged Belgrade in 1717, during the Austro-Turkish War of 1716-18.

As a result of the German he had learned during his servitude, he became the official dragoman (translator) of Temeşvar and served in several diplomatic missions to Austria. However, his newly-comfortable lifestyle was shattered at the outbreak of a new war between the Ottomans and the Austrians in 1715. This time Eugene Savoy of Austria captured Temeşvar in 1716. Osman Aga fled to Belgrade (now in Serbia). Despite Osman Aga's retreat, Belgrade shared the same fate in 1717. Shortly before the final assault of the Austrians on Belgrade, they blew up the ammunition dump of the fort on 14 August 1717. This resulted in the deaths of 3,000 people, which included most of Osman's family. After the loss of Belgrade, he served in Vidin (now in Bulgaria) and then came to Istanbul, where he continued his civil service as dragoman.

== Work ==
Osman Aga's most important work is Prisoner of the Infidels (1724), which summarizes his adventures in Austria between 1688 and 1700. He also wrote Austrian History (Turkish: Nemçe Tarihi), an unfinished work up to 1662. His other works include notes about his diplomatic missions after 1700.

- Austrian History (Turkish: Nemçe Tarihi, 1722), an unfinished work up to 1662.
- Prisoner of the Infidels (Turkish: Gâvurların Esiri, German: Der Gefangene der Giauren, 1724), his summary of his adventures in Austria between 1688 and 1700. (British Museum NR. MS Or. 3213) (Timisoara, Osman of (September 2021). English language edition. Univ of California Press. ISBN 9780520383395. published in 2021)

== See also ==
- Ottoman-Habsburg wars
- Nikolai Spathari
