= Boşnak Derviş Mehmed Pasha =

Grand Vizier of the Ottoman Empire (1606)

Boşnak · Derviş Mehmed Pasha

Grand Vizier of the Ottoman Empire
- In office 21 June 1606 – 9 December 1606
- Monarch: Ahmed I
- Preceded by: Sokolluzade Lala Mehmed Pasha
- Succeeded by: Kuyucu Murad Pasha

Kapudan Pasha
- In office 1605–1606
- Monarch: Ahmed I
- Preceded by: Cafer Pasha
- Succeeded by: Cafer Pasha

Personal details
- Born: c. 1569 Sanjak of Bosnia
- Died: 9 December 1606 (aged 36–37)
- Education: Enderun School

Derviş Mehmed Pasha (Turkish: Derviş Mehmed Paşa; c. 1569 – 9 December 1606), an Ottoman Bosnian statesman, served briefly as the Grand Vizier of the Ottoman Empire between 21 June 1606 and 9 December 1606.

== Life ==
=== Origin ===
He was born an Orthodox Christian from Bosnia, being brought away by the Ottomans as part of the devşirme, becoming a Janissary. He rose in the court ranks and became Kapıcıbaşı

He was educated in the Bostancı quarry. He was also known as Civan Bey, as he was a "boss" at a relatively young age. He won the favour of the young Ahmed I. In 1605, he was appointed as the captain of the vizier, as well. Handan Valide Sultan, the mother of Sultan Ahmed, tried to persuade her son not to believe this person, but Handan Sultan died on 9 November 1605. Ahmed I, who was 15 years old, was more influenced by the Captain-Derya Derviş Mehmed Pasha.

The Grand Vizier and the Austrian front Serdar-ı Ekrem Lala Mehmed Pasha returned to Istanbul while negotiations were being held at Zitvatorok to sign a peace agreement with Austria. Captain-Derya Sultan, who was a relative of Ahmed I, was making suggestions to send the Grand Vizier to the Iran front as serdar. Sultan Ahmed was also very determined to make Lala Mehmed Pasha the Serdar of Iran. Lala Mehmed Pasha, who came to peace, stated that the Austrian war had still not been settled and that it was not right to go to the Iran expedition for this. However, Sultan Ahmed persisted and even threatened to execute Lalas. Vizier-i Azam Lala Mehmed Pasha, who was very sorry for this, suffered a stroke and died a few days later.

=== Career ===
He was the bey of Herzegovina.

He was the Grand Vizier of the Ottoman Empire briefly between 21 June 1606 and 9 December 1606. A telhis of Derviş Mehmed to the sultan spoke of him changing the Voivode of Moldavia from Constantin Movila to Simion Movila (1606).

He was strangled by Ahmed I's order. He was buried at Üsküdar.

Derviş Mehmed Pasha was appointed as Vizier-i Azam on 21 June 1606. The Sultan was given permission to use a part of Lala Mehmed Pasha's wealth to meet the army's needs and give the other part to Lala Mehmet Pasha's orphans. However, Derviş Mehmet Pasha confiscated all of this wealth due to the shortage of treasury. British Ambassador to Istanbul Sir Henry Lello reports that Derviş Mehmet Pasha took the surplus income of the foundations on the pretext of the shortage of treasury and that he had the rich Jews collect silver and jewelry with the promise to pay the price later. It is also claimed that in Istanbul, he received a bribe of 1,000 coins for every chance from the public.

On the other hand, Dervish Mehmet Pasha, who persuaded Ahmed I to force Lala Mehmet Pasha, who did not want to be the vizier of the Iran expedition, with the intention of being the grand vizier back, refrained from going to the Iran campaign when he became the grand vizier. He had Ferhat Ağa, who was the head of the gardener, gave pashalik and sent him as a serdar over the Celalians and to the east. Ferhat Pasha Celali tortured the people of Aydın and Saruhan, where he first went to suppress the rebellion, and large groups of the people of this region filled the streets of Istanbul to make the complaint of this cruelty to the Divan-ı Humayuna. Ahmed I was very impressed by this.

Derviş Mehmet Pasha had his mansion in Demirkapı, near the Palace. Building this mansion kept a Jew safe, but did not pay the construction costs and made this Jewish trust pay all. This Jew also began to spread secretly as a rumor that "he would open a secret road from the mansion cellar to the palace and assassinate the sultan". When these fabricated rumors went to the ears of Ahmed I. Ahmed I, who was inexperienced at the age of 16, suddenly decided to execute Derviş Mehmet Pasha without any investigation. On 9 December 1606, he was invited to the palace by Ahmet I and when the princes entered the teacher house, the palace recruits were drowned and executed by the attack.

The poet Haleti wrote a satirical poem about him called Hadd-i Mestan.

Sir Henry Lello, the British ambassador to Istanbul, states in his memoirs that Derviş Mehmet Pasha is the most competent of all the grand viziers and sedaret district governors he has seen, but also states that he is cruel.

== See also ==
- List of Ottoman grand viziers

Political offices
Preceded by Sokolluzade Lala Mehmed Pasha	Grand Vizier of the Ottoman Empire; 21 June 1606 – 9 December 1606	Succeeded by Kuyucu Murad Pasha
