= Atanasije I =

Serbian Patriarch

- Archbishop of Peć and Serbian Patriarch
- Church: Serbian Patriarchate of Peć
- See: Patriarchate of Peć Monastery
- Installed: 1711
- Term ended: 1712
- Predecessor: Kalinik I
- Successor: Mojsije I

Personal details
- Denomination: Eastern Orthodoxy

Atanasije I (Serbian Cyrillic: Атанасије I) was the Patriarch of the Serbian Patriarchate of Peć from 1711 until 1712.

Before he became Serbian Patriarch, Atanasije served as Metropolitan of Skopje, from 1706, under Kalinik I. That was a very prominent position, so when old patriarch died in 1710, Atanasije was elected as his successor in 1711. His seat was in the Patriarchate of Peć Monastery.

As new Serbian Patriarch, he strengthened ties with newly created Metropolitanate of Krušedol, an autonomous ecclesiastical province of Serbian Patriarchate of Peć in Habsburg monarchy. His rule was not long since he died on 23 April 1712.

== See also ==
- List of heads of the Serbian Orthodox Church

Eastern Orthodox Church titles
Preceded by Kalinik I	Serbian Patriarch; 1711–1712	Succeeded by Mojsije I

== Sources ==
- Ćirković, Sima (2004). The Serbs. Malden: Blackwell Publishing. ISBN 9781405142915.
- Fotić, Aleksandar (2008). "Serbian Orthodox Church". Encyclopedia of the Ottoman Empire. New York: Infobase Publishing. pp. 519–520. ISBN 9781438110257.
- Kašić, Dušan, ed. (1965). Serbian Orthodox Church: Its past and present. Vol. 1. Belgrade: Serbian Orthodox Church.
- Pavlovich, Paul (1989). The History of the Serbian Orthodox Church. Serbian Heritage Books. ISBN 9780969133124.
- Слијепчевић, Ђоко М. (1962). Историја Српске православне цркве (History of the Serbian Orthodox Church). Vol. књ. 1. Минхен: Искра.
- Вуковић, Сава (1996). Српски јерарси од деветог до двадесетог века (Serbian Hierarchs from the 9th to the 20th Century). Београд: Евро.
