= Yemişçi Hasan Pasha =

Grand Vizier of the Ottoman Empire from 1601 to 1603

Damat Yemişçi Hasan Pasha

Grand Vizier of the Ottoman Empire
- In office 22 July 1601 – 4 October 1603
- Monarch: Mehmed III
- Preceded by: Damat Ibrahim Pasha
- Succeeded by: Yavuz Ali Pasha

Personal details
- Born: 1535 Rogovë, Ottoman Empire
- Died: 18 October 1603 (aged 68) Istanbul, Ottoman Empire
- Spouse: Ayşe Sultan (m. 1602)
- Ethnicity: Albanian

Damat Yemişçi Hasan Pasha (Albanian: Jemishxhi; 1535 – 18 October 1603) was an Albanian Ottoman statesman.

Hasan, an Albanian who spent his childhood in Rogovo, then went to Prizren, where he finished his primary education. He pursued the remainder of his education at the military academy in Istanbul. After a military career, Hasan became grand vizier of the Ottoman Empire from 1602 to 1603. He was executed by Sultan Mehmed III in 1603.

He married Ayşe Sultan (1565 – 15 May 1605), a daughter of Murad III, on 5 April 1602. Previously, from 1586 to 1601, she had been married to Damat Ibrahim Pasha.

== See also ==
- List of Ottoman grand viziers
- Turks in Kosovo

Political offices
Preceded by Damat Ibrahim Pasha	Grand Vizier of the Ottoman Empire; 22 July 1601 – 4 October 1603	Succeeded by Yavuz Ali Pasha
