= Sokolluzade Lala Mehmed Pasha =

Grand Vizier of the Ottoman Empire from 1604 to 1606

Grand Vizier of the Ottoman Empire
- In office 5 August 1604 – 21 June 1606
- Monarch: Ahmed I
- Preceded by: Yavuz Ali Pasha
- Succeeded by: Boşnak Derviş Mehmed Pasha

Personal details
- Died: 21 June 1606
- Spouse: Hatice Sultan (m. 1598)
- Relations: Sokollu Mehmed Pasha (cousin?)
- Children: Two sons A daughter
- Education: Enderun School
- Origins: Serb

Sokolluzade Lala Mehmed Pasha (died 21 June 1606) was an Ottoman Bosnian statesman. He may have been a cousin of the Ottoman grand vizier Sokollu Mehmed Pasha and served as tutor (lala) to a royal prince. He was the grand vizier between 1604 and 1606.

== See also ==
- List of Ottoman grand viziers

Political offices
| Preceded by Yavuz Ali Pasha | Grand Vizier of the Ottoman Empire; 5 August 1604 – 21 June 1606 | Succeeded by Dervish Mehmed Pasha |
