= Yavuz Ali Pasha =

Grand Vizier of the Ottoman Empire from 1603 to 1604

Yavuz Ali Pasha or Malkoç Ali Pasha (died 26 July 1604, Belgrade) was an Ottoman statesman. He belonged to the Malkoçoğlu family and served as the Grand Vizier of the Ottoman Empire from 16 October 1603 to 26 July 1604 replacing Yemişçi Hasan Pasha. He had previously served as the Ottoman governor of Egypt from 1601 to 1603. His installation as Grand Vizier took place on 29 December 1603, over two months after his appointment and a week after the accession of Ahmed I, due to the time it took him to settle affairs in Egypt and travel to Constantinople. He brought with him two years' worth of the province's back taxes.

In the summer of 1604 he left the capital to take up command of Ottoman forces in the on-going war against the Habsburgs. He fell sick on the journey and died in Belgrade on 26 July 1604. He was succeeded by Sokolluzade Lala Mehmed Pasha as the next Grand vizier of the Ottoman empire.

== See also ==
- List of Ottoman grand viziers
- List of Ottoman governors of Egypt

Political offices
Preceded by Hızır Pasha	Ottoman Governor of Egypt; 1601–1603	Succeeded by Maktul Hacı Ibrahim Pasha
Preceded by Yemişçi Hasan Pasha	Grand Vizier of the Ottoman Empire; 16 October 1603 – 26 July 1604	Succeeded by Sokolluzade Lala Mehmed Pasha
