= Kalinik I =

Serbian Patriarch

- Archbishop of Peć and Serbian Patriarch
- Church: Serbian Patriarchate of Peć
- See: Patriarchate of Peć Monastery
- Installed: 1691
- Term ended: 1710
- Predecessor: Arsenije III
- Successor: Atanasije I

Personal details
- Born: Skopje
- Died: 1710 Timișoara
- Denomination: Eastern Orthodoxy

Kalinik I (Serbian Cyrillic: Калиник I; died 1710) was the patriarch of the Serbian Patriarchate of Peć from 1691 until 1710.

He was a relative of Alexander Mavrocordatos, a very influential man and translator at the Porte. The Dečani memorials calls him "Kalinik of Skoplje" (Kalinik ot Skoplje), while there is scarce information on his early life. He became the spiritual leader of the Serbian Church in difficult circumstances, following the exodus of Serbs to the Habsburg monarchy, in the First Great Migration of the Serbs following the failure of Habsburg operations in Serbia, under the leadership of his predecessor Arsenije III Crnojević (1674–90). In order to thwart Arsenije III's influence on the Serbs, the Ottomans appointed Kalinik, previously a priest in Skoplje, as the new Patriarch of Peć. Kalinik tried to calm down the people and to return the bishops and clergy that had fled their offices. The Ottomans, in order to increase his reputation and income (which benefited them), and spark discontent towards Austria and Venice, again ordered that Catholics within the Patriarchate's jurisdiction had to pay certain levies to its bishoprics. The fleeing Serbs were given privileges in the Habsburg Monarchy; Arsenije III remained spiritual leader of Eastern Orthodox Serbs and their reorganized national church in the Habsburg Monarchy. Many of the bishops and Ottoman Serbs did not recognize Kalinik as their patriarch, however, this changed after the death of Arsenije III (1706). Older Serbian sources hold Kalinik in a bad light. He managed to maintain the existence and independence of the Serbian Patriarchate of Peć within the Ottoman Empire, despite the difficult position of the Serbs who had not fled north. Meanwhile, the Habsburg Serbs were met with pressure from the Catholic Church. With the death of Arsenije III, the successor to the metropolitanate was to be chosen, and it was maintained that the patriarchal title was only for the Patriarchate of Peć. In 1707, a Habsburg Serb assembly was held at Sremski Karlovci, where it was strongly decided that the communion with the Patriarchate of Peć was not to be broken and that the supreme power was recognized in the Patriarch of Peć, Kalinik. The new metropolitanate seat was chosen to be Krušedol, which was opposed by the Habsburgs "due to risk that Serbs return under the Turks, and for easier Uniatization". The Serbs did not back down, so the Habsburgs eventually accepted the decision. Kalinik recognized the new autonomous Metropolitanate of Krušedol, thereby maintaining the unity of the Serbian Orthodox Church.

== See also ==
- List of heads of the Serbian Orthodox Church

Eastern Orthodox Church titles
Preceded by Arsenije III	Serbian Patriarch; 1691–1710	Succeeded by Atanasije I

== Sources ==
- Andrić, Ljubisav (1991). Seoba u sporovima. Književna zajednica Novog Sada.
- Ćirković, Sima (2004). The Serbs. Malden: Blackwell Publishing.
- Ćorović, Vladimir (2001) [1997]. "Istorija srpskog naroda" (Internet ed.). Belgrade: Јанус; Ars Libri.
- Fotić, Aleksandar (2008). "Serbian Orthodox Church". Encyclopedia of the Ottoman Empire. New York: Infobase Publishing. pp. 519–520.
- Kašić, Dušan, ed. (1965). Serbian Orthodox Church: Its past and present. Vol. 1. Belgrade: Serbian Orthodox Church.
- Pavlovich, Paul (1989). The History of the Serbian Orthodox Church. Serbian Heritage Books.
- Слијепчевић, Ђоко М. (1962). Историја Српске православне цркве (History of the Serbian Orthodox Church). Vol. књ. 1. Минхен: Искра.
- Вуковић, Сава (1996). Српски јерарси од деветог до двадесетог века (Serbian Hierarchs from the 9th to the 20th Century). Београд: Евро.
- Тричковић, Радмила (1994). "Српски патријарх Калиник I: Друга обнова Пећке патријаршије (Serbian Patriarch Kalinik I: The Second Revival of the Peć Patriarchate)". Историјски часопис (39: 1992): 87–118.
- Шулетић, Небојша С. (2011). "Берат патријарха Калиника I (Charter of Patriarch Kalinik I)" (PDF). Зборник Матице српске за историју. 83: 97–104.
