= Sokolović =

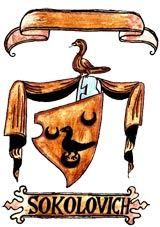
Coat of arms of the Sokolović, Fojnica Armorial (1675–1688).

Sokolović (Serbian Cyrillic: Соколовић, may also be transliterated as Sokolovic or Sokolovich) is a South Slavic surname. It derives from the Slavic word sokol, meaning "falcon" and literally means "son of the falcon". The Sokolović of the Sanjak of Herzegovina were called Sokoli and Sokullu-oğlu, by the Ottomans. One of the coat of arms included in the Korenić-Neorić Armorial (1595) and the Fojnica Armorial (1675–88) claimed to be that of the "Sokolovich". The coat of arms most likely was attributed to the Sokolović of Glasinac (Sokolac region).

== Modern families ==
=== Bosnia and Herzegovina ===
The Sokolović in Foča have the slava of Mratindan, the veneration of Serbian King Stefan Dečanski. The Sokolović of Foča, when interviewed by Vladimir Dedijer, said that they had left their ancestral home long ago. Dedijer concluded that the Sokolović of Foča hailed from Korjenići. Indeed, in the Late Middle Ages, families in Korjenići had the slava of Mratindan; among these families were surely the Sokolović of Foča. The Mastilović in Gacko claimed that they were formerly named Sokolović, and that they were kin with those Sokolović in Foča, with whom they share the slava, and they claimed that Mehmed-paša Sokolović was one of their ancestors. A Sima Mastilović was mentioned in a document of the Piva Monastery from 1569; this points to that Sokolović was used much earlier than that. The Kojović and Djaić in Čičevo near Trebinje also descend from the Sokolović in Foča, and have the slava of Mratindan.

Petar Rađenović's anthropological work Bjelajsko Polje i Bravsko (1925) mentioned a Sokolović family in the Muslim village of Bjelaj, Bosanski Petrovac, as one of three Serb families, which had in 1921 settled from Ripač; they have the slava of Đurđevdan, and hail from Čajniče, and were earlier surnamed Glođajić.

=== Serbia ===
In the period of 1920–31, Serb and other South Slavic families of the Kingdom of Hungary (and Serbian-Hungarian Baranya-Baja Republic) were given the option to leave Hungary for the Kingdom of Yugoslavia, and thereby change citizenship (these were called optanti). The Sokolović optanti were Serb. In Nagybudmér (Veliki Budmir), there was one optanti Sokolović family, in Borjád (Borjad), there were three opranti Sokolović families.

=== Croatia ===
There are Sokolović in Dubrovnik area, originating from Popovo Polje in Herzegovina. They originate from Catholics who migrated from Popovo to Dubrovnik in the 18th century. Their surname is sometimes spelled as Soko or Sokol. They were first recorded as Soko in Dračevo near Popovo Polje in the 16th century, and later as Sokolović in Velja Međa and Kiševo in the 18th century. They started as a branch of an unknown older family.

There are also Serbian Orthodox Sokolović in Kordun, Croatia, who have the slava of Đurđevdan.

== Notable individuals ==
- Mehmed-paša Sokolović or Sokollu Mehmed Pasha (1506–1579), Ottoman statesman
- Makarije Sokolović (died 1574), Serbian Patriarch from 1557 to 1571
- Antonije Sokolović (died 1574), Serbian Patriarch from 1571 to 1575
- Gerasim Sokolović (died c. 1586). Serbian Patriarch from 1575 to 1586
- Savatije Sokolović (died 1586), Serbian Metropolitan of Herzegovina and later Serbian Patriarch, 1587
- Jerotej Sokolović (died 1591), Serbian patriarch from 1589 to 1591
- Filip Sokolović, Serbian patriarch from 1591 to 1592
- Ferhat-paša Sokolović (died 1586) - Ottoman statesman
- Lala Mehmed-paša Sokolović (died 1606), Ottoman statesman from Serbian origin, grand vizier between 1604 and 1606
- Lazar Sokolović (fl. 1718–35), an emissary of the Serbian Orthodox assemblies between 1718 and 1735.
- Sokolović, captain of the Serbian Free Corps.
- Dominik Sokolović (died 1837) - Catholic priest
- Gligor Sokolović (1870–1910) - Chetnik military commander
- Mićo Sokolović (1883–1906), founder of the labour movement in Bosnia and Herzegovina
- Semka Sokolović-Bertok (1935–2008) - Bosnian actress
- Zijah Sokolović (born 1950) - Bosnian actor and director
- Zoran Sokolović (1938–2001) - former Minister of Internal Affairs (Serbia) and Minister of the Interior (Yugoslavia)
- Milorad Sokolović (1922–1999) former player for the Yugoslavia national basketball team
- Ana Sokolovic (born 1968), Canadian music composer
- Sarah Sokolovic (born 1980), American actress
- Dino Sokolović (born 1988), Croatian alpine skier
- Faruk Sokolović (born 1952), Bosnian film director, television producer, actor and screenwriter
- Ognjen Sokolović (born 1963), Bosnian bobsledder
- Jasmin Sokolović (born 1962), Bosnian musician and trumpeter

== Ottoman-era Sokolović family ==
In the Ottoman period, in the 16th century, there was an influential Sokolović family that had two branches, one that was Orthodox (Serb), and was dominant in the Serbian Orthodox Church, while the other became Muslim, and was influential in the Ottoman government. The Orthodox branch included Serbian patriarchs Makarije Sokolović (s. 1557–71), Antonije Sokolović (s. 1571–75), Gerasim Sokolović (s. 1575–86) and Savatije Sokolović (s. 1587). The Muslim branch included Sokollu Mehmed Pasha (Mehmed-paša Sokolović), the Ottoman Grand Vizier (s. 1565–79) and Sokollu Ferhad Pasha (Ferhad-paša Sokolović), the Beylerbey of Bosnia.

== See also ==
- Sokolovići (disambiguation)
- Sokolov (surname)
- Sokol (surname)

== Sources ==
- Etnografski Muzej (1964). Glasnik. Vol. 4. Cetinje: Etnografski Muzej. pp. 163–165.
- Sivrić, Marijan (2003). Migracije iz Hercegovine na dubrovačko područje od potresa 1667. do pada republike 1808. godine [Migrations from Herzegovina on the Dubrovnik area from the earthquake of 1667 to the fall of the republic in 1808] (in Croatian). Dubrovnik-Mostar: Biskupski ordinarijat Mostar-Državni arhiv Dubrovnik. ISBN 9539864267.
