= Sokollu =

Bosnian family of Serbian ethnic origin

The Sokollu family (Serbo-Croatian and Bosnian: Sokolović) was a prominent Bosnian family of Serbian ethnic origin. Its members served as high state officials in the Ottoman Empire during the 16th century. Prominent members include Sokollu Mehmed Pasha, Ferhad Pasha Sokolović, Makarije Sokolović, and Savatije Sokolović.

== See also ==
- Sokolović
