= Anthony I =

Anthony I or Antony I may refer to:

- Anthony I of Constantinople, Archbishop of Constantinople and Ecumenical Patriarch from 821 to 837
- Anthony I, Count of Ligny (1450–1519)
- Anthony I, Lord of Monaco (died 1358)
- Antonio I, Prince of Monaco (1661–1731)
- Anthony I, Serbian Patriarch, Archbishop of Peć and Serbian Patriarch from 1571 to 1574
- Anthony I of Portugal (1531–1595), King of Portugal in 1580
- Anthony I, Eritrean Patriarch (1929–2022), Archbishop of Asmara and Eritrean Patriarch from 2004 to 2007
- Anthony I, Count of Oldenburg (1505–1573)

== See also ==
- Patriarch Anthony (disambiguation)
