= Gerasim I =

Serbian Patriarch

- Archbishop of Peć and Serbian Patriarch
- Church: Serbian Patriarchate of Peć
- See: Patriarchal Monastery of Peć
- Installed: 1574
- Term ended: 1586
- Predecessor: Antonije I
- Successor: Savatije I

Orders
- Rank: Patriarch

Personal details
- Died: c. 1586
- Denomination: Eastern Orthodox Christianity

Gerasim I Sokolović (Serbian Cyrillic: Герасим I Соколовић) was Patriarch of the Serbian Patriarchate of Peć from 1574 to 1586. He was the third primate of the restored Serbian Patriarchate of Peć, and cousin of previous Serbian Patriarch Antonije I.

Gerasim belonged to the prominent Serbian Sokolović family. He was nephew of Serbian Petriarch Makarije Sokolović (1557–1571). During the patriarchal tenure of his cousin Antonije I (1571–1574), Gerasim became Metropolitan of Herzegovina. When Patriarch Antonije died in 1574, Metropolitan Gerasim was elected new Serbian Patriarch, with residence in the Patriarchal Monastery of Peć. In that time, his other cousin Mehmed Sokolović, from the Islamized branch of the family, held the post of the Grand Vizier of the Ottoman Empire (1565–1579) and acted as protector of the Serbian Patriarchate. As patriarch, Gerasim appointed his cousin Savatije Sokolović to be the next Metropolitan of Herzegovina. In time, some disputes arose between two cousins, resulting in rivalry for the patriarchal throne. Eventually, Metropolitan Savatije managed to succeed Patriarch Gerasim, probably in 1585 or 1586.

== See also ==
- List of heads of the Serbian Orthodox Church

Eastern Orthodox Church titles
Preceded by Antonije I	Serbian Patriarch; 1574–1586	Succeeded by Savatije I
Preceded by Antonije Sokolović	Metropolitan of Herzegovina c. 1572-1574	Succeeded by Savatije Sokolović

== Sources ==
- Ćirković, Sima (2004). The Serbs. Malden: Blackwell Publishing.
- Fotić, Aleksandar (2008). "Serbian Orthodox Church". Encyclopedia of the Ottoman Empire. New York: Infobase Publishing. pp. 519–520.
- Kašić, Dušan, ed. (1965). Serbian Orthodox Church: Its past and present. Vol. 1. Belgrade: Serbian Orthodox Church.
- Pavlovich, Paul (1989). The History of the Serbian Orthodox Church. Serbian Heritage Books.
- Слијепчевић, Ђоко М. (1962). Историја Српске православне цркве (History of the Serbian Orthodox Church). Vol. књ. 1. Минхен: Искра.
- Sotirović, Vladislav B. (2011). "The Serbian Patriarchate of Peć in the Ottoman Empire: The First Phase (1557–94)". Serbian Studies: Journal of the North American Society for Serbian Studies. 25 (2): 143–169.
- Вуковић, Сава (1996). Српски јерарси од деветог до двадесетог века (Serbian Hierarchs from the 9th to the 20th Century). Београд: Евро.
