= Sokollu Mehmed Pasha Mosque =

Sokollu Mehmed Pasha Mosque is the name of some 16th-century Ottoman mosques built for grand vizier Sokollu Mehmed Pasha, and may refer to:

- Sokollu Mehmed Pasha Mosque, Azapkapı, (built 1578) in Beyoğlu district of Istanbul, Turkey
- Sokollu Mehmed Pasha Mosque, Büyükçekmece, (built 1567) in Büyükçekmece district of Istanbul Province, Turkey
- Sokollu Mehmed Pasha Mosque, Kadırga, (built 1571) in Fatih district of Istanbul, Turkey
- Sokollu Mehmed Pasha Mosque, Lüleburgaz, (built 1569) in Lüleburgaz district of Kırklareli Province, Turkey
