= Savatije Sokolović =

Serbian Patriarch

Savatije
- Archbishop of Peć and Serbian Patriarch
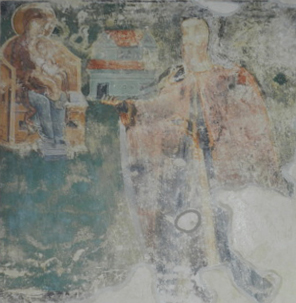
- Fresco depicting Savatije with the model of his endowment, the Piva Monastery.
- Church: Serbian Patriarchate of Peć
- See: Patriarchate of Peć Monastery
- Installed: 1585
- Term ended: 1586
- Predecessor: Gerasim I
- Successor: Nikanor I
- Other post: Metropolitan of Herzegovina (1573–1585)

Personal details
- Born: Savatije Sokolović Prijepolje, Ottoman Empire (present-day Serbia)
- Died: 1586
- Denomination: Eastern Orthodoxy

Savatije Sokolović (Serbian Cyrillic: Саватије Соколовић; fl. 1573 – 1586), was the Patriarch of the Serbian Patriarchate of Peć from 1585 to 1586. Before that, he served as Metropolitan of Herzegovina from 1573 to 1585. He was a member of the notable Sokolović family, being a nephew of Serbian Patriarch Makarije Sokolović (1557–71). Savatije founded the Piva Monastery in 1573.

== Life ==
Sokolović was born in Prijepolje, at the time part of the Sanjak of Herzegovina of the Ottoman Empire (now in Serbia). He was a son of Vukašin, the "knyaz of Rudići", and was part of the notable Sokolović family, being a fraternal nephew of Patriarch Makarije (s. 1557–71), and relative to many other archbishops, and even Ottoman statesmen.

He succeeded his relative Antonije as the Metropolitan of Herzegovina in 1573, who then became the Serbian Patriarch; the Sokolović bishops were obviously succeeding each other as metropolitan of Herzegovina, then as coadjutor to the Serbian Patriarch, and finally as Serbian Patriarch. That same year, Savatije founded (as ktitor) the Piva Monastery, dedicated to the Dormition of the Most Holy Mother of God, located by the Piva river in the historical Piva region (the former župa of Piva, in modern-day western Montenegro). The construction workers were brothers named Gavrilo and Vukašin. Russian historian Aleksandr Fedorovich Gilferding (1831–1872) said that the monastery was the greatest and most beautiful building in all of Herzegovina.

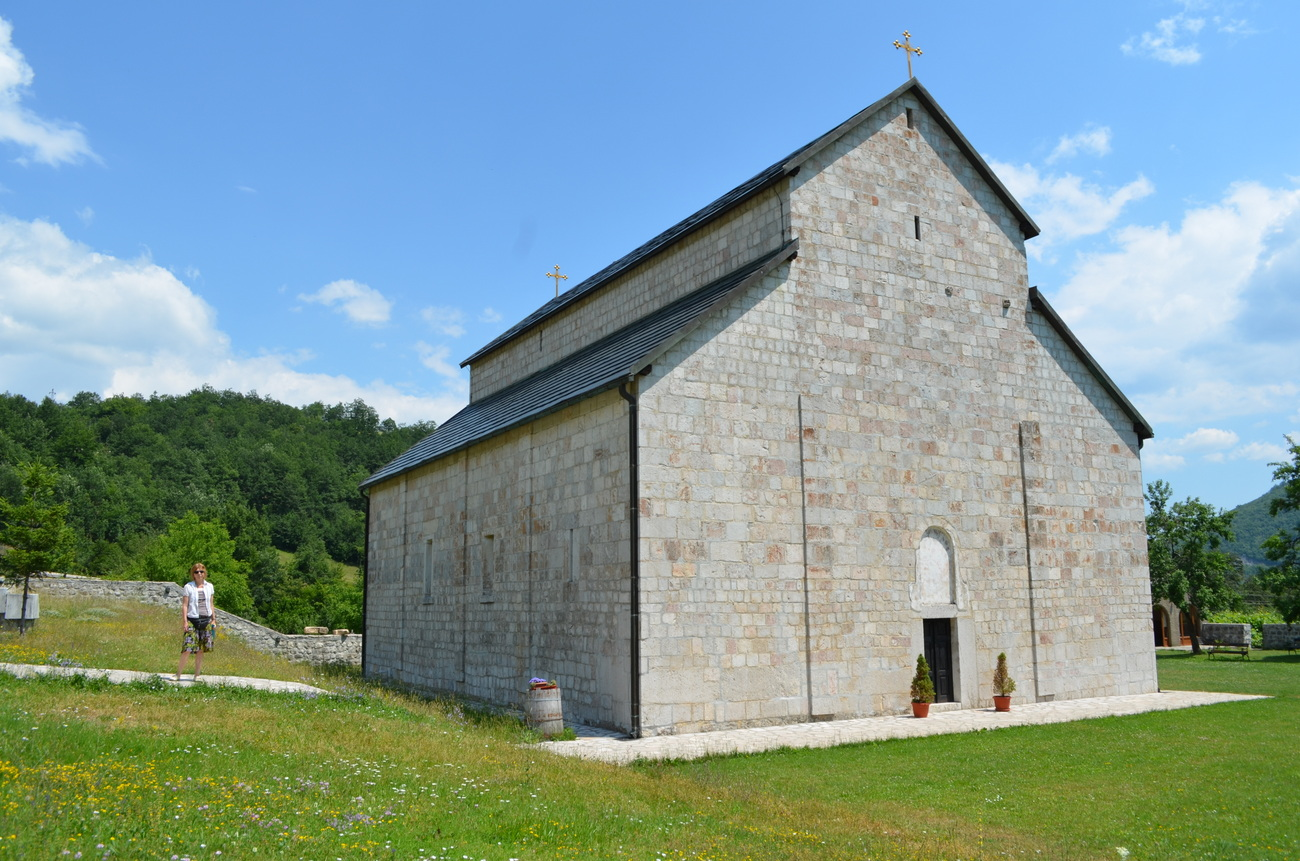
Piva Monastery

He remained the Metropolitan of Herzegovina until his enthronement as the Archbishop of Peć and Serbian Patriarch in 1585, and served until his presumed death in 1586 when the last mention is made of him, regarding the finished construction of Piva. He died before Gerasim. Historian S. Novaković (1842–1915) concluded that his death place was in the Ubožac Monastery, although this has since been refuted.

Savatije proved himself more energetic than his predecessors, and boldly and persistently, with the help of Grand Vizier Sokollu Mehmed Pasha (Mehmed-paša Sokolović) and other Islamized Sokolović family members, and other Viziers of Serbian origin, to work for the strengthening of Church autonomy. Unfortunately, chronicles have no further information on his life, as is the case with many other Serbian patriarchs. Both Savatije and Sokollu Mehmed Pasha are depicted on the interior frescoes.

== See also ==
- List of heads of the Serbian Orthodox Church

Eastern Orthodox Church titles
Preceded by Gerasim I	Serbian Patriarch; 1585–1586	Succeeded by Nikanor I
Preceded by Antonije I	Metropolitan of Herzegovina; 1573–1585	Succeeded by Visarion

== Sources ==
- Ćirković, Sima (2004). The Serbs. Malden: Blackwell Publishing. ISBN 9781405142915.
- Fotić, Aleksandar (2008). "Serbian Orthodox Church". Encyclopedia of the Ottoman Empire. New York: Infobase Publishing. pp. 519–520. ISBN 9781438110257.
- Kašić, Dušan, ed. (1965). Serbian Orthodox Church: Its past and present. Vol. 1. Belgrade: Serbian Orthodox Church.
- Pavlovich, Paul (1989). The History of the Serbian Orthodox Church. Serbian Heritage Books. ISBN 9780969133124.
- Слијепчевић, Ђоко М. (1962). Историја Српске православне цркве (History of the Serbian Orthodox Church). Vol. књ. 1. Минхен: Искра.
- Sotirović, Vladislav B. (2011). "The Serbian Patriarchate of Peć in the Ottoman Empire: The First Phase (1557–94)". Serbian Studies: Journal of the North American Society for Serbian Studies. 25 (2): 143–169. doi:10.1353/ser.2011.0038. S2CID 143629322.
- Вуковић, Сава (1996). Српски јерарси од деветог до двадесетог века (Serbian Hierarchs from the 9th to the 20th Century). Београд: Евро.
