= Budisavci Monastery =

Serbian Orthodox monastery near Klina, Kosovo

Coordinates: 42°39′54″N 20°29′20″E

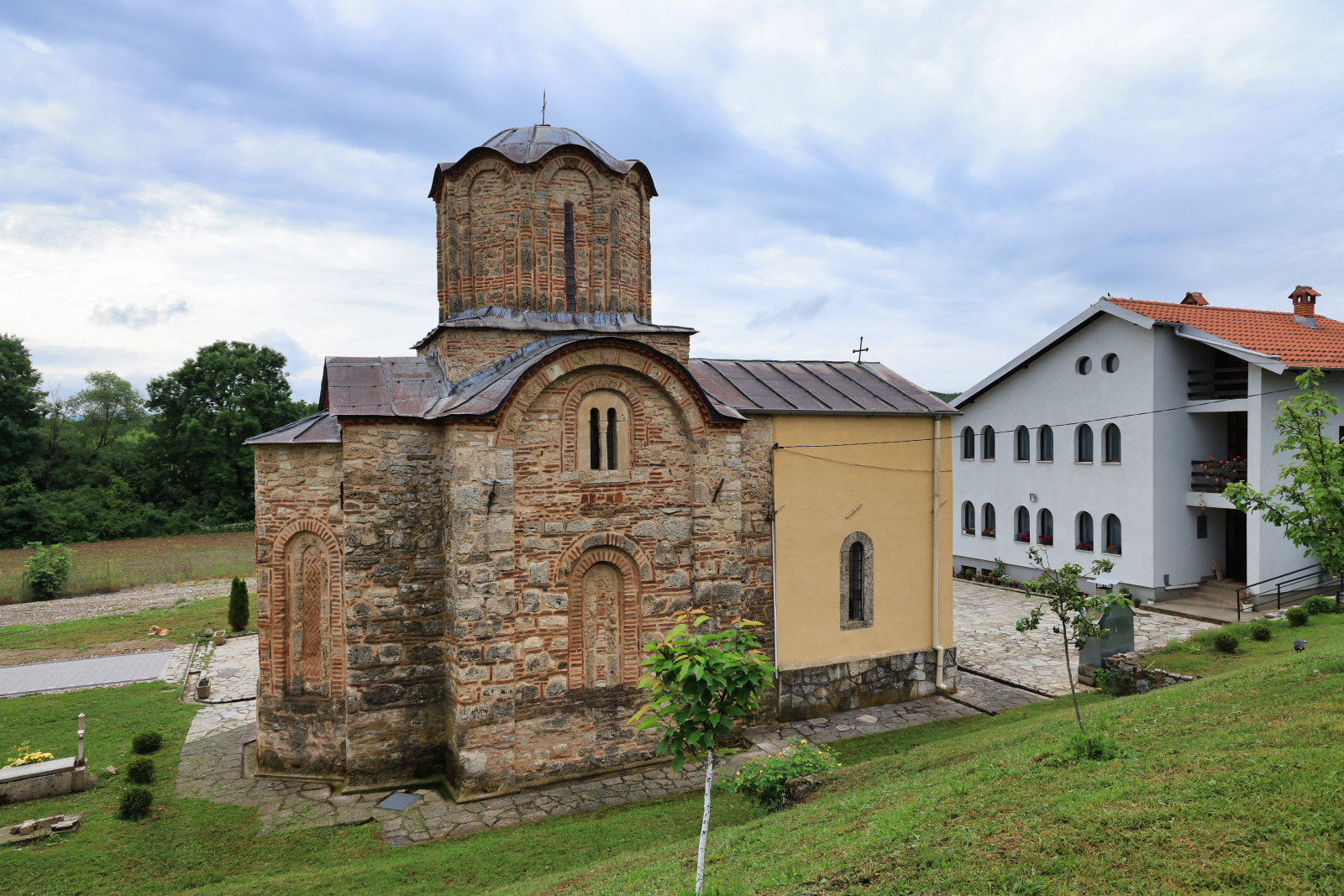
- Overview of the Budisavci Monastery church
- Interactive map of Budisavci Monastery

Monastery information
- Full name: Monastery of the Transfiguration of Jesus Christ at Budisavci
- Denomination: Serbian Orthodox Church
- Established: early 14th century
- Mother house: Patriarchate of Peć
- Dedication: Transfiguration of Jesus Christ
- Celebration: Transfiguration (Preobraženje), 19 August
- Diocese: Eparchy of Raška and Prizren
- Controlled churches: 1

People
- Founder: Unknown (traditionally attributed to King Stefan Uroš II Milutin)
- Important associated figures: Patriarch Makarije Sokolović (restoration, 1568)

Architecture
- Status: Monastery
- Functional status: Active
- Heritage designation: Cultural heritage monument
- Style: Byzantine Cross-in-square
- Completed date: 14th century (original); 1568 (restoration)

Site
- Location: Budisavci village, near Klina and Peć
- Country: Kosovo
- Public access: Yes
- Other information: Metochion of the Patriarchate of Peć

Budisavci Monastery (Albanian: Manastiri i Budisavcit; Serbian: Манастир Будисавци, romanized: Manastir Budisavci) is a medieval Serbian Orthodox monastery in the village of Budisavci near Klina and Peja. The monastery church is dedicated to the Transfiguration of Jesus Christ and represents an important religious and cultural monument of medieval Serbian heritage in the region.

== History ==
=== Foundation and early history ===
The monastery was built in the early 14th century. The founder is unknown, though some scholars attribute it to Stefan Uroš II Milutin, while local tradition connects it to his daughter, the sister of Stefan Dečanski.

Budisavci Monastery historically functioned as a metochion (dependency) of the Patriarchate of Peć.

=== Ottoman period and restoration ===
The original 14th-century frescoes did not survive. In 1568, the church was restored and repainted under Makarije Sokolović, following the reestablishment of the Serbian Patriarchate of Peć. His portrait is preserved among the frescoes in the nave.

During the 19th century, a narthex was added to the western site of the church, partially covering earlier frescoes.

=== Modern period ===
Budisavci Monastery remains active. The feast of the Transfiguration (Preobraženje), celebrated annually in August, draws hundreds of Orthodox believers.

In recent years, the monastery has benefited from restoration efforts, including roof repairs funded by JKSP "Zvečan" in 2025.The monastery is also associated with the disappearance of Hieromonk Stefan Purić during the post-Kosovo War period, a case still commemorated annually.

== Architecture and art ==
The monastery church is constructed in the Byzantine cross-in-square style, with an octagonal dome and a three-sided apse on the eastern side. The walls feature alternating layers of stone and brick, typical of medieval Serbian ecclesiastical architecture.

The preserved frescoes, mostly from the 16th century, depict Saint Sava, Stefan Nemanja, Serbian archbishops, Makarije Sokolović, and scenes from the Great Feasts and Passion of Christ cycles.

== See also ==
- List of Serbian Orthodox monasteries
