= Sokullu =

Sokullu is a Turkish surname. Notable people with the surname include:

- Sokullu Mehmed Paşa, (1506 – October 11, 1579) an Ottoman grand vizier of the 16th century
- Sokullu Ferhad Paşa, (died 1586) was an Ottoman general and statesman from Bosnia, who was the first beylerbey of Bosnia
- Sokulluzade Hasan Paşa, (died 1602) was an Ottoman officer and the son of Sokollu Mehmet Pasha
- Sokulluzade Lala Mehmed Paşa, (died June 21, 1606) a Bosnian Ottoman statesman, who may have been a cousin of Sokollu Mehmed Pasha
- Birkan Sokullu (1985), Turkish actor
- Ömer Can Sokullu, (1988) a Turkish football midfielder
