= Sokollu Mehmed Pasha Mosque, Büyükçekmece =

16th century Turkish mosque

Sokollu Mehmed Pasha Mosque
- Sokollu Mehmet Paşa Camii
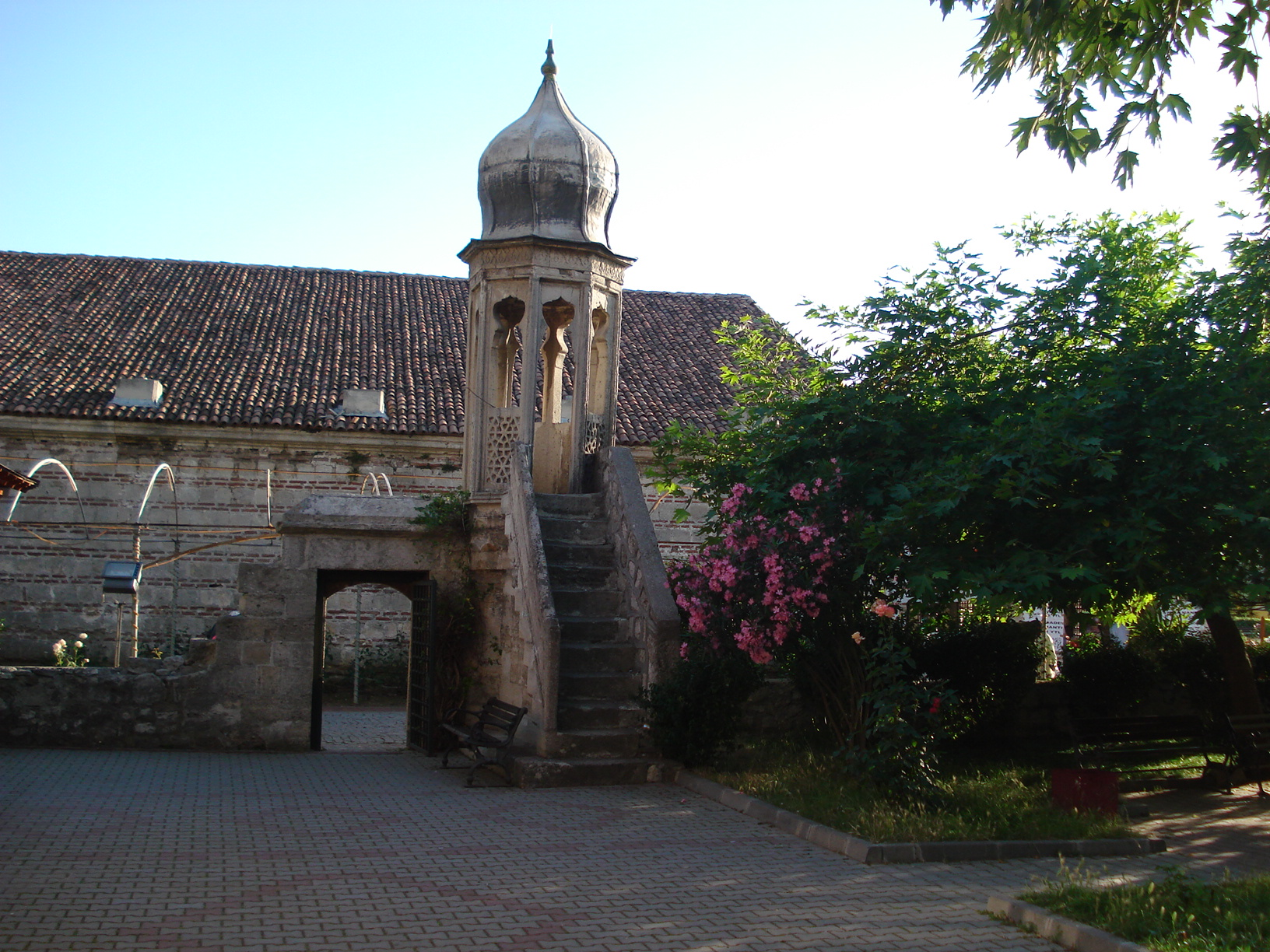

- Location of the mosque in Istanbul, turkey

Religion
- Affiliation: Islam
- District: Büyükçekmece
- Province: Istanbul

Location
- Location: Istanbul, Turkey
- Coordinates: 41°01′20″N 28°34′34″E

Architecture
- Architect: Mimar Sinan
- Type: mosque
- Completed: 1567; 459 years ago
- Minaret: 1

The Sokollu Mehmed Pasha Mosque (Turkish: Sokollu Mehmet Paşa Camii), also known as the Köprübaşı (Bridgehead) Mosque, is the ruin of a 16th-century Ottoman mosque located in Istanbul, Turkey.

The ruin is situated in Büyükçekmece which is now a district of Istanbul, but would have been in the countryside at the time the mosque was built. It was designed by Ottoman imperial architect Mimar Sinan (c. 1488/1490-1588) and built for the grand vizier Sokollu Mehmed Pasha (in office 1565–1579) in 1567. It is one of the three mosques with the same name built by Mimar Sinan in Istanbul.

Only the minaret, one gateway and a low wall remain of the mosque. The minaret is unusual in that it is 'monolithic', carved from a single piece of stone. The design is unique in Turkey, there being one similar minaret in Egypt.

The mosque was constructed beside the east end of the Kanuni Sultan Suleiman Bridge.
