= Nikanor I =

Serbian Patriarch

Nikanor I, also referred to as Nikanor, was the Patriarch of the Serbian Patriarchate of Peć in 1588.

== Career ==
Nikanor became the 17th Archbishop of Peć and Serbian Patriarch when he succeeded Savatije Sokolović in 1588. Church records state that he was enthroned in 1588 but lack information about his term. Jerotej Sokolović succeeded him the following year.

He was from Novo Brdo and had been instrumental in establishing the first printing press in Serbia.

While at the Gračanica Monastery, he was credited for producing manuscripts in the Serbian version of the Old Church Slavonic. As a Metropolitan, he was a donor of cathedra icons.

== See also ==
- List of heads of the Serbian Orthodox Church
