= Patriarch Anthony =

Patriarch Anthony or Patriarch Antony may refer to:

- Anthony I of Constantinople, Ecumenical Patriarch in 821–837
- Anthony II of Constantinople, Ecumenical Patriarch in 893–901
- Anthony III of Constantinople, Ecumenical Patriarch in 974–979
- Anthony I, Serbian Patriarch, Archbishop of Peć and Serbian Patriarch in 1571–1574
- Anthony II Peter Arida, Maronite Patriarch in 1932–1955
- Anthony III Peter Khoraish, Maronite Patriarch of Antioch and the Whole Levant in 1975–1986
- Anthony I, Eritrean Patriarch, Archbishop of Asmara and Eritrean Patriarch in 2004–2007

== See also ==
- Patriarch (disambiguation)
- Anthony (disambiguation)
- Anthony (given name)
