= Jerotej Sokolović =

Serbian Patriarch

Jerotej Sokolović, also Jeortej I, was the Patriarch of the Serbian Patriarchate of Peć from 1589 to 1591. He succeeded Patriarch Nikanor I on the throne of the Serbian Patriarchate. He was succeeded by Patriarch Filip I.

There are almost no other data about Patriarch Jerotej except for two records. The inscription on the mine, which was left at the Šišatovac Monastery by the scribe hieromonk Georgije, in 1589, says that "it was transcribed in the days of the consecrated archbishop, father and teacher of Serbs and Bulgarians and many other parts of Bishop Cyrus Jerotej".

From the inscription in the manuscript type of the monastery of Orahovica, which was transcribed in the time of Metropolitan kyr-Vasilije of Požega and Patriarch Jerotej, it can be seen that the patriarch managed the house of Saint Sava well because it is said about Kyr-Jerotej:

Patriarch Jerotej died on 17 February 1591.

== See also ==
- List of heads of Serbian Orthodox Church

== Literature ==
- Ilarion Ruvarac (1888), "On the Patriarchs of Peć from Makarije to Arsenij III (1557–1690)", Zadar.
- Djoko Slijepčević (1962), "History of the Serbian Orthodox Church," book 1, Munich: Spark,
- Radovan Samardžić (1993). "Serbian Orthodox Church in the 16th and 17th centuries". History of the Serbian people. book 3, vol. 2. Belgrade: Serbian Literary Association. p. 5—102.
- Sava Vuković (1996), "Serbian hierarchs from the ninth to the twentieth century", Euro, Unirex, Kalenić.
- Vladislav B. Sotirović (2011), "The Serbian Patriarchate of Peć in the Ottoman Empire: The First Phase (1557–94)" (PDF). Serbian Studies: Journal of the North American Society for Serbian Studies. 25 (2): 143—169.
