= Filip Sokolović =

Serbian Patriarch

Filip Sokolović, also Filip I, was the Patriarch of the Serbian Patriarchate of Peć from 1591 to 1592. He succeeded Patriarch Jerotej Sokolović on the patriarchal throne on 15 July 1591. At the time when he was the patriarch, the situation for the Serbian Patriarchate was critical. Filip died in 1592 and Patriarch Jovan Kantul became his heir.

Patriarch Filip is mentioned in an inscription on Symeon the Metaphrast, which was transcribed at the Ozren Monastery by Hierodeacon Timotije.

== See also ==
- List of heads of the Serbian Orthodox Church

== Literature ==
"Filip Sokolović", Folk encyclopedia, Zagreb: Bibliographic Institute, 1927
