= Antonije I =

Serbian Patriarch

- Archbishop of Peć and Serbian Patriarch
- Church: Serbian Patriarchate of Peć
- See: Patriarchate of Peć Monastery
- Installed: 1571
- Term ended: 1574
- Predecessor: Makarije I
- Successor: Gerasim I

Orders
- Rank: Patriarch

Personal details
- Died: 1574
- Denomination: Eastern Orthodoxy

Antonije I Sokolović (Serbian Cyrillic: Антоније I Соколовић) was the Patriarch of the Serbian Patriarchate of Peć from 1571 to 1574. He was the second primate of the restored Serbian Patriarchate of Peć, and the nephew of previous Serbian Patriarch Makarije I.

Antonije was born into the Serbian Sokolović family which gained prominence during the course of the 16th century. Its Christian branch gave several Serbian Patriarchs and Metropolitans, while a second branch (which converted to Islam) gave several viziers of the Ottoman Empire, including the Grand Vizier Mehmed Sokolović (1565–1579). During the patriarchal tenure of his uncle Makarije I (1557–1571), Antonije became Metropolitan of Herzegovina. In 1571, the old patriarch fell ill and convoked a church synod in the Banja Monastery near the city of Priboj. There he relinquished his throne, and Metropolitan Antonije was elected his successor and new Serbian Patriarch. He lived in the Patriarchal Monastery of Peć. In that time, western eparchies of the Serbian Patriarchate were affected by the Ottoman–Venetian War (1570–1573) and massive demographic migrations. Patriarch Antonije stayed on his throne until his death in 1574.

== See also ==
- List of heads of the Serbian Orthodox Church

Eastern Orthodox Church titles
Preceded by Makarije I	Serbian Patriarch; 1571–1574	Succeeded by Gerasim I
Preceded by -	Metropolitan of Herzegovina c. 1570	Succeeded by Savatije Sokolović

== Sources ==
- Bataković, Dušan T., ed. (2005). Histoire du peuple serbe [History of the Serbian People] (in French). Lausanne: L’Age d’Homme.
- Ćirković, Sima (2004). The Serbs. Malden: Blackwell Publishing.
- Fotić, Aleksandar (2009). "Serbian Orthodox Church". Encyclopedia of the Ottoman Empire. New York: Infobase Publishing. pp. 519–520.
- Kašić, Dušan, ed. (1965). Serbian Orthodox Church: Its past and present. Vol. 1. Belgrade: Serbian Orthodox Church.
- Pavlovich, Paul (1989). The History of the Serbian Orthodox Church. Serbian Heritage Books.
- Puzović, Predrag (2010). The Serbian Patriarchate: A history of the Serbian Orthodox Church. Novi Sad: Orthodox Word.
- Rakić, Zoran (2016). "Art of the restored Patriarchate of Peć (1557-1690)". Sacral Art of the Serbian Lands in the Middle Ages. Belgrade: Institute for Byzantine Studies. pp. 497–513.
- Sotirović, Vladislav B. (2011). "The Serbian Patriarchate of Peć in the Ottoman Empire: The First Phase (1557–94)". Serbian Studies: Journal of the North American Society for Serbian Studies. 25 (2): 143–169.
