= Makarije Sokolović =

Serbian patriarch

Saint Makarije Sokolović
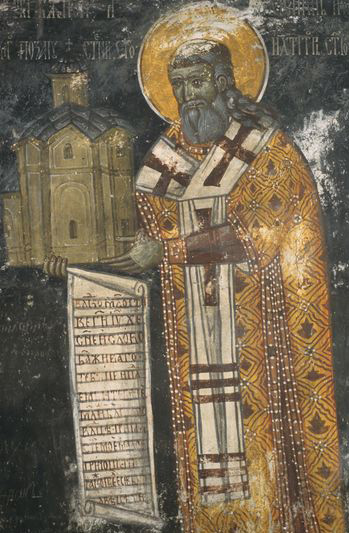
- Fresco depicting Makarije in the Budisavci Monastery

Archbishop of Peć and Serbian Patriarch
- Church: Serbian Patriarchate of Peć
- Installed: 1557
- Term ended: 1571
- Predecessor: Arsenije II
- Successor: Antonije I

Orders
- Rank: Patriarch

Personal details
- Born: Makarije Sokolović Višegrad
- Died: 1574
- Denomination: Eastern Orthodoxy

Sainthood
- Feast day: 30 August (Julian); 12 September (Gregorian)
- Canonized: by Serbian Orthodox Church

Makarije Sokolović (Serbian Cyrillic: Макарије Соколовић; died 1574) was the Patriarch of the Serbian Patriarchate of Peć from 1557 to 1571. He was the first head of the restored Patriarchate of Peć, after its lapse in 1463 that resulted from the Ottoman conquest of Serbia. He is variously reported to have been the brother, nephew, or first cousin of the Ottoman Grand Vizier Mehmed-paša Sokolović, who used his influence in the Ottoman Empire to reestablish the Serbian Patriarchate with its seat in Patriarchate of Peć Monastery. Patriarch Makarije is venerated as a saint in the Serbian Orthodox Church.

== Life ==
He was born in the 16th century, his family hailing from Piva in Old Herzegovina. He was a close kinsman of Mehmed-paša Sokolović, the Ottoman Grand Vizier.

Prior to the re-establishment of the Patriarchate, the Serbs were under the jurisdiction of the Archbishopric of Ohrid. Metropolitan of Smederevo Pavle was one of many that did not recognize the current status of Serb Orthodox population in the Ottoman Empire and sought to make the Serbian Church independent once again. Makarije became the first Patriarch of the renewed Serbian Patriarchate of Peć in 1557. The Ottoman Sultan gave Makarije the same rights as the Patriarch of Constantinople.

The jurisdiction of the Patriarchate was the land of the medieval Serbian state, with Bačka, Banat, Baranya, Syrmia, Slavonia, Bosanska Krajina, Bosnia, Lika, Krbava, and Dalmatia, and had more than 40 eparchies, with the newly founded Eparchy of Trebinje, Eparchy of Požega, etc.

Among renewed monasteries were Banja Monastery in Priboj, Gračanica, Studenica, the Patriarchate of Peć Monastery, and Budisavci. This renewal started a renaissance of the Serbian culture in arts and literature.

Because of illness, he was succeeded in 1571, by his fraternal nephew Antonije Sokolović. He died in 1574.

== Legacy ==
He is included in The 100 most prominent Serbs book.

== See also ==
- List of saints of the Serbian Orthodox Church
- List of heads of the Serbian Orthodox Church

Eastern Orthodox Church titles
Preceded by Arsenije II	Serbian Patriarch; 1557–1571	Succeeded by Antonije I

== Sources ==
- Fotić, Aleksandar (2008). "Serbian Orthodox Church". Encyclopedia of the Ottoman Empire. New York: Infobase Publishing. pp. 519–520. ISBN 9781438110257.
- Слијепчевић, Ђоко М. (1962). Историја Српске православне цркве (History of the Serbian Orthodox Church). Vol. књ. 1. Минхен: Искра.
- Вуковић, Сава (1996). Српски јерарси од деветог до двадесетог века (Serbian Hierarchs from the 9th to the 20th Century). Београд: Евро.
