= Sokollu Mehmed Pasha =

Grand Vizier of the Ottoman Empire from 1565 to 1579

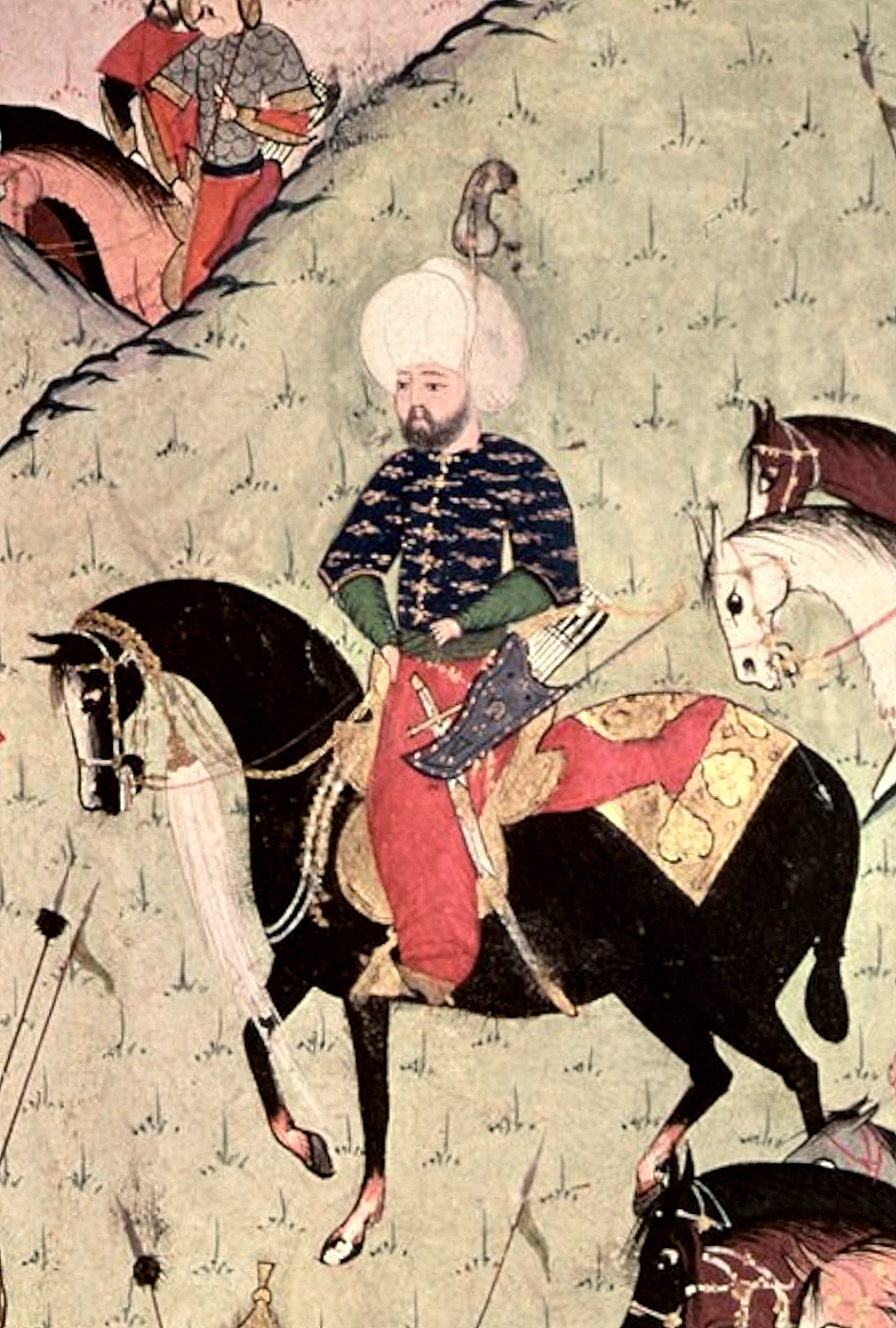
- Contemporary depiction of Sokollu Mehmed Pasha during the Siege of Szigetvár (1566). Nüzhet-i Esrâr (1568-69).
- Born: Bajica Nenadić; 1505; Rudo, Sanjak of Herzegovina, Ottoman Empire (modern-day Rudo, Bosnia and Herzegovina)
- Died: 11 October 1579 (aged 72–73); Constantinople, Ottoman Empire (modern-day Istanbul, Turkey)
- Burial place: Eyüp Sultan Mosque Mausoleum
- Education: Enderun School
- Office: Grand Vizier of the Ottoman Empire
- Predecessor: Semiz Ali Pasha
- Successor: Semiz Ahmed Pasha
- Spouse: Ismihan Sultan (m. 1562)
- Children: Safiye Hanımsultan; Sultanzade Ahmed Bey; Sultanzade Mohammad Ibrahim Pasha; Sultanzade Piri Mehmed Bey
- Military career
- Allegiance: Ottoman Empire
- Branch: Ottoman Army; Ottoman Navy
- Service years: 1541–1579
- Rank: Commander of the Imperial Guard (1543–1546); Kapudan Pasha (Grand Admiral; 1546–1551); Governor-General of Rumelia (1551–1555); Third Vizier (1555–1561); Second Vizier (1561–1565); Grand Vizier (1565–1579)
- Conflicts: Ottoman–Venetian War (1570–73); Ottoman–Hungarian Wars; Russo-Crimean War (1571); Croatian-Ottoman Wars; Ottoman–Safavid War (1532–55); Ottoman–Safavid War (1578–90)

Sokollu Mehmed Pasha (Ottoman Turkish: صوقوللى محمد پاشا, romanized: Sokollu Mehmet Paşa; Serbian: Мехмед-паша Соколовић, romanized: Mehmed-paša Sokolović; pronounced [měxmet pâʃa sokǒːloʋitɕ]; 1505 – 11 October 1579) was an Ottoman statesman. He was most notable for being the grand vizier of the Ottoman Empire. Born in Ottoman Herzegovina into an Orthodox Christian family, Mehmed was abducted as a young boy as part of the so-called "blood tax" to serve as a janissary to the Ottoman devşirme system of recruiting Christian boys to be raised as officers or administrators for the state. He rose through the ranks of the Ottoman imperial system, eventually holding positions as commander of the imperial guard (1543–1546), High Admiral of the Fleet (1546–1551), Governor-General of Rumelia (1551–1555), Third Vizier (1555–1561), Second Vizier (1561–1565), and Grand Vizier (1565–1579, for a total of 14 years, three months, 17 days) under three sultans: Suleiman the Magnificent, Selim II, and Murad III. He was assassinated in 1579, ending his near 15-years of service to several Sultans, as sole legal representative in the administration of state affairs.

Although Sokullu became a Muslim, he remembered his Serbian Orthodox roots and family. He persuaded the Sultan to restore the Serbian Patriarchate of Peć as a "gesture of reconciliation". He appointed members of his family (both Muslim and Christian) to important positions in the Ottoman Empire, including Sokollu Mustafa Pasha, Makarije Sokolović, Ferhad Pasha Sokolović, Sinan-beg Boljanić, Sokolluzade Lala Mehmed Pasha and Lala Mustafa Pasha.

== Biography ==
=== Early years ===
Sokollu's birth name was probably Bajica (Serbian Cyrillic: Бајица), and he was of Bosnian Serb origin. He was said to be born into a modest shepherd family, adherent to the Serbian Orthodox Church, in or near Sokolovići (Turkish: Sokol) in the vicinity of modern-day Rudo. Sokollu is a demonym, derived from his place of birth, whereas the suffix -lu means "from" in Turkish. His father was named Dimitrije. He had two brothers and a sister, who married the older brother of Hüseyin Pasha Boljanić, as well as at least one uncle. However, details about his family and relations are disputed on two major counts. One is his relationship to Makarije Sokolović. Traditionally identified as his brother, today some historians consider him to have been either a nephew or distant relative. The second is the matter of Mehmed's uncle. By some accounts, his uncle was a monk at the Mileševa monastery who had his two nephews, Bajica and Makarije (taken to be brothers according to this view), educated there. Other sources suggest that his uncle converted to Islam early.

=== Janissary education ===
He was renamed Mehmed and, first in Edirne and then in Constantinople, received a thorough Ottoman education as a recruit, first as an apprentice janissary (Turkish: Acemi Oğlan); then in the Enderun or palace school in Topkapı Palace.

As proclaimed in Baghdad on 13 March 1535, Mehmed was sent to be one of the seven retainers of the Imperial Treasurer Iskender Çelebi. Upon Iskender's death, Mehmed returned to Constantinople. In addition to Turkish, he spoke Serbian, Persian, Arabic, Venetian and Latin.

=== Early career ===
Mehmed in 1541 first became an Imperial Chamberlain and then the head of the Sultan's squires. In these positions he became very close to Sultan Suleiman the Magnificent and learned from him.

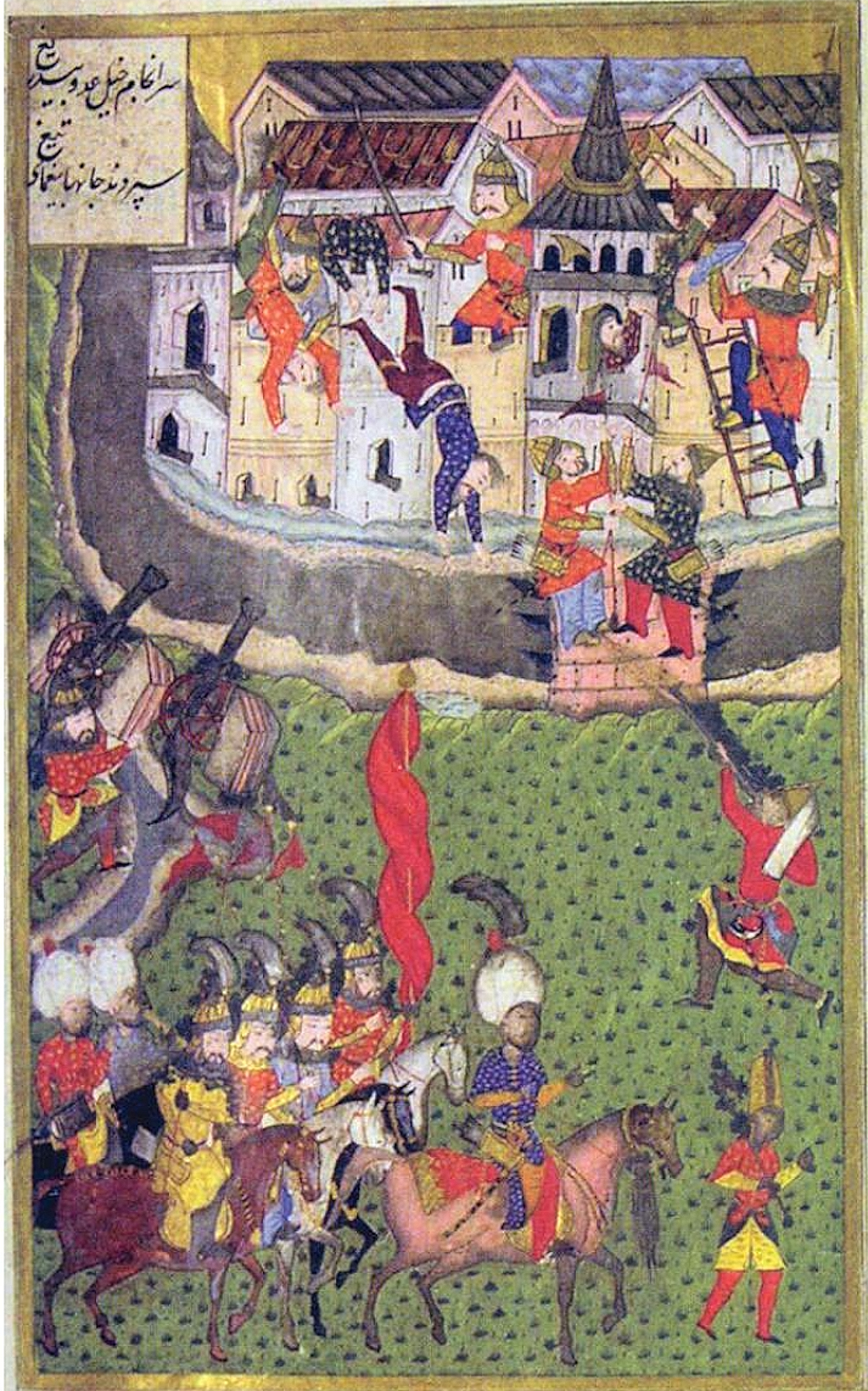
Sokollu (bottom) leading his troops at the Siege of Pecs Castle in 1551. Futūhāt-i jamīla of Arifi, 1557–1558 (Topkapi Palace Museum, H.1592).

As a soldier, Mehmed excelled at the Battle of Mohács and the first Siege of Vienna. In 1546 the Kapudan Pasha Hayreddin Barbarossa died and Mehmed was appointed his successor. In this capacity he was present at the naval expedition against Trablus (present-day Tripoli in Libya). During his five years in this position, Mehmed Pasha greatly strengthened the arsenal of the naval fleet.

Mehmed became Beylerbey (Governor-General) of Rumelia in 1551, headquartered in Sofia. While he was visiting the area of his birth, his mother recognized him by the birthmark on his face and embraced her child for the first time in more than thirty years.

After the death of John Zápolya, king of Hungary as an Ottoman vassal, in 1540, Ferdinand I, Holy Roman Emperor looked to annex Zápolya's lands (the Eastern Hungarian Kingdom). The Hungarian diet had elected infant John Sigismund Zápolya, the son of Zápolya and Isabella Jagiellon, as King of Hungary, which broke the Treaty of Nagyvárad, and Ferdinand I invaded Hungary. Queen Isabella struggled to rule Hungary for her son. Frater George Martinuzzi, appointed by John as regent, opposed her (he would later be created a Cardinal as reward for his accomplishments in this conflict). Ferdinand I sent mercenary leader (condottiero) Bartolomeo Castoldo with more than 7,000 mercenaries who beat a contingent led by Péter Petrovics, killing more than 2,500 of them, near Csanád. The Sultan immediately ordered Sokollu Mehmed Pasha to move into Hungary, so he assembled an army of 90,000 soldiers and fifty-four cannons and also summoned the pashas of Smederevo, Vidin and Nicopolis. When his forces reached Slankamen in Syrmia, George Martinuzzi begged Mehmed not to attack Transylvania, arguing that it had remained in the possession of the Sultan. Mehmed rejected negotiation proposals, led Ottoman forces into Transylvania and soon captured 16 cities, including Bečej, Becskerek, Csanád and Lippa. In this campaign, Sokollu won over to his side local Serb-manned garrisons by pointing out to his common ethnicity with them. Martinuzzi responded by raising a rebellion in Transylvania, mustering one soldier from every household. Mehmed had to fall back and once again laid siege to Temesvár on 14 October with the main part of his army and 50 cannons. Mehmed demanded surrender, but the city's commander, István Losonci, replied with a recommendation for Mehmed's return to Rumelia.

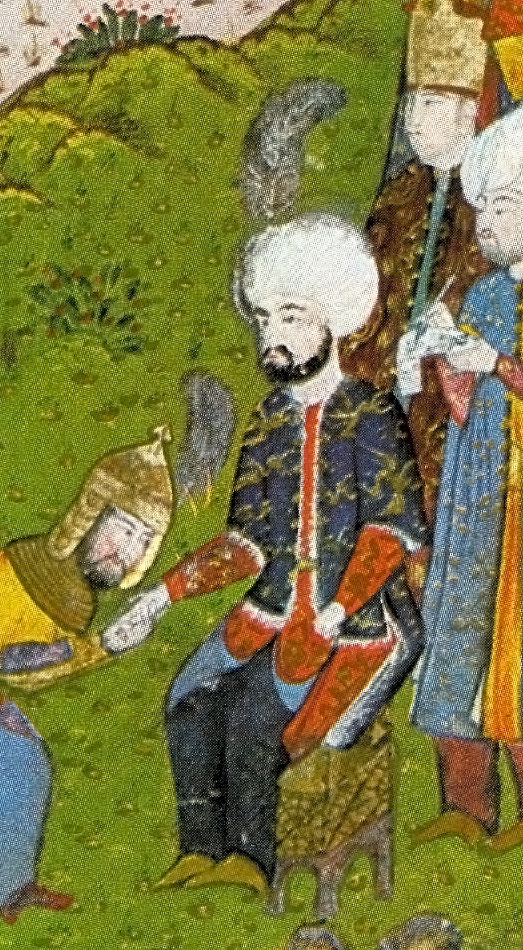
Sokollu Mehmed Pasha receiving enemy troops asking for peace, after the Siege of Temesvár (1552). Futūhāt-i jamīla of Arifi, 1557-1558 (Topkapi Palace Museum, H.1592).

Mehmed besieged the city until 28 October but could not seize it. Retreating to Belgrade, he initiated peace negotiations with the Monk-Viceroy. Martinuzzi was assassinated on 17 December 1551, and peace talks ended. Sokollu Mehmed renewed his military campaign in 1552, seizing Temesvár (see Siege of Temesvár (1552)), Hollókő, Buják, Rétság, Balassagyarmat, the whole of Banat and Szolnok. Sokollu Mehmed's forces then joined with those of Ahmet Pasha advancing towards Eger. Mehmed's army assembled on the Hill of Egid but could not take the city itself.

In 1532, Sultan Suleiman had declared war on Safavid Persia following two decades of peace after the climactic Battle of Chaldiran, when the Persian Shah Tahmasp wanted to take advantage of the Sultan's preoccupation with Hungary and started making armed incursions into Ottoman territory. Sokollu Mehmed was dispatched to spend the winter of 1553/1554 in Tokat to take charge of the final stages of the war against Persia. In June 1554, Mehmed Pasha and the Rumelian troops joined the Sultan's army and took part in the Safavid campaign (1554–1555).

=== Vizier ===
==== Third Vizier ====
Impressed by Sokollu Mehmed's skills, the Sultan made him the Third Vizier in 1555 and he was given a place in the Imperial Council (Divan). His position as Governor-General of Rumelia was given to a Herzegovinian Janissary agha, Pertev Pasha, an old companion of Mehmed's from when they had both served under Iskender Çelebi.

Almost immediately Sokollu Mehmed had to quell a rebellion around Salonica, led by Mustafa Bey, who pretended to be the Sultan's late son Mustafa. Sokollu Mehmed took 4,000 horsemen and 3,000 janissaries and quelled the rebellion. Mustafa Bey was hanged.

Mehmed had a close relative Makarije Sokolović, who was a monk of the Serb Hilandar Monastery on Mount Athos. In 1557, while Mehmed was still the Third Vizier, the final re-establishment of the autocephaly of the Serbian Orthodox Church was achieved, through the restoration of the Serbian Patriarchate of Peć, with Mehmed's cousin Makarije Sokolović becoming new Serbian Patriarch as Makarije I, who was succeeded in 1571 by another family member Antonije Sokolović, as Patriarch Antonije I.

When the former Grand Vizier Ahmet Pasha was deposed and hanged, he was replaced by Rüstem Pasha, who had numerous enemies. One of them was Lala Mustafa, who instigated the Sultan's third son, Bayezid, then Beylerbey of Karaman, to raise a rebellion against his brother and heir-apparent Selim. Sokollu Mehmed mustered an army and went to Konya, where he decisively defeated Bayezid's forces in May 1559. Bayezid fled to Persia. Sokollu Mehmed remained in Asia and spent the winter negotiating with the Persian Shah regarding Bayezid's extradition. After long negotiations, the Shah handed over Bayezid and his four sons, who were subsequently executed.

==== Second Vizier ====
In 1561, Grand Vizier Rüstem Pasha died and was succeeded by the Second Vizier, Semiz Ali Pasha. Sokollu Mehmed Pasha in turn became Second Vizier, while Pertev Pasha became Third Vizier.

On 17 August 1562, Sokollu Mehmed married Sultan Suleiman's granddaughter – Prince Selim's daughter – Ismihan Sultan (some sources read her name as Esma Han Sultan). Mehmed spent the following years in peace, governing and administering the realm.

In 1563, Mehmed's nephew, Sokollu Mustafa Bey, became sanjakbey of the Sanjak of Bosnia.

=== Grand Vizier ===
In June 1565, Grand Vizier Semiz Ali Pasha died. Sultan Suleiman had much confidence in Sokollu Mehmed Pasha and promoted him to this position.

==== War with the Habsburgs ====
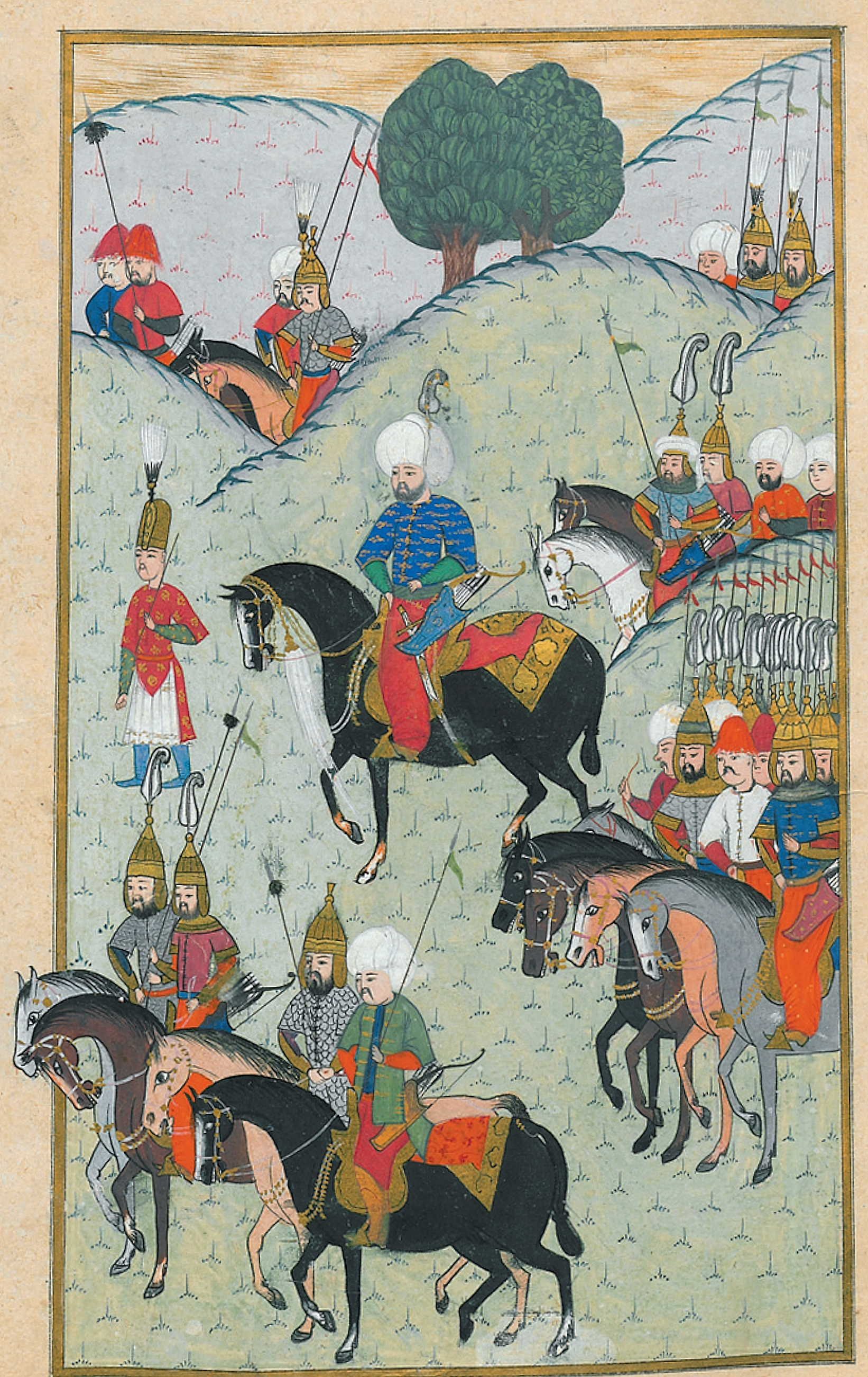
Sokollu Mehmed Pasha accompanied by his troops at the Siege of Szigetvár (1566). Nüzhet-i Esrâr (1568–1569).

In late 1565 and early 1566, tensions between the Holy Roman Emperor Maximilian II and Sultan Suleiman grew. Maximilian wanted the cities previously taken by Telli Hasan Pasha restored to him. When negotiations failed, Maximilian declared war and Grand Vizier Sokollu Mehmed Pasha ordered his nephew, Sokollu Mustafa Bey of Bosnia, to advance against Maximilian. Sokollu Mustafa managed to capture the cities of Krupa and Dvor na Uni. The Sultan immediately declared war against the Holy Roman Empire, and Sokollu Mehmed began the preparations for the army's advance. The Grand Vizier went ahead, preparing for the arrival of the Sultan, who was leading the main part of the Ottoman forces. After 50 days, they arrived in Belgrade.

Passing through Zemun, one part of the army crossed Varaždin and struck Egar before proceeding towards Vienna. Nikola Šubić Zrinski (Miklós Zrínyi) had defeated the sanjakbey Tirhal Mohammed, executing him and his son, and capturing 17,000 ducats. This incurred the Sultan's wrath, and he dispatched Sokollu Mehmed's forces to besiege Szigetvár, while Suleiman remained in Harsang. The commander of Budin, Arslan Pasha, lost the cities of Várpalota, Veszprém and Tata. The Sultan sent a platoon of fifteen troopers to bring him Arslan Pasha's head, but Arslan had already left his forces three days earlier and was on his way to the Sultan. The Sultan showed Sokollu Mehmed a letter in which Arslan had insulted him, and on 3 August, when Arslan reported to Mehmed's tent with 15 heavily armed horsemen, Sokollu Mehmed criticized Arslan for his conduct, accused him of treason and stripped him of his post, giving it instead to his nephew Sokollu Mustafa.

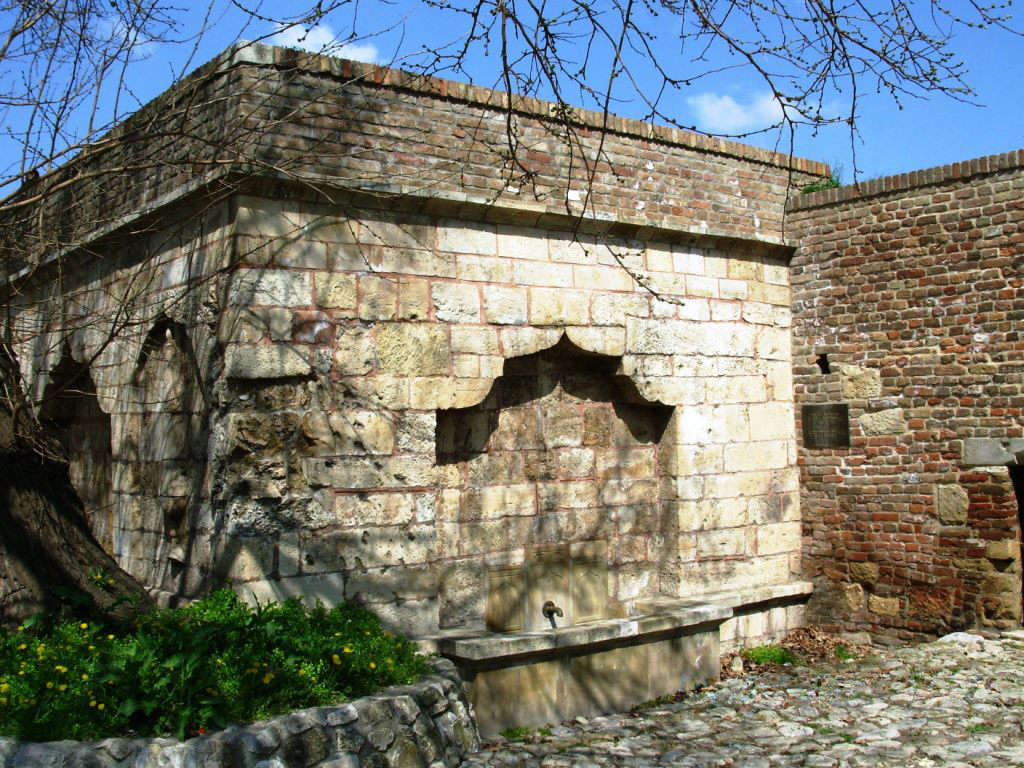
Fountain of Mehmed Pasha Sokolović in Belgrade from 1578. (Sokollu Mehmed Pasha Caravanserai with Bedestan in Belgrade - 3D Animation)

The Sultan arrived with Sokollu Mehmed's sons, Kurt Bey and Hasan Bey, at Pécs. Finally, the large Ottoman force, which numbered between 100,000 and 300,000 soldiers and 300 cannons, laid siege to Szigetvár. The Battle of Szigetvár was an Ottoman victory, with heavy losses on both sides. Both commanders died during the battle: while Zrinsky was killed in the final charge, Suleiman the Magnificent died in his tent from natural causes, before the Turks achieved victory. According to Robert William Fraser, more than 10,000 large cannonballs where shot into the fortress during the siege.

Sokollu Mehmed Pasha had all witnesses to the Sultan's death executed, and announced that Suleiman was too sick to perform his duties and that he would be healing in Szigetvár, while he would be acting on the Sultan's behalf. Sokollu Mehmed rewarded those involved in the capture of Szigetvár and increased the soldiers' wages. He sent a part of the army to capture Babócsa. The Tartars, however, spread the news of the Sultan's death, and Sokollu Mustafa Bey wrote to Prince Selim about his father's death. Selim marched immediately towards Srem. Upon his arrival in Vukovar, Sokollu Mehmed wrote him that it would be best if he went to Belgrade to greet his army for a more formal and effective take-over of the Empire. Selim returned to Belgrade, and Mehmed ordered the army to march towards the town. Forty days after the Sultan's death, in October 1566, the army set out for Belgrade. At the fourth stop on the way to Belgrade, forty-eight days after Suleiman's death, Sokollu Mehmed announced the Sultan's death ceremonially, during the traditional reading of the Koran. Sokollu Mehmed had Suleiman's body embalmed and ordered the army to proceed to meet the new Sultan in Belgrade. After three marches, the army arrived in Sremska Mitrovica. Mehmed reminded Selim to send gifts to the viziers, pashas and the army, but Selim's advisors convinced the new Sultan not to do so. Sokollu Mehmed went to Belgrade and swore allegiance to Selim II as his Sultan, and Selim confirmed him as his Grand Vizier.

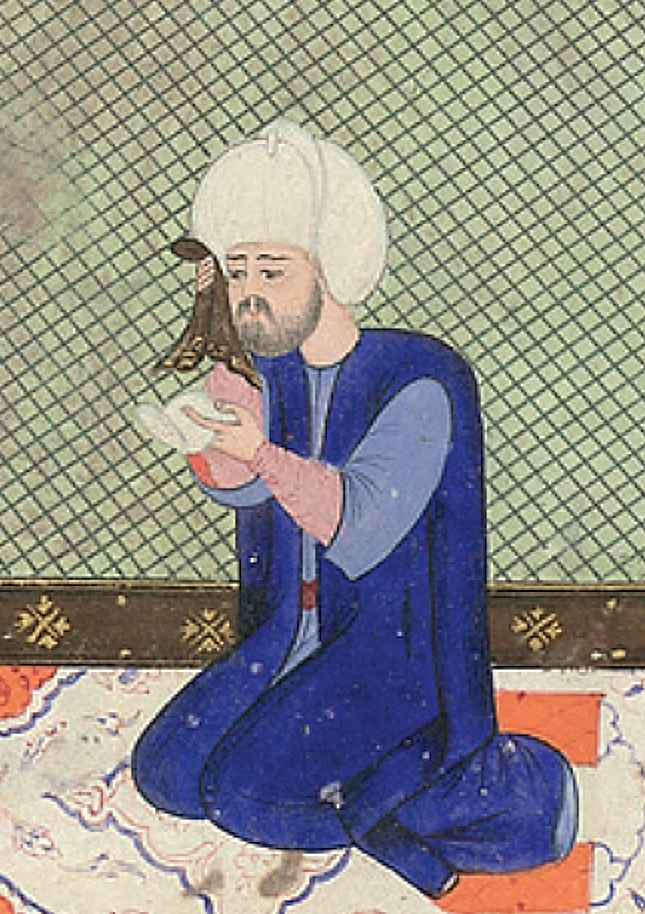
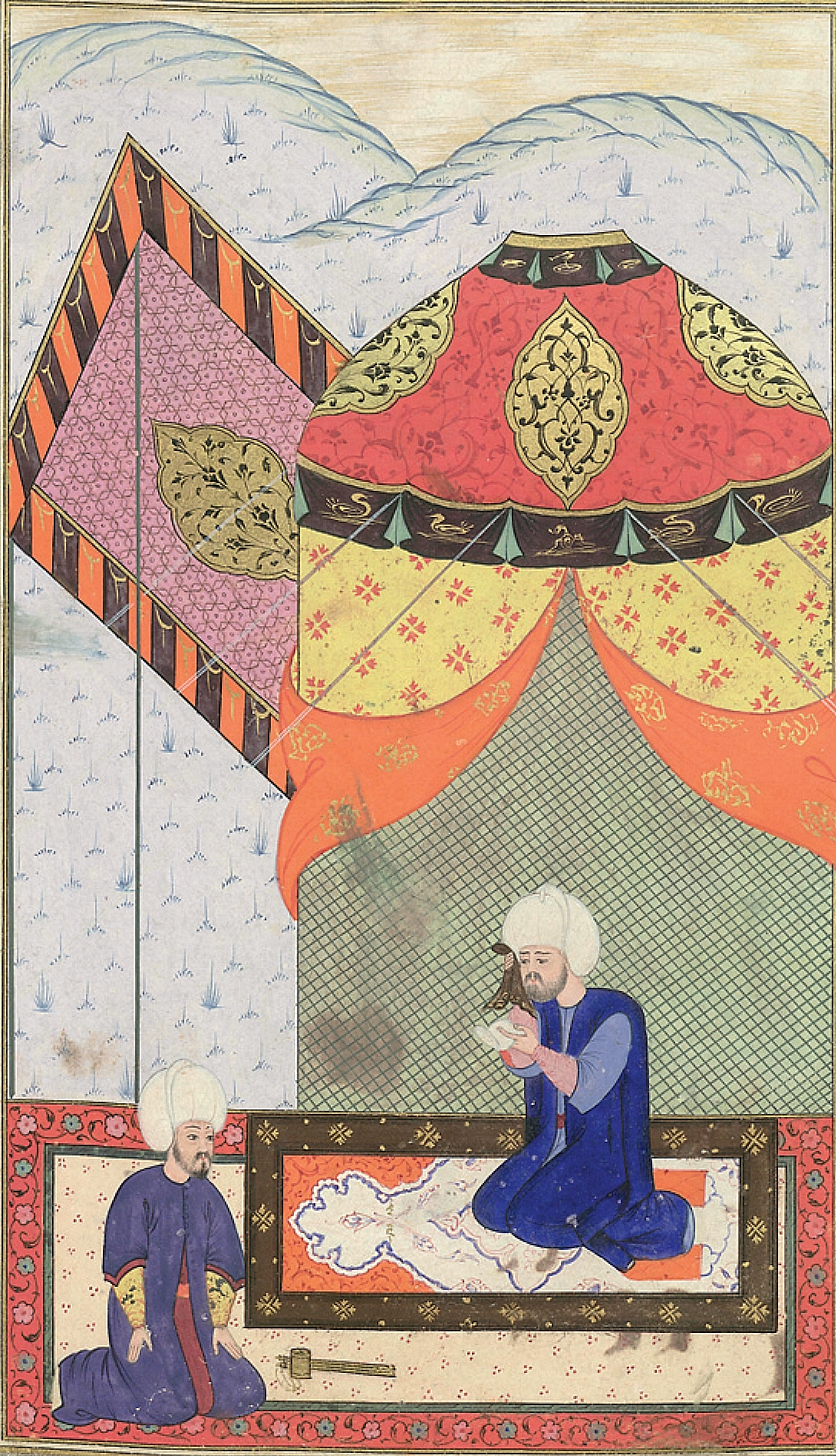
Sokollu Mehmed Pasha, attended by Feridun Ahmed Beg, mourning Suleiman's death in 1566. Nüzhet-i Esrâr, TSMK H.1339 (1568–1569).

Expecting a mutiny among the military in the capital, Sokollu Mehmed had Suleiman's body sent to Constantinople to restore order amongst the janissaries and other officials, who now demanded more compensation for their past efforts. In Belgrade, Sultan Selim II called a council, as even some of his closest officials were openly mocking him. Sokollu Mehmed assured him that he would manage everything effectively, and distributed gifts to the troops, rewarding them handsomely to regain their loyalty.

On the fifth day of their stay in Belgrade, the Sultan, Sokollu Mehmed and the army departed for Constantinople. Before they managed to return to the Empire's capital, a mutiny broke out and the road to the city was blocked, and Sokollu Mehmed and Ahmed Pasha had to bribe their way into the city. Order was restored after Sokollu Mehmed convinced the Sultan to promise to send handsome gifts and higher wages to the janissaries. The next morning, each janissary was given standard pay of 40 ducats and an additional 20 ducats as an accession bonus. Soon, the other branches of the military, the sipahis and mercenaries, demanded higher wages as well. Mehmed arrested and replaced their aghas at once, finally stopping all dissent.

Two years after Selim's accession, on 17 February 1568, Sokollu Mehmed succeeded in concluding at Edirne a peace treaty with Emperor Maximilian II, whereby the Emperor agreed to pay an annual "honorary present" of 30,000 ducats.

The Islamic scholars opposed Sokollu, and viewed him as a dictatorial vizier. As hee benefited from Selim II leaving all state affairs to the government and Mehmet.

==== Expedition to Sumatra ====
One of Sokollu's greatest responsibilities was planning an Ottoman invasion of Sumatra in 1567. Historical records from the time show that Sokollu played an active role in the strategic execution of the invasion and that he was extremely detailed in the logistics. Later on, Sokollu would also participate in the expedition as a commander. According to these historical records, between November and December 1567 Sokollu and his expedition took sail to Aceh with fifteen fully armed war galleys and two transport galleys. Upon a seemingly friendly arrival to Aceh, the sultan of Sumatra requested that all the members of the expedition follow his orders. The sultan later offered his loyalty to the Ottoman Empire and forged a bond of mutual understanding between Istanbul and Aceh.

==== Expedition to Yemen ====
Immediately after the expedition to Sumatra, the Ottoman Empire suffered a major rebellion from one of their most important settlements. An uprising led by Zaydi Imam in Yemen created substantial uncertainty in the region which Sokollu had to give imminent priority before taking any further action in Aceh. While the insurrection in Yemen started in the summer of 1567, it was not taking seriously by the Ottoman regime until later in the year, when most of the major cities in the region came under fire by the rebellious factions. It is believed that the cause of the dissatisfaction in Yemen was the intensified Ottoman involvement in the region as a prelude for an expansion in the Indian Ocean. The unhappiness in the Ottoman Yemen also went back to the rule of Governor Mahmud Pasha, a compatriot of Sokollu, who managed to produce large economic gains in the region at the expense of the wellbeing of the population. After Mahmud's wrongdoings in Yemen had been revealed, Sokollu decided to appoint Koja Sinan, who was assigned the responsibilities to appease the turmoils in Yemen.

==== Suez Canal ====
Although the rebellions in Yemen once again forced Sokollu to postpone any further military action in Sumatra and the Indian Ocean, it also opened the possibility to promote one of his favorite projects: and attempt to build a canal from the Mediterranean to Suez. He instructed the governor of Egypt to send architects engineers to assess the possibility of this canal, with the purpose of allowing a better connection from Muslims attempting to visit the Holy Cities. Sokollu also was concerned about Muslims from the northeast, Crimea and Anatolia, who had to cross the Black Sea in order to visit the Holy Cities. Thus, he took actions for the construction of an open canal between the Don and the Volga in the north.

==== Wars with Russia, Venice and the Holy League ====
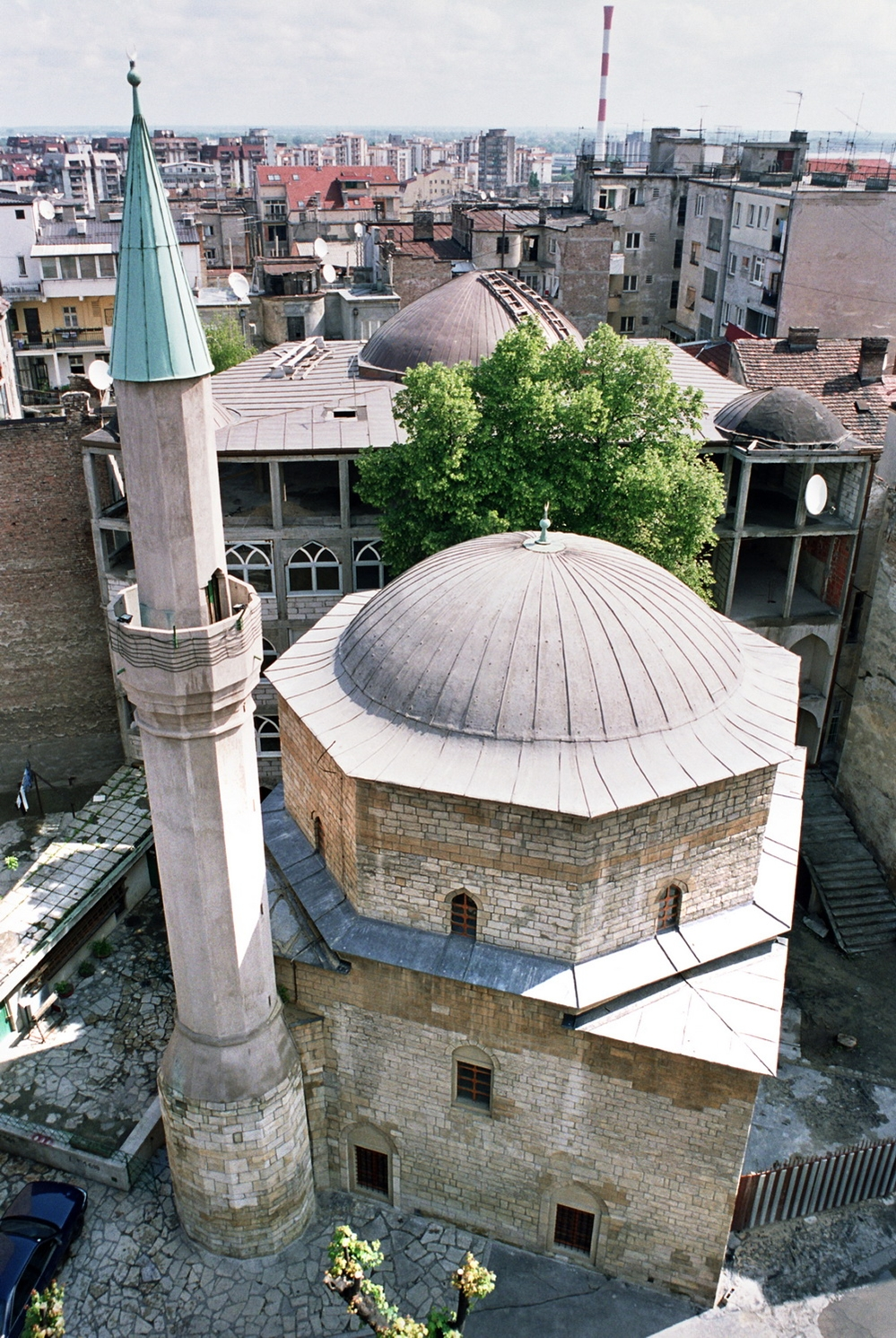
The Bajrakli Mosque, Belgrade, build at the time of Sokollu Mehmed Pasha in 1575 (See also: Belgrade printing house from 1552.)

Mehmed Pasha had little success against Russia, and the first encounter between the Ottoman Empire and her future northern rival presaged the disaster to come. A plan had been devised at Constantinople for connecting the Volga and Don by a canal, and in the summer of 1569 a large force of janissaries and cavalry was sent to lay siege to Astrakhan and begin the canal works, while an Ottoman fleet besieged Azov. However, a sortie of the garrison of Astrakhan drove back the besiegers. A Russian army of 15,000 men attacked and scattered the workmen and the Tatar force sent for their protection, and the Ottoman fleet was destroyed by a storm. Early in 1570 the ambassadors of Ivan the Terrible concluded at Constantinople a treaty which restored friendly relations between the Sultan and the Tsar.

Although the government was weakening, Sokollu Mehmed Paşa managed to expand the borders of the Ottoman Empire greatly. In 1570 he dispatched Sinan Pasha to conquer Arabia. Sinan Pasha solemnly declared the reign of Sultan Selim II in Mecca upon finishing his military campaign in Hejaz and Yemen.

From 1571 to 1572, on the order of Mehmed's wife Ismihan Sultan (or Esma Han Sultan), the famous architect Mimar Sinan built the Sokollu Mehmed Paşa Mosque, which an authoritative guide to Constantinople states to be "The most beautiful of the smaller mosques in Istanbul, a minor masterpiece by Sinan".

During the rule of Sokollu Mehmed Pasha as Grand Vizier, the Ottoman navy and army took Cyprus in 1571 from Venice. The administration of Cyprus was given to Mehmed's old friend, the Arab Ahmed Pasha. The invasion of Cyprus led to the formation of a so-called Holy League, comprising the Pope, Spain with Naples and Sicily, the Republic of Venice, Genoa, Tuscany, and the Knights of Malta. On 7 October 1571, the coalition's fleet under the command of Don Juan of Austria decisively defeated the Ottoman fleet under Müezzinzade Ali Pasha in the Battle of Lepanto.

Sokollu Mehmed Pasha immediately ensured that Piyale Pasha and Uluç Ali Reis, the new Grand Admiral, were provided with all the necessary means and resources to rebuild the Empire's shattered fleet. By July 1572 the Ottoman fleet already numbered 250 fully equipped warships "including eight of the largest capital ships ever seen in the Mediterranean". It is reported in Turkish chronicles that Sokollu Mehmed Pasha had said to the Venetian Ambassador "By conquering Cyprus we have cut off one of your arms; at Lepanto by defeating our navy you have only shaved off our beard. However, you know that a cut-off arm cannot be replaced but shaved-off beard grows thicker." Indeed, the Holy League ships had to retire to ports and Ottoman naval supremacy in the Mediterranean was restored. The new Ottoman Navy that started a naval expedition in summer of 1573 under Uluç Ali Reis found no rivals in the Mediterranean and ravaged the coasts of Sicily and southern Italy and in 1574 it captured Tunis from the Hafsids, who for some time had been supported by Spanish troops, thus restoring Ottoman domination in the Western Mediterranean.

On 3 March 1573, the Venetian Republic signed a new peace treaty with the Ottomans under Mehmed Pasha, thereby bringing the Holy League to an end, accepting the loss of Cyprus and increasing the tribute payments. He also extended for eight more years the peace treaty with the Holy Roman Empire and maintained good relations with France, Poland-Lithuania and Russia. He was preparing for a fresh attack on Venice when the Sultan's death on 12 December 1574 cut short his plans.

==== Final years ====
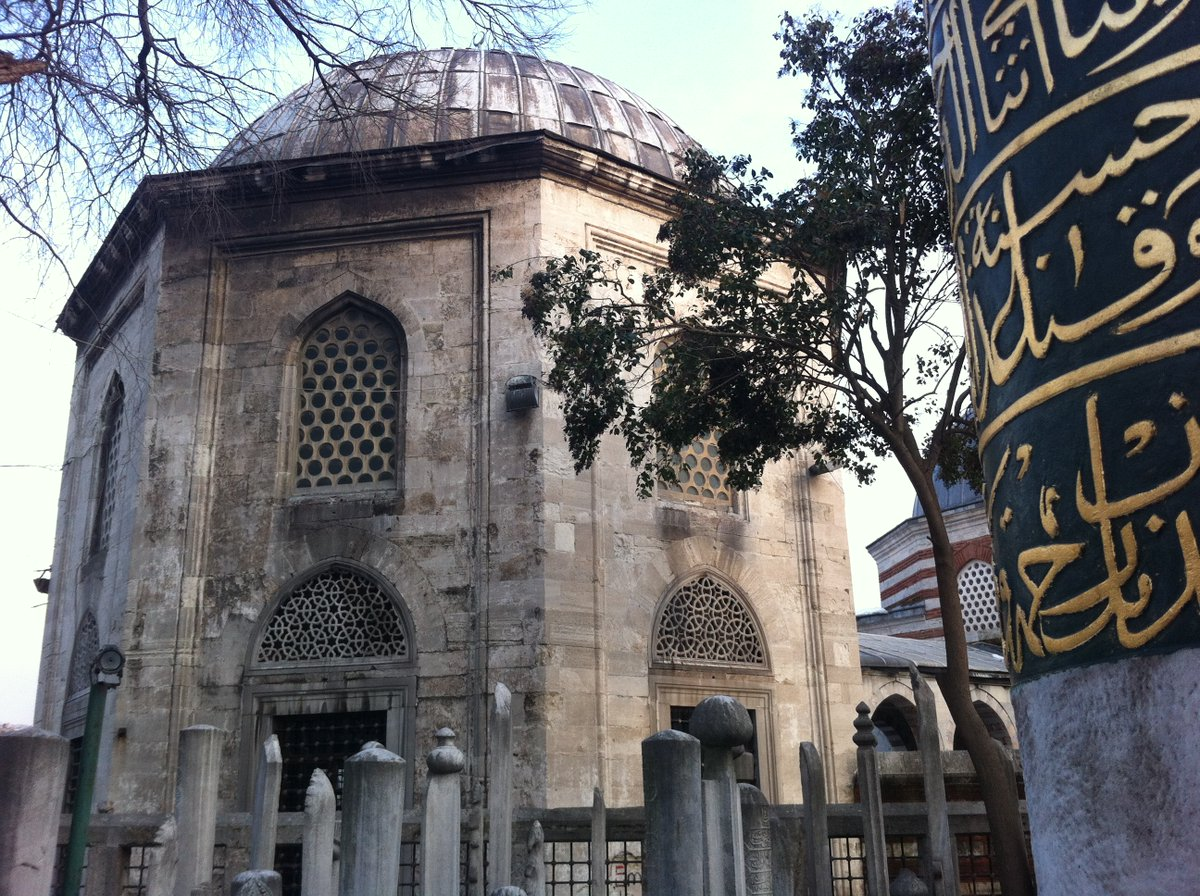
Tomb of Sokollu Mehmed Pasha in the Eyüp Sultan Mosque

Sokollu Mehmed Pasha's wealth reached its peak around 1573, when the value of his personal property (cash, goods, accounts, objects) amounted to 18 million ducats. Mehmed received the standard Grand Vizier's wage of 20 ducats every day. His wealth increased greatly through gifts and taxes of Ottoman officials: anyone who became a vizier had to pay Mehmed Pasha 50,000 to 60,000 ducats, and every Governor-General had to pay 15,000 to 20,000 or even sometimes 30,000 to 40,000 ducats upon ascending to the office. The provincial governor of Egypt at Cairo alone dispatched 100,000 ducats to the Grand Vizier every year.

On 30 August 1574, Grand Vizier Sokollu Mehmed Pasha installed his nephew Antonije Sokolović, then the Metropolitan of Hum, as the new Eastern Orthodox Archbishop of Ohrid. On 23 October the same year, upon the death of Patriarch Makarije, Antonije became the new Serbian Patriarch. Antonije died soon, in 1575, and was replaced by yet another one of Mehmed's nephews, Gerasim Sokolović.

When Sultan Selim II died, Sokollu Mehmed Pasha again kept this secret until Selim's oldest son Murad arrived from his governor's post in Manisa. Sokollu Mehmed Pasha acknowledged the new Sultan, Murad III, and remained Grand Vizier, but now he had to cope with the rising political influence of the palace women, first with Sultan's mother Nurbanu Sultan and then his wife, of Albanian origin, Safiye Sultan. Murad III gradually soured on Sokollu Mehmed's overwhelming power within the Empire, and the Grand Vizier's influence declined.

Sokollu Mehmed Pasha was involved in the succession disputes of the Polish Crown in 1576 and 1577, but this did not reach greater measures.

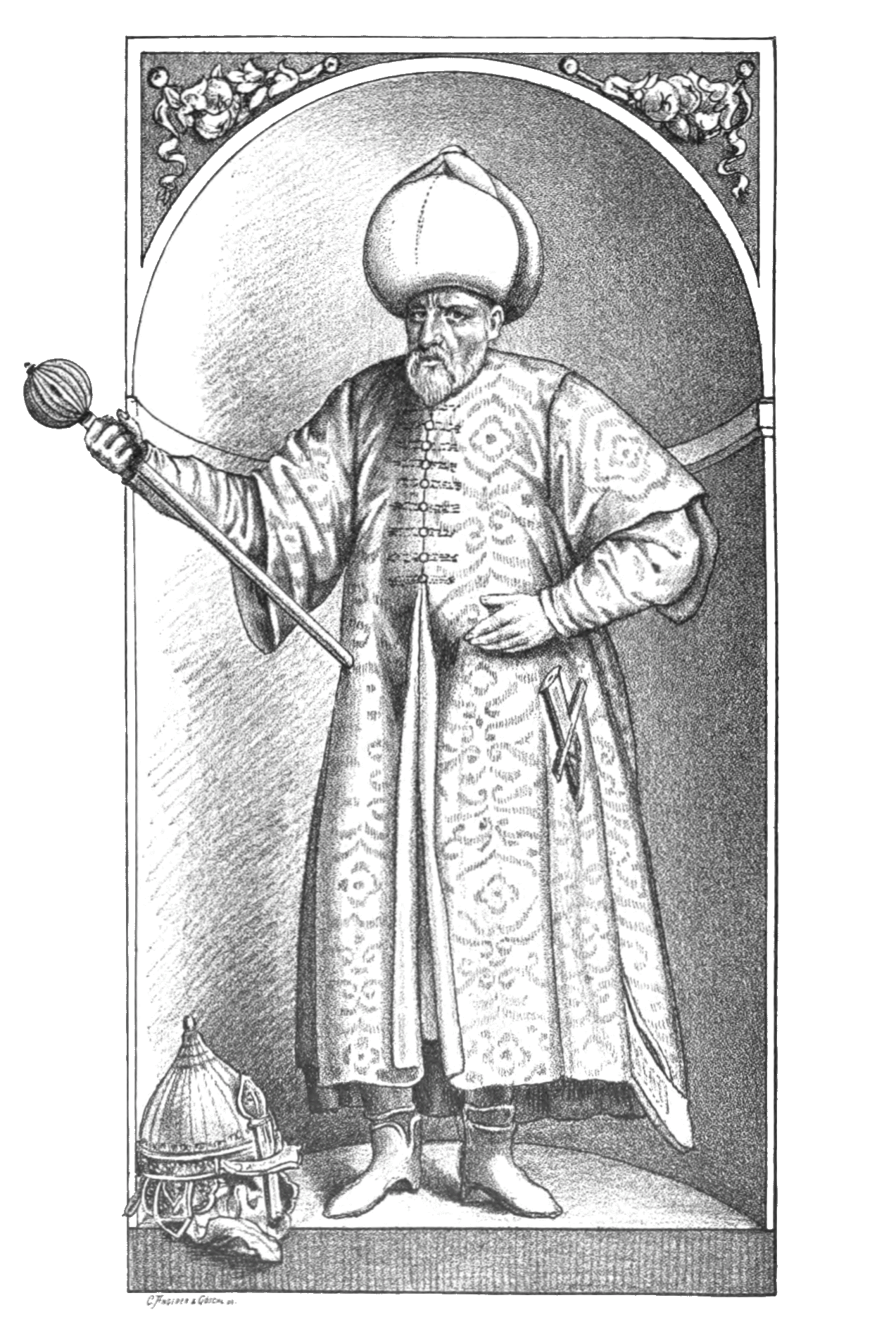
Imaginary depiction of Sokollu Mehmed Pasha by Ivan Kukuljević Sakcinski (1886)

Sokollu Mehmed signed numerous treaties of friendship with Venice, Florence, Spain, England and Switzerland. He also managed to force a number of European states to pay tribute: Austria paid 9,000 ducats; Transylvania 3,000; Wallachia 7,000; Moldavia 3,000. Eventually, even Venice had to pay him 4,000 ducats annually. This altogether gave him an annual income of 31,000 gold ducats.

Mehmed was initially known to be opposed to the war with Persia, which began in 1578, but was overruled upon eventually, amongst the reasons being the constant urgings by Sokollu Mehmed to take advantage of the Ottomans neighboring rival. Sultan Murad III time afterwards, began to limit his Grand Vizier's powers by slowly removing his allies from high offices. The state secretary Feridun, an old companion of Sokollu mehmed's since the siege of Szigetvár, was sent to Belgrade, away from Constantinople. Mehmed's faithful Arab friend, the Governor-General of Cyprus, was lynched by mutinous soldiers. Mehmed's greatest rivals, Hamid Efendi and Piyale Pasha, arranged the execution of the Grand Vizier's Greek protege, Michael Kantakouzenos. On 10 October 1578, Sokollu Mustafa Pasha, Sokollu Mehmed Pasha's nephew and beylerbey (governor-general) of Budin, was assassinated (some sources put it as 30 September 1578). On the anniversary of this day, on 10 October 1579, Sokollu Mehmed had his servant Hasan Bey read to him about the Battle of Kosovo.

== Death ==
On 11 October 1579, Sokollu Mehmed Pasha was assassinated, ending his near 15-year rule serving as the sultan sole legal representative in the administration of state affairs. There are some who claim that the assassin was a janissary in disguise in employment of Safiye Sultan, the wife of Murad III. Also, some sources claim that Sokollu Mehmed was a target of Hashshashin agent, as he was opposed to war with Persia where this order was stationed, which was not in their interest, although this is a very controversial claim as this order was destroyed by Mongols long time before. In 1579, he was succeeded as grand vizier by Semiz Ahmed Pasha.

He is buried at his complex, Sokollu Mehmed Paşa Külliyesi at the back of Eyüp Mosque, in Istanbul, at the Sokollu Mehmed Paşa Türbe built by famous architect Mimar Sinan for him c. 1572. His wife Ismihan (or Esma Han) is buried near him and in the little garden of the Türbe are buried the family and descendants of Sokollu Mehmed Pasha.

=== Aftermath ===
After his death Sultan Murad III changed grand viziers ten times in sixteen years. These frequent changes in government were part of the general instability in the Ottoman government that followed the death of Sokollu Mehmet Pasha, evidence of a decline in the empire that he had at its pinnacle while he was in office.

== Heritage and legacy ==
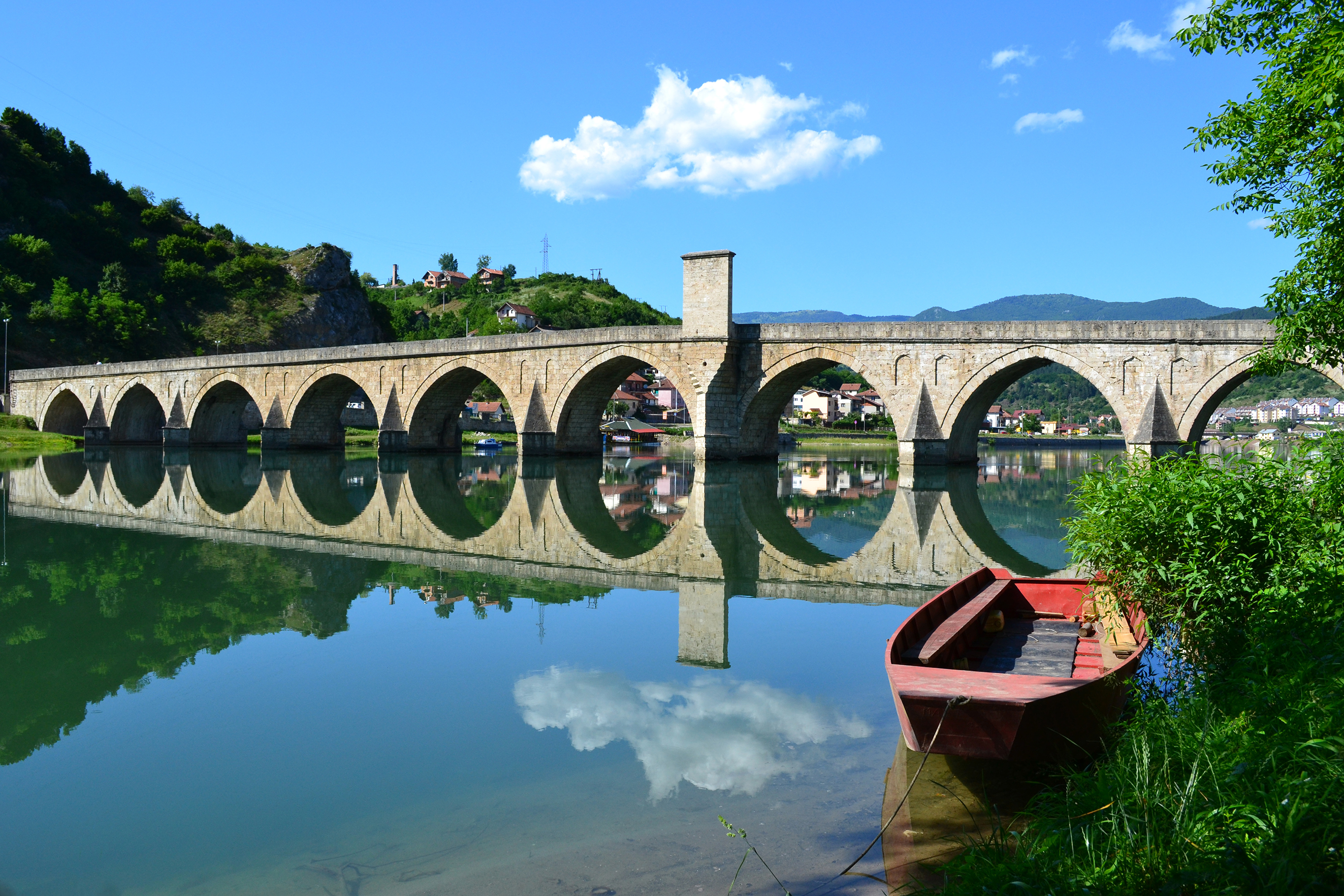
Mehmed Paša Sokolović Bridge in Višegrad, Mehmed's most famous endowment from 1577. Masterpiece of architect Mimar Sinan.

Sokollu Mehmed Pasha has left numerous buildings in Constantinople and throughout Ottoman territories. Foundations of his buildings are spread over Edirne, Halep, Medina, Bečkerek, Belgrade and alongside Bosnia, where he is especially remembered for his bridges. Mecca and Constantinople also contain some of his mosques.

The Sokollu Mehmed Pasha Mosque and the complex built at Kadirga district of İstanbul by architect Mimar Sinan is considered to be one of the most beautiful small mosques in İstanbul. It is known for its fine ordering of medrese over the entry stairs, its lofty interior, the first hooded fountain, ogival arches of the arcades, and the finely preserved Iznik tiles.

His most renowned endowment is the eleven-arched Višegrad bridge in his hometown of Višegrad. The construction and history of the bridge is the topic of the novel The Bridge on the Drina (Serbian: Na Drini ćuprija - На Дрини ћуприја), written by Nobel laureate Ivo Andrić, a Yugoslav novelist His life also interested the Yugoslav writer Meša Selimović. There were numerous Serbian, Croatian and Bosnian legends about the bridge's construction. According to one, Mehmed Paşa built the bridge in his son's name. Another is the tale of its architect Rade, which is described in "Bridge on the Drina".

Sokollu Mehmed Pasha is often credited as the mastermind of the Ottoman Empire's last great push into the Indian Ocean. Aside from his political achievements, Sokollu was also very interested in the arts and sciences, which led to several important contributions. For example, he often funded paintings by renowned Veronese artists as well as imported glassware from Italian artisans. He also worked together with prominent Ottoman geographers and historians of his time, including Feridun Ahmed Beg, Sipahazade Mahmed, and Kutbeddin Mekki.

Other elements of his architectural legacy include:

- The Azapkapi Mosque, built by Sinan between 1577 and 1578 in the Azapkapi district of İstanbul, is considered most important Ottoman monument in Galata.
- The Sokollu Mehmed Paşa Kulliyesi, built by Sinan c. 1572 in the Eyub district of İstanbul, is a complex including a medrese, a school and his tomb
- The Sokollu Mehmed Paşa Complex built in 1549 and extended at 1569, both times by Sinan. Located on the main highway between the two Ottoman capitals of İstanbul and Edirne, at Luleburgaz, it is a complex of caravanserai, bathhouse, mosque, madrasah, a school, market streets and later, private apartments for Sultan's use.
- Complexes built at Havsa, a city on the Istanbul-Edirne highway and in Payas, in southern Turkey near Antakya.
- Bridges at Alpullu, Luleburgaz and Corlu, built by Sinan
- The bridge at Arslanagića Most in Trebinje
- Vizier's bridge in Podgorica
- The bridge on Žepa and the Goat's Bridge in Sarajevo
- Public bathhouses in Havsa, Yesildirek (İstanbul), Edirne and Luleburgaz public bathhouses, built by Sinan
- The Black Mosque in Sofia, built by Mimar Sinan during the years when Sokollu Mehmed Pasha was governor of Rumelia and later converted into a church in the 19th century
- A Road of four paces and a castle between Višegrad and Sarajevo, on Glasinac. Of the castle, only a drinking-fountain remains, which is known as the Mehmed Sokolović's han.
- A mosque, maktab and musafirhana (guest house) in his native village of Sokolovići

== Issue ==
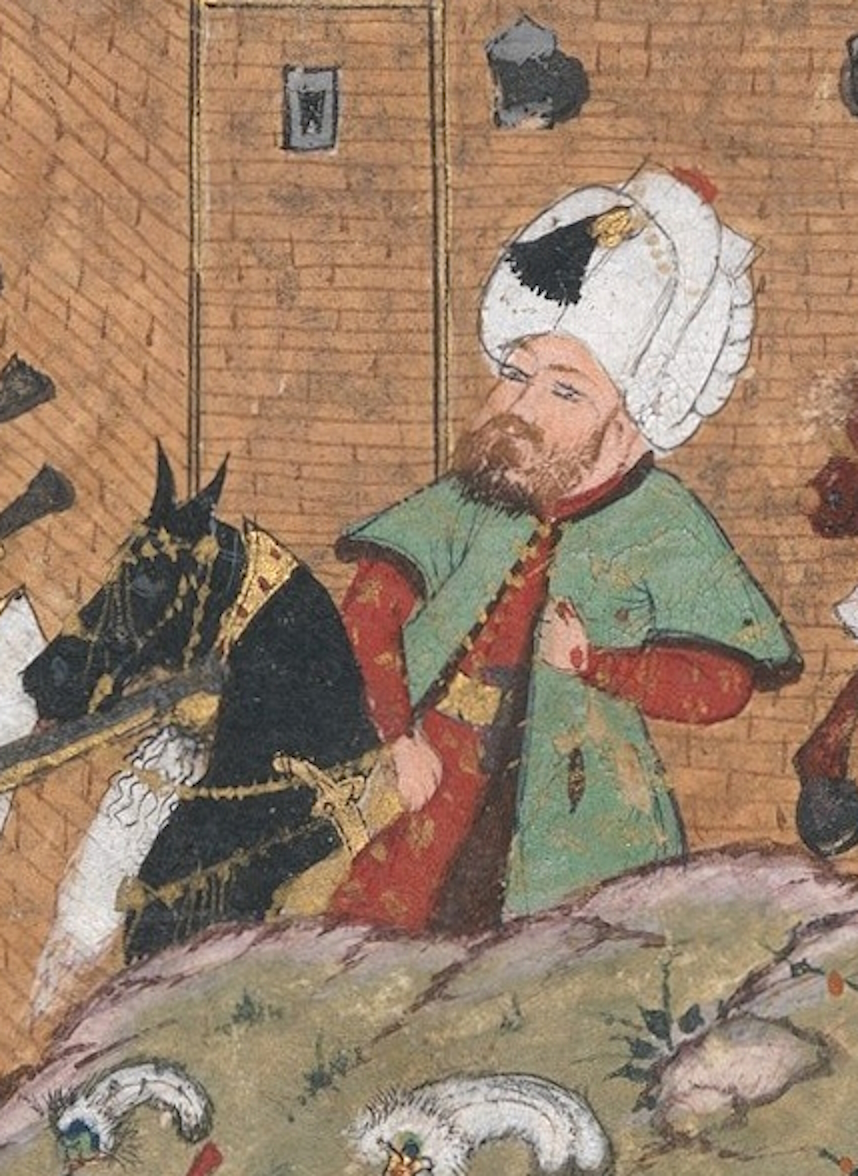
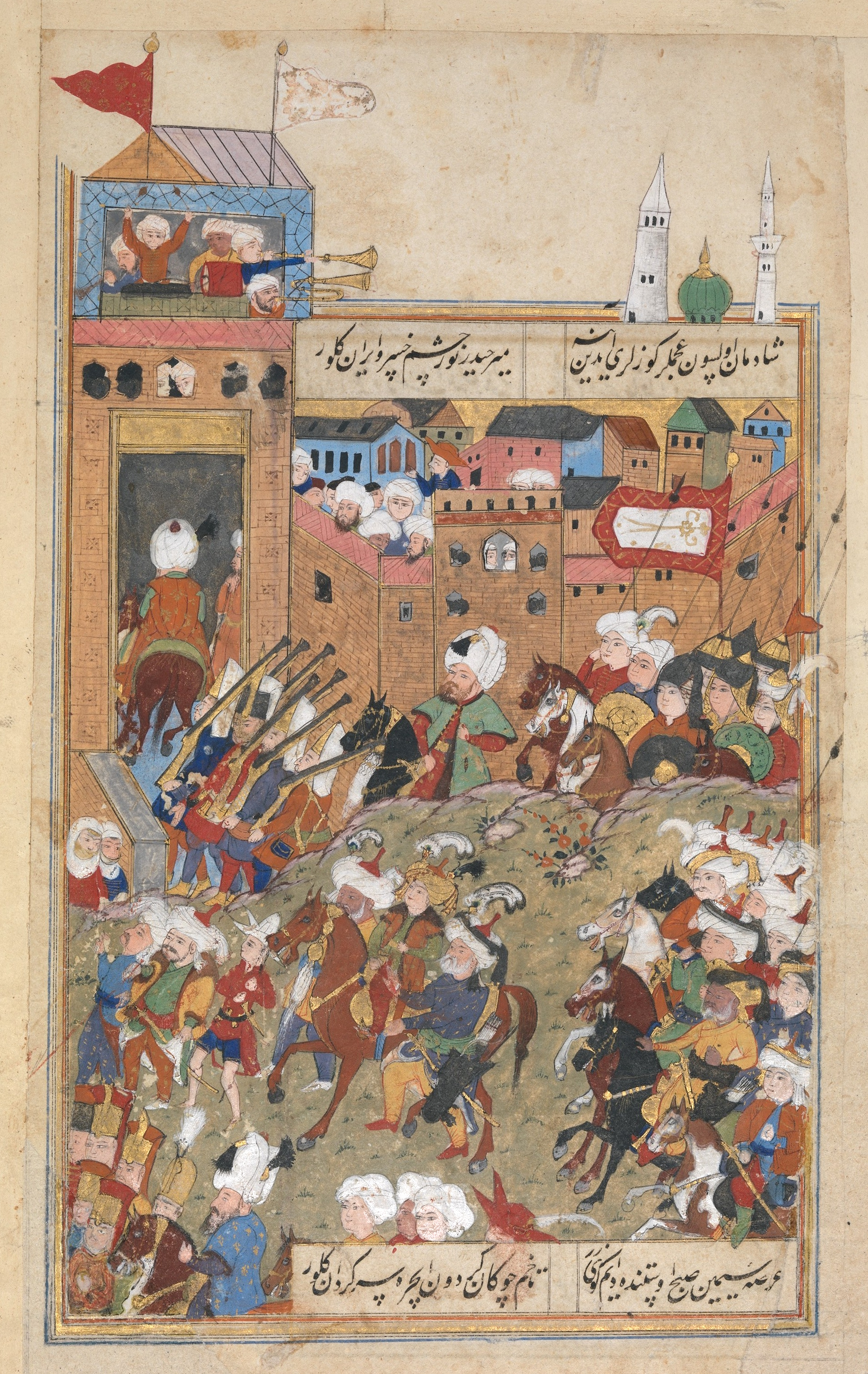
Sokulluzade Hasan Pasha, son of Sokollu Mehmed Pasha, here in 1590 escorting the hostage Safavid Prince Haydar Mirza into Istanbul. Divan of Mahmud Abd al-Baki (1590–1595).

The mausoleum of Sokollu Mehmed Pasha in the Eyüp Sultan Mosque contains the graves of several of his children from an early marriage from an unrecorded mother, including:

- Sokolluzâde Hasan Paşa — already a sanjak-bey of the Bosnia Eyalet in 1571, died 1604 (no birth year).
- Kurd Bey. Participated to the Siege of Szigetvár (1566) as an officer with his brother Sokolluzâde Hasan Paşa. Died c. 1572 – c. 1574.

On 17 August 1562, Sokollu Mehmed Pasha married Ismihan Sultan, daughter of future Sultan Selim II and Nurbanu Sultan and granddaughter of Sultan Süleyman I and Haseki Hürrem Sultan.

Only two of Sokollu's nine children from Ismihan would survive after infancy.

Sokollu's royal wife, Ismihan Sultan had given birth to nine children, six of whom had died one after another in infancy before 1574 from "falling sickness" when the couple finally abandoned their residence at Kadırgalimanı, adjacent to their co-endowed mosque complex as reported by Gerlach in his 1576 report:

- Sultanzade Ahmed Bey (1564 – 1567). Died in infancy, probably of smallpox.
- Sultanzade Piri Mehmed Bey (1566 – 1567). Died in early infancy, probably of smallpox.
- four other unknown children, most probably sons who died in infancy before 1574.

Antonio Tiepolo’s (1576) report states that they had three surviving infants, two daughters and one son who were born after their move to a newly-built palace closer to the Hippodrome from the previous residence which they deemed "haunted by evil spirits causing the deaths of their children one by one":

- Safiye Hanımsultan (1563 – 24 January 1594): Ismihan's only surviving daughter. She was firstly married to her father's cousin Sokollu Mustafa Pasha, governor of Buda. After his execution in 1578, she married the new governor of Buda, Silahdar Cafer Pasha. After his death in 1587, she gave birth to their twin sons, Mehmed Bey and Cafer Bey, who died as children. She married thirdly to Sultanzade Abdülbaki Bey, son of her mother's cousin Hümaşah Sultan. She died widowed on 24 January 1593.
- Unknown daughter (1574/5 – after 1576): She died after Antonio Tiepolo’s (1576) report as Safiye would be Ismihan's only surviving daughter.
- Sultanzade Sokolluzâde Ibrahim Han Pasha (1565 – 1621). Ismihan's only surviving son. In 1924, one of his descendants, Sokolluzade Abdülbâki Ihsân Bey, married another Ottoman princess, Rukiye Sultan, granddaughter of Sultan Mehmed V.

== Personal life ==
Mehmed spent the following years in peace, governing and administrating the realm. Mehmed's nephew, Sokollu Mustafa Pasha, was also a prominent politician, was sanjakbey of Bosnia and later the longest-serving governor of Budin Eyalet. It is said that Sokollu learned many lessons and refined his expansionist strategies under the influence of Seydi Reis. One of the most important pieces of knowledge that was passed on to Sokollu was that the Ottoman Empire was an all-time high across the region.

== See also ==
- Sokollu Mehmed Pasha Mosque
- List of Serbs

== Sources ==
- The Sokollu Family Clan and the Politics of Vizierial Households in the Second Half of Sixteenth Century by Uros Dakic, Central European University, Budapest, 2012 Archived 2020-08-28 at the Wayback Machine
- Giancarlo Casale (2010). The Ottoman Age of Exploration: Sokollu Mehmed Pasha and the Apogee of Empire 1561-1579. Oxford University Press. ISBN 978-0199798797.
- Jerry Brotton (2016). The Sultan and the Queen:The Untold Story of Elizabeth and Islam. Viking. ISBN 978-0525428824.
- A Forgetten Bridgehead between Rome, Venice, and the Ottoman Empire: Cattaro and the Balkan Missions in the Sixteenth and Seventeenth Centuries by Antal Molnár, 2014
- Tezcan, Baki (2010). The Second Ottoman Empire: Political and Social Transformation in the Early Modern World. Cambridge: Cambridge University Press. ISBN 978-0521519496.
- Crowley, Roger (2009). Empires of the Sea: The Final Battle for the Mediterranean, 1521-1580. London: Faber & Faber. ISBN 9780571250806.
- Finkel, Caroline (19 July 2012). Osman's Dream. John Murray Press. ISBN 978-1-84854-785-8.
- Fotić, Aleksandar (2009). "Serbian Orthodox Church". Encyclopedia of the Ottoman Empire. New York: Infobase Publishing. pp. 519–520. ISBN 978-1-4381-1025-7.
- Freely, John (2016). Inside the Seraglio: private lives of the sultans in Istanbul. London, New York City: Tauris Parke Paperbacks. ISBN 9781784535353.
- Hastings, Adrian (1997). The Construction of Nationhood: Ethnicity, Religion and Nationalism. Cambridge: Cambridge University Press. ISBN 978-0-52162-544-9.
- Imber, Colin (2009). The Ottoman Empire, 1300-1650: The Structure of Power (2nd ed.). New York: Palgrave Macmillan. ISBN 978-1137014061.
- Judah, Tim (2009) [1997]. The Serbs: History, Myth, and the Destruction of Yugoslavia (3rd ed.). New Haven and London: Yale University Press. ISBN 978-0-300-07113-9.
- Malcolm, Noel (1994). Bosnia: A Short History (1st ed.). New York: New York University Press. ISBN 978-0-8147-5520-4.
- Necipoğlu, Gülru (Brill): The Mangalia Mosque in the Waqf Empire of an Ottoman Power Couple- Princess İsmihan Sultan and Sokollu Mehmed Pasha.
- Sicker, Martin (2001). The Islamic World in Decline: From the Treaty of Karlowitz to the Disintegration of the Ottoman Empire. Greenwood Publishing Group. ISBN 027596891X.
- Sotirović, Vladislav B. (2011). "The Serbian Patriarchate of Peć in the Ottoman Empire: The First Phase (1557–94)". Serbian Studies: Journal of the North American Society for Serbian Studies. 25 (2): 143–169. doi:10.1353/ser.2011.0038.
- Tarim, Zeynep (2019). "Sigetvarname: A Visual Source of Sultan Süleyman's Last Campaign". The Battle for Central Europe: The Siege of Szigetvár and the Death of Süleyman the Magnificent and Nicholas Zrínyi (1566). Leiden; Boston : Budapest: BRILL; HAS, Research Centre for the Humanities. ISBN 9789004396234.
- Zararsiz, Abdullah (30 June 2021). "Osmanlı Kroniklerinde Sokollu Mehmed Paşa ve Sokoloviç Ailesi". Mediterranean Journal of Humanities (10). doi:10.13114/MJH.2021.568.

== Bibliography ==
- Samardžić, Radovan (1982). Mehmed Sokolović. Narodna Knjiga.

Political offices
Preceded by Semiz Ali Pasha	Grand Vizier of the Ottoman Empire; 28 June 1565 – 11 October 1579	Succeeded by Semiz Ahmed Pasha
Other offices
Preceded by ?	Beylerbey of Rumelia; 1551 – 1555	Succeeded by Pertev Pasha
