= Sokolac (disambiguation) =

Sokolac, Bosnia and Herzegovina is a municipality of the city of Istočno Sarajevo, Republika Srpska.

Sokolac may also refer to any of the following places:

- Sokolac (fortress near Brinje), a medieval fortification near Brinje, Croatia
- Sokolac (fortress near Bihać), a medieval fortification near Bihać, Bosnia and Herzegovina
- Sokolac (fortress near Sokobanja), a medieval fortification near Sokobanja, Serbia, best known as Soko Grad
- Sokolac (fortress near Jajce), a medieval fortification near Jajce, Bosnia and Herzegovina
- Sokolac, Montenegro, a village in Bijelo Polje Municipality
- Sokolac, Ljubovija, a village in the Ljubovija municipality, Mačva District, Central Serbia
- Sokolac, Šipovo, a village near Šipovo and Jajce in west-central Bosnia and Herzegovina
- Bački Sokolac, a village in the Bačka Topola municipality, North Bačka District, Vojvodina, Serbia
- Banatski Sokolac, a village in the Plandište municipality, South Banat District, Vojvodina, Serbia

== See also ==
- Sokolovići (disambiguation)
- Sokolović, a surname
- Sokolovo (disambiguation)
- Sokolov (disambiguation)
- Sokol (disambiguation)
- Soko (disambiguation)
