= Sokol =

Sokol, Sokół or SOKOL may refer to:

== Sports ==
=== Sokol movement ===
- Sokol movement, a Pan-Slavic physical education movement, and its various incarnations:
  - Czech Sokol movement, the original one
  - Sokół movement in Poland
  - Sokol movement in Yugoslavia
  - Slovenian Sokol movement
  - Ukrainian Sokol movement
  - Russian Sokol movement
  - Croatian Sokol movement
  - Serbian Sokol movement
  - Muslim Sokol movement
  - Sokol movement in the United States
  - Polish Falcons of America

=== Other sports clubs ===
==== Czech Republic ====
- DHC Sokol Poruba, a women's handball club in Ostrava
- Sokol Cholupice, a football club in Prague
- TJ Sokol Mariánské Hory, a rugby club in Ostrava
- TJ Sokol Ovčáry, a football club in Ovčáry
- TJ Sokol Protivanov, a football club in Protivanov
- TJ Sokol Tasovice, a football club in Tasovice
- TJ Sokol Živanice, a football club in Živanice

==== Other countries ====
- Sokol Krasnoyarsk, an ice hockey club in Russia
- Sokol Novocheboksarsk, an ice hockey club in Russia
- FC Sokol Saratov a football club in Russia
- TJ Sokol Dolná Ždaňa, a football club in Slovakia
- Sokół Nisko, a football club Poland
- Sokil Kyiv, also called Sokol Kiev, an ice hockey team in Ukraine

== Transport, technology and military ==
- Orličan L-40 Meta Sokol, a Czechoslovak sports and touring aircraft
- Sokol (camera), a Soviet photo camera brand
- ORP Sokół, name of three submarines of the Polish Navy
- PZL W-3 Sokół, a Polish helicopter
- Sokol design bureau, a Soviet aerospace company
- Sokol Eshelon, a Russian laser-based anti-satellite system
- Sokół motorcycles, a brand of motorcycles, produced in Poland before World War II
  - Sokół 1000, a Polish pre-war motorcycle
- Sokol space suit, used in the Soviet space program
- Sokol (train), a canceled high-speed Russian train project
- SS Sokol, a Yugoslav cargo ship

== People ==
- Sokol (given name), including a list of people with the name
- Sokol (surname), including a list of people with the name
- Sokół (rapper), Polish rapper

== Places ==
=== Russia ===
- Sokol District, a district in Northern Administrative Okrug of Moscow, Russia
- Sokol, Vologda Oblast, a town in Russia
- Sokol, Magadan Oblast, a town in Russia
- Sokol, Russia, index of inhabited localities in Russia
- Sokol (Moscow Metro), a station of the Moscow Metro

=== Central Europe ===
- Sokol (Lusatian Mountains), a peak in the Czech Republic
- Sokoľ, a municipality and village in Slovakia
- Sokół, Łódź Voivodeship, a village in central Poland
- Sokół, Masovian Voivodeship, a village in east-central Poland
- Sokół, Subcarpathian Voivodeship, a village in south-east Poland

=== Balkans ===
- Sokol (Konavle), a medieval fortified town in Croatia
- Sokol Fortress (Piva), a medieval fortified town in Montenegro
- Sokol or Sokograd (Pliva), a medieval fortified town in Bosnia and Herzegovina
- Sokol or Sokolac (fortress near Bihać), a fortress in Bosnia and Herzegovina
- Sokol or Soko Grad (Ljubovija), a medieval fortified town in Serbia

=== Other places ===
- Sokol International Racetrack, a racetrack in Kazakhstan
- Socol, Serbian: Sokol, a commune in Romania

=== Buildings in the United States ===
- D. J. Sokol Arena, a student recreational facility in Omaha, Nebraska
- Sokol Auditorium, a building in Omaha, Nebraska
- Sokol Blosser Winery, a vineyard, tasting room and winery near Dayton, Oregon

== Music ==
- Sokol (Soviet band), 1960s Soviet rock group

== See also ==
- Sokol Grad (disambiguation)
- Szokol (surname)
- Sokil (disambiguation)
- Sokal (disambiguation)
- Sokolac (disambiguation)
- Sokor
