= Lleshi =

Lleshi (pronounced [ɫɛʃi]) is an Albanian surname. Notable people with this name include:

- Arsen Lleshi (born 1999), Albanian footballer
- Bleri Lleshi (born 1981), Albanian philosopher, researcher and activist
- Ferdinand Lleshi, Albanian footballer
- Haxhi Lleshi (1913–1998), Albanian military leader and communist politician
- Ismail Lleshi (born 1947), Albanian politician
- Kleandro Lleshi (born 1999), Albanian footballer
- Mustafa Lleshi, Albanian anti-fascist
- Ravesa Lleshi (born 1976), Albanian Permanent Representative to the United Nations Office at Geneva
- Sandër Lleshaj (born 1963), Albanian politician
- Shefki Riza Lleshi (1912–2001), Albanian patriot
- Sokol Lleshi (born 1996), Albanian footballer
