= Sokal (disambiguation) =

Sokal is a city in Ukraine.

Sokal may also refer to:

- "Sokal" (song), a 2014 song by Nadezhda Misyakova
- Sokal (surname)
- Ukrainian Catholic Eparchy of Sokal, an eparchy of the Ukrainian Greek Catholic Church

== See also ==
- Sokol (disambiguation)
- Sokil (disambiguation)
