= Sokolovac =

Sokolovac may refer to:

- Sokolovac, Bjelovar-Bilogora County, village in the municipality of Dežanovac in Croatia
- Sokolovac, Koprivnica-Križevci County, village and municipality in Croatia
- Sokolovac, Osijek-Baranja County, village in the municipality of Kneževi Vinogradi in Croatia
- Socol, known in Serbo-Croatian as Sokolovac, in Romania

== See also ==
- Sokolovići (disambiguation)
- Sokolović, surname
- Sokolovo (disambiguation)
- Sokolov (disambiguation)
- Sokol (disambiguation)
- Sokol (disambiguation)
