= Sokolovići =

Sokolovići may refer to:

- Sokolovići, Rudo, Republika Srpska, Bosnia and Herzegovina
- Sokolovići, Sokolac, Republika Srpska, Bosnia and Herzegovina

== See also ==
- Sokolović, surname
- Sokolovac (disambiguation)
- Sokolovo (disambiguation)
- Sokolov (disambiguation)
- Sokol (disambiguation)
- Soko (disambiguation)
