= Sokolovo =

Sokolovo (Bulgarian, Russian and Serbian Cyrillic: Соколово) may refer to:

== Places ==
- Sokolovo, Serbia
- Sokolovo, Ukraine, village in Kharkiv Oblast, place of the Battle of Sokolovo
- Sokolovo, Burgas Province, Bulgaria
- Sokolovo, Dobrich Province, Bulgaria
- Sokolovo, Gabrovo Province, Bulgaria
- Sokolovo, Lovech Province, Bulgaria
- Donje Sokolovo, Bosnia and Herzegovina
- Gornje Sokolovo, Bosnia and Herzegovina
- Golyamo Sokolovo, Targovishte Municipality, Bulgaria

== In popular culture ==
- Sokolovo (film), 1974 Czechoslovak war film directed by Otakar Vávra, depicting the Battle of Sokolovo

== See also ==
- Sokołowo (disambiguation)
- Sokolov (disambiguation)
- Sokolović, a surname
- Sokolovići (disambiguation)
- Sokolovac (disambiguation)
- Sokol (disambiguation)
- Soko (disambiguation)
