= Death poem =

Genre of poetry

- "Death poem" in Traditional (top) and Simplified (bottom) Chinese characters

Chinese name
- Traditional Chinese: 絕命詩
- Simplified Chinese: 绝命诗
Transcriptions
Standard Mandarin
- Hanyu Pinyin: juémìngshī

Vietnamese name
- Vietnamese alphabet: thơ tuyệt mệnh
- Hán-Nôm: 詩絶命

Korean name
- Hangul: 절명시
- Hanja: 絕命詩
Transcriptions
- Revised Romanization: jeolmyeongsi

Japanese name
- Kanji: 辞世
- Kana: じせい
Transcriptions
- Romanization: jisei

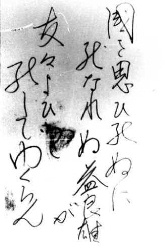
The jisei, or death poem, of Kuroki Hiroshi, a Japanese sailor who died in a Kaiten suicide torpedo accident on 7 September 1944. It reads: "This brave man, so filled with love for his country that he finds it difficult to die, is calling out to his friends and about to die".

The death poem is a genre of poetry that developed in the literary traditions of the Sinosphere—most prominently in Japan as well as certain periods of Chinese history, Joseon Korea, and Vietnam. They tend to offer a reflection on death—both in general and concerning the imminent death of the author—that is often coupled with a meaningful observation on life. The practice of writing a death poem has its origins in Zen Buddhism. It is a concept or worldview derived from the Buddhist teaching of the three marks of existence (三法印, sanbōin), specifically that the material world is transient and impermanent (無常, mujō), that attachment to it causes suffering (苦, ku), and ultimately all reality is an emptiness or absence of self-nature (空, kū). These poems became associated with the literate, spiritual, and ruling segments of society, as they were customarily composed by a poet, warrior, nobleman, or Buddhist monk.

The writing of a poem at the time of one's death and reflecting on the nature of death in an impermanent, transitory world is a tradition in East Asian cultures. It has close ties with Buddhism, and particularly the mystical Zen Buddhism (of Japan), Chan Buddhism (of China), Seon Buddhism (of Korea), and Thiền Buddhism (of Vietnam). From its inception, Buddhism has stressed the importance of death because awareness of death is what prompted the Buddha to perceive the ultimate futility of worldly concerns and pleasures. A death poem exemplifies the search for a new viewpoint, a new way of looking at life and things generally, or a version of enlightenment (satori in Japanese; wu in Chinese). According to comparative religion scholar Julia Ching, Japanese Buddhism "is so closely associated with the memory of the dead and the ancestral cult that the family shrines dedicated to the ancestors, and still occupying a place of honor in homes, are popularly called the Butsudan, literally 'the Buddhist altars'. It has been the custom in modern Japan to have Shinto weddings, but to turn to Buddhism in times of bereavement and for funeral services".

The writing of a death poem was limited to the society's literate class, ruling class, samurai, and monks. It was introduced to Western audiences during World War II when Japanese soldiers, emboldened by their culture's samurai legacy, would write poems before suicidal missions or battles.

== Chinese death poems ==
=== Song of Gaixia by Xiang Yu ===
According to the Shiji, this poem was composed by Xiang Yu, the self-styled "Hegemon-King" in 202 BCE. He was surrounded by Liu Bang's Han forces at Gaixia.

=== Yuan Chonghuan ===
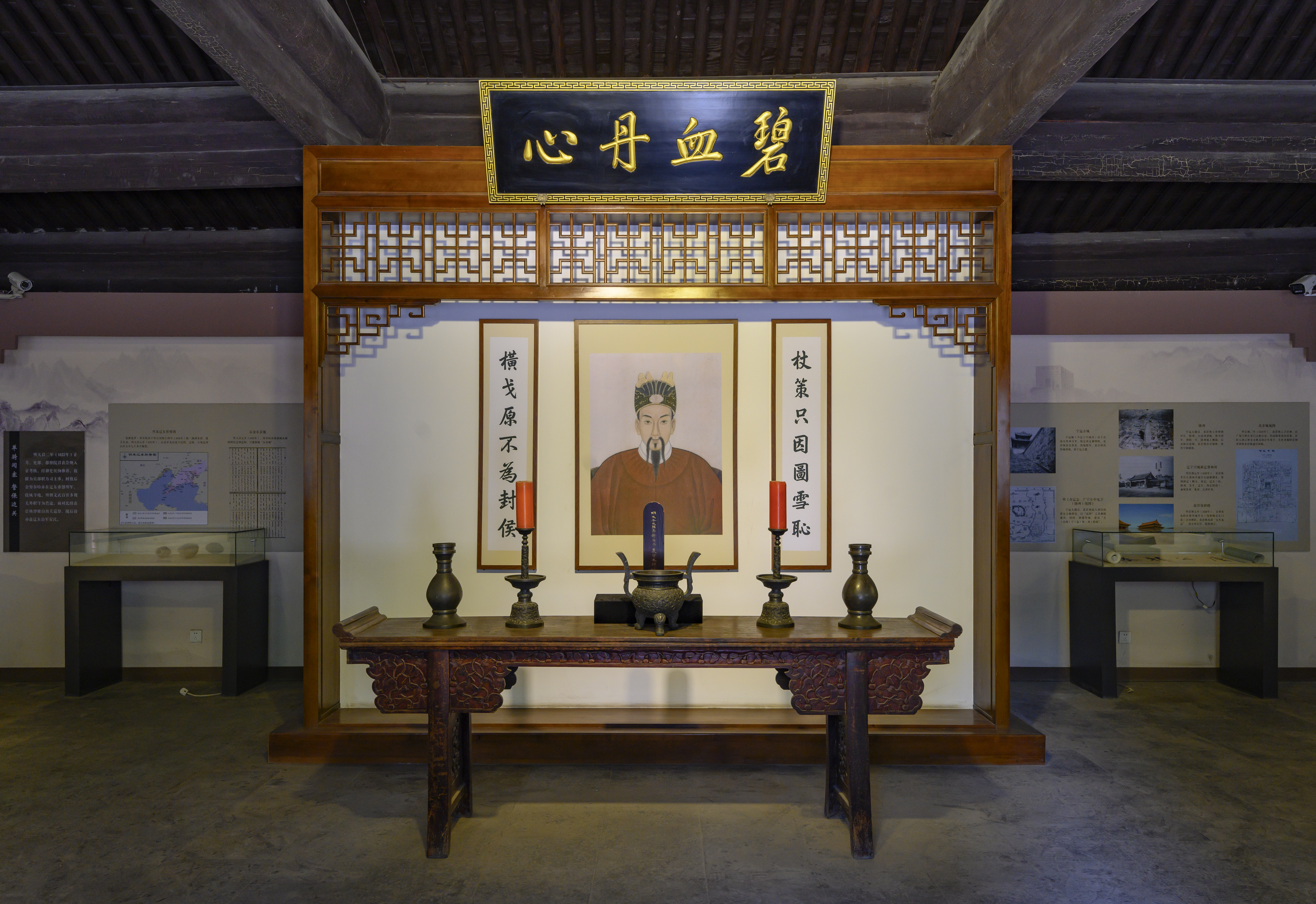
Memorial of Yuan Chonghuan, Dongcheng District, Beijing

Yuan Chonghuan (袁崇煥, 1584–1630) was a politician and military general who served under the Ming dynasty. He is best known for defending Liaodong from Jurchen invaders during the Later Jin invasion of the Ming. Yuan met his end when he was arrested and executed by lingchi ("slow slicing") on the order of the Chongzhen Emperor under false charges of treason, which were believed to have been planted against him by the Jurchens. Before his execution, he produced the following poem.

一生事業總成空
半世功名在夢中
死後不愁無勇將
忠魂依舊守遼東

A life's work totals to nothing
Half of my career seems to be in dreams
I do not worry about lacking brave warriors after my death
For my loyal spirit will continue to guard Liaodong

=== Xia Wanchun ===
Xia Wanchun (夏完淳, 1631–1647) was a Ming dynasty poet and soldier. He is famous for resisting the Manchu invaders and died aged 17. He wrote the poem before his death.

三年羈旅客
今日又南冠
無限山河淚
誰言天地寬
已知泉路近
欲別故鄉難
毅魄歸來日
靈旗空際看

I have been on the path of the war for three years
And now I became the prison of the war
Tears are everywhere in the mount and river
Who will say the heaven is wide
I know my death is close
And hard to farewell my homeland
On the day of my soul coming back
I hope I can see the Manchu troops is defeated

=== Zheng Ting ===
Zheng Ting (郑颋; died 621) was a politician in the end of the Sui dynasty. He was executed by Wang Shichong after trying to resign from his official position under Wang and become a Buddhist monk. He faced the execution without fear and wrote this death poem, which reflected his strong Buddhist belief.

幻生還幻滅
大幻莫過身
安心自有處
求人無有人

Illusion appears, illusion ceases
The biggest illusion among all is our body
Once a pacified heart finds its place
There's no such body to look for

=== Yang Jisheng ===
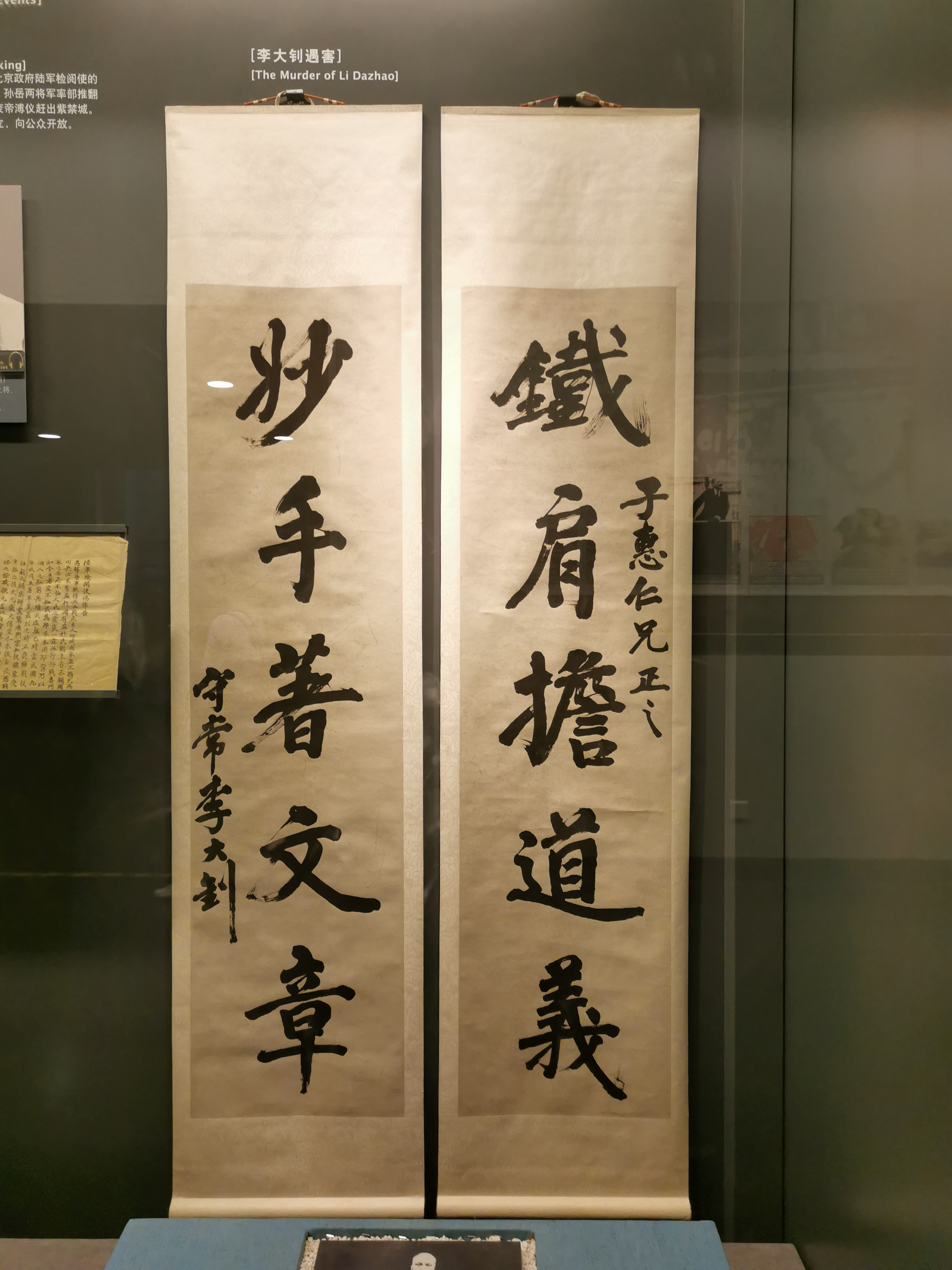
The death poem of Li Dazhao, adapted from Yang Jisheng

Yang Jisheng (楊繼盛; 1516 – 1555) was a Chinese court official of the Ming dynasty who held multiple posts during the reign of the Jiajing Emperor. He was executed because of his stand against political opponent Yan Song. The evening before his execution, Yang Jisheng wrote a poem which was preserved on monuments and in later accounts of his life. It reads:

鐵肩擔道義
辣手著文章
Bear righteousness and the way on a shoulder of iron,
Write with a peppery hand.

=== Wen Tianxiang ===
Wen Tianxiang (文天祥; 1236–1283) was a Chinese poet and politician in the last years of the Southern Song dynasty. He was executed by Kublai Khan for the uprisings against Yuan dynasty.

孔曰成仁
孟曰取義
惟其義盡
所以仁至
讀聖賢書
所學何事
而今而後
庻幾無愧

Confucius speaks of perfecting nobility
Mencius speaks of choosing duty
It is only by fulfilling duty to the upmost
That one obtains nobility
What does one learn
Studying the classics of the Sages
From this point on
I can perhaps be free from shame

=== Tan Sitong ===
Tan Sitong (譚嗣同; March 10, 1865 – September 28, 1898) was a well-known Chinese politician, thinker, and reformist in the late Qing dynasty (1644–1911). He was executed at the age of 33 when the Hundred Days' Reform failed in 1898. Tan Sitong was one of the six gentlemen of the Hundred Days' Reform, and occupies an important place in modern Chinese history.

望門投止思張儉
忍死須臾待杜根
我自橫刀向天笑
去留肝膽兩崑崙

Should I run and hide in my friend's home? On Zhang Jian muse I.
Till death I long for myr'ad Du Gen's to rise and loudly cry.
Let the sword fall on my neck, I am laughing at the sky –
I leave my Loyalty and Justice, twin-Kunluns, behind!

=== Wang Jingwei ===
Wang Jingwei was a Chinese politician and early revolutionary. He was once seen as a heroic anti-Qing activist. 《被逮口占》("Verses Composed on Being Arrested") was written in 1910 after Wang was arrested for plotting to assassinate Prince Chun. But his sentence was reduced to life imprisonment. After the 1911 Revolution overthrew the Qing dynasty, Wang was released.

== Japanese death poems ==
=== Style and technique ===
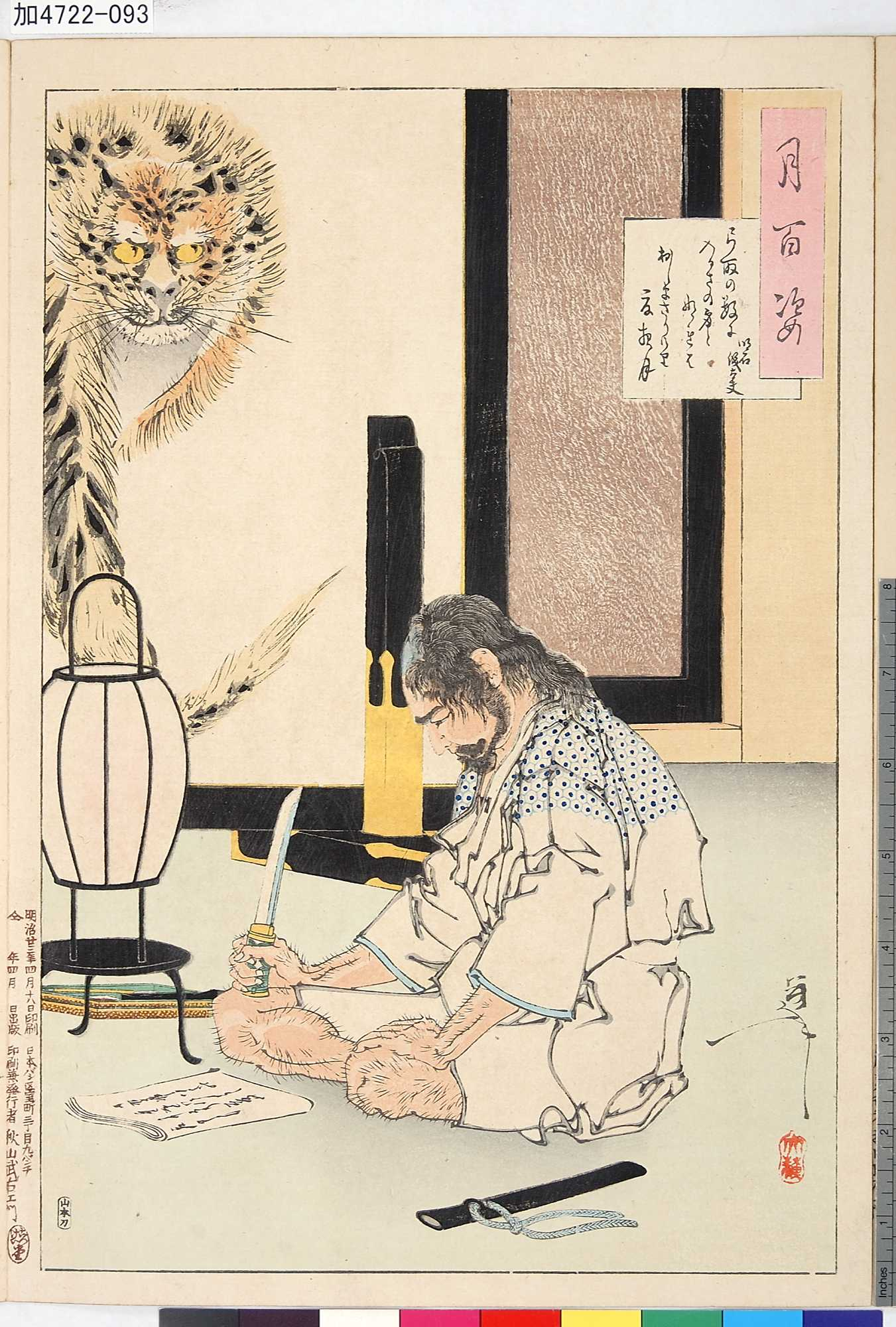
Print by Tsukioka Yoshitoshi depicting General Akashi Gidayu preparing for seppuku after losing a battle for his master in 1582. His death poem is visible in the upper right corner.

The poem's structure can be in one of many forms, including the two traditional forms in Japanese literature: kanshi or waka. (Note: "Kanshi" is a Chinese-style poem written in Chinese characters by a Japanese poet; while waka, which literally means "Japanese poem", is written in lines alternating between 5 and 7 syllables) Sometimes they are written in the three-line, seventeen-syllable haiku form, although the most common type of death poem (called a jisei 辞世) is in the waka form called the tanka (also called a jisei-ei 辞世詠) which consists of five lines totaling 31 syllables (5-7-5-7-7)—a form that constitutes over half of surviving death poems (Ogiu, 317–318).

Poetry has long been a core part of Japanese tradition. Death poems are typically graceful, natural, and emotionally neutral, in accordance with the teachings of Buddhism and Shinto. Excepting the earliest works of this tradition, it has been considered inappropriate to mention death explicitly; rather, metaphorical references such as sunsets, autumn or falling cherry blossom suggest the transience of life.

It was an ancient custom in Japan for literate persons to compose a jisei on their deathbed. One of the earliest was recited by Prince Ōtsu, executed in 686. More examples of jisei are those of the famous haiku poet Bashō, the Japanese Buddhist monk Ryōkan, Edo Castle builder Ōta Dōkan, the monk Gesshū Sōko, and the woodblock master Tsukioka Yoshitoshi. The custom has continued into modern Japan. Some people left their death poems in multiple forms: Prince Ōtsu made both waka and kanshi, and Sen no Rikyū made both kanshi and kyōka.

来時は空手、去時は赤脚。一去一来、単重交折

Raiji wa karate kyoji wa sekkyaku ikkyoichirai tanjuu sekkou

Empty-handed I entered the world
Barefoot I leave it.
My coming, my going —
Two simple happenings
That got entangled.

— Zen monk Kozan Ichikyo (1283–1360)

Fujiwara no Teishi, the first empress of Emperor Ichijo, was also known as a poet. Before her death in childbirth in 1001, she wrote three waka to express her sorrow and love to her servant, Sei Shōnagon, and the emperor. Teishi said that she would be entombed, rather than be cremated, so that she wrote that she will not become dust or cloud. The first one was selected into the poem collection Ogura Hyakunin Isshu.

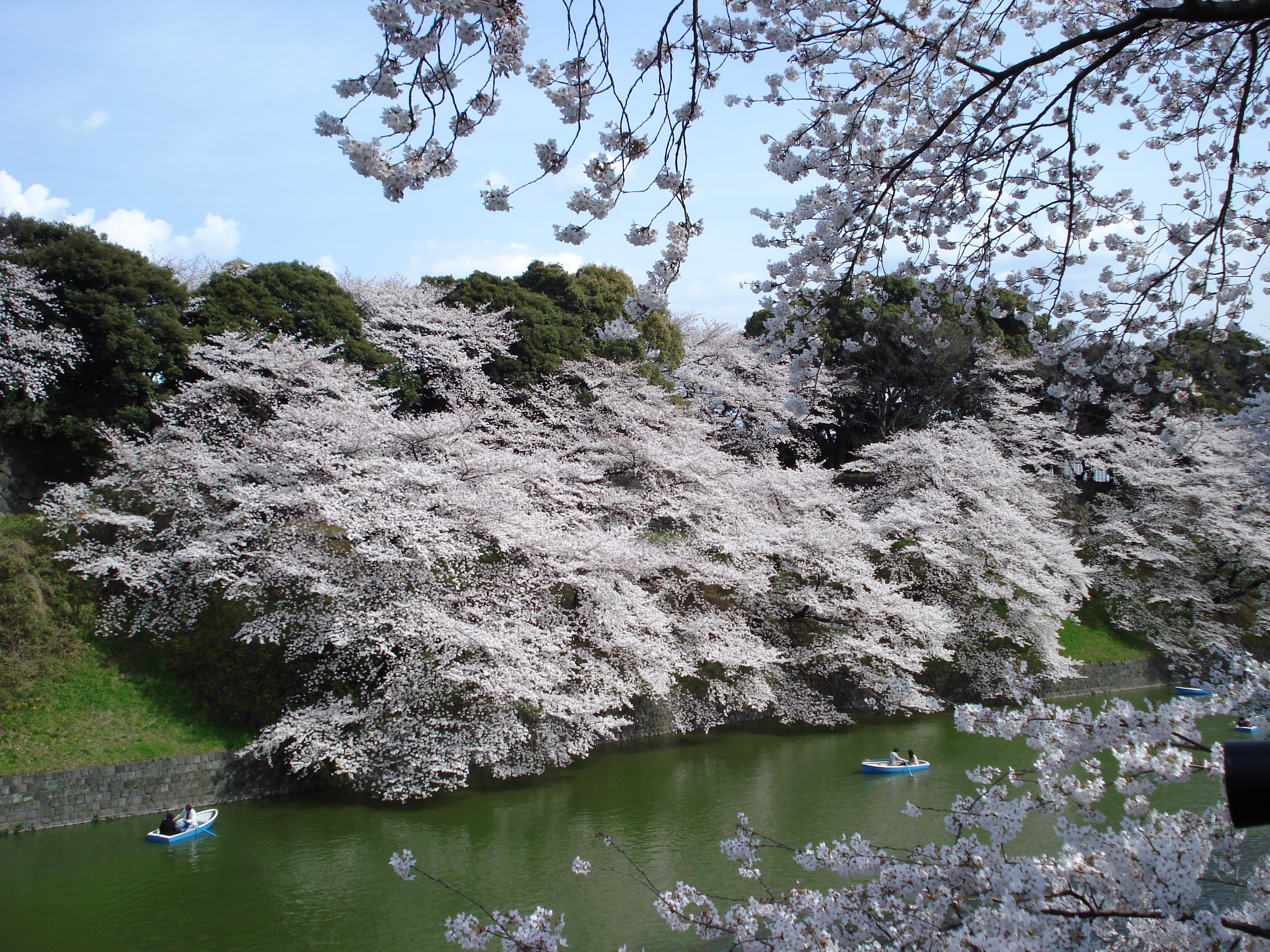
Cherry blossoms at the Tokyo Imperial Palace

夜もすがら 契りし事を 忘れずは こひむ涙の 色ぞゆかしき
知る人も なき别れ路に 今はとて 心ぼそくも 急ぎたつかな
烟とも 雲ともならぬ 身なれども 草葉の露を それとながめよ

yo mosu gara / chigirishi koto o / wasurezu wa/ kohimu namida no/ irozo yukashiki
shiru hito mo/naki wakare chi ni / ima wa tote / kokoro bosoku mo / isogi tasu kana
kemuri tomo / kumo tomo naranu / mi nare domo / kusaba no tsuyu wo / sore to nagame yo

All through the night we sealed a secret vow,
If you recall it still, my tears won’t cease;
The color of my longing haunts me now,
Binding my soul in sorrow without peace.

I leave this road, unseen by friend or kin,
No kindly hand to guide these trembling feet;
My fragile heart, a withered leaf within,
Treads toward that dusky realm in lone retreat.

Though urged to hasten far beyond this shore,
My mind is frail, and tears outlast the day;
If not to vanish, smoke or cloud, once more,
Gaze on the dew that glistens where I lay.

Yet what we vowed endures all grief and pain;
A bond of hearts no fate could e’er unchain.

—— Translation adapted to Shakespearean Sonnet form

On March 17, 1945, General Tadamichi Kuribayashi, the Japanese commander-in chief during the Battle of Iwo Jima, sent a final letter to Imperial Headquarters. In the message, General Kuribayashi apologized for failing to successfully defend Iwo Jima against the overwhelming forces of the United States military. At the same time, however, he expressed great pride in the heroism of his men, who, starving and thirsty, had been reduced to fighting with rifle butts and fists. He closed the message with three traditional death poems in waka form.

国の為 重き努を 果し得で 矢弾尽き果て 散るぞ悲しき
仇討たで 野辺には朽ちじ 吾は又 七度生れて 矛を執らむぞ
醜草の 島に蔓る 其の時の 皇国の行手 一途に思ふ

Kuni no tame / omoki tsutome o / hatashi ede / yadama tsukihate / chiruzo kanashiki
Ada utade / nobe niwa kuchiji / warewa mata / shichido umarete / hoko o toranzo
Shikokusa no / shima ni habikoru / sono toki no / Mikuni no yukute / ichizu ni omou

Unable to complete this heavy task for our country
Arrows and bullets all spent, so sad we fall.
But unless I smite the enemy,
My body cannot rot in the field.
Yet, I shall be born again seven times
And grasp the sword in my hand.
When ugly weeds cover this island,
My sole thought shall be [the future of] the Imperial Land.

In 1970, writer Yukio Mishima and his disciple Masakatsu Morita composed death poems before their attempted coup at the Ichigaya garrison in Tokyo, where they committed seppuku. Mishima wrote:

散るをいとふ
世にも人にも
さきがけて
散るこそ花と
吹く小夜嵐

Chiru o itofu
Yo ni mo hito ni mo
Sakigakete
Chiru koso hana to
Fuku sayoarashi

A small night storm blows
Saying 'falling is the essence of a flower'
Preceding those who hesitate

Although he did not compose any formal death poem on his deathbed, the last poem written by Bashō (1644–1694), recorded by his disciple Takarai Kikaku during his final illness, is generally accepted as his poem of farewell:

旅に病んで
夢は枯れ野を
かけめぐる

Tabi ni yande
yume wa kareno o
kakemeguru

Falling ill on a journey
my dreams go wandering
over withered fields

Despite the seriousness of the subject matter, some Japanese poets have employed levity or irony in their final compositions. The Zen monk Tokō (杜口; 1710–1795) commented on the pretentiousness of some jisei in his own death poem:

辞世とは
即ちまよひ
たゞ死なん

Jisei to wa
sunawachi mayoi
tada shinan

Death poems
are mere delusion –
death is death.

This poem by Moriya Sen'an (d. 1838) showed an expectation of an entertaining afterlife:

我死なば
酒屋の瓶の
下にいけよ
もしや雫の
もりやせんなん

Ware shinaba
sakaya no kame no
shita ni ikeyo
moshi ya shizuku no
mori ya sen nan

Bury me when I die
beneath a wine barrel
in a tavern.
With luck
the cask will leak.

The final line, "hopefully the cask will leak" (mori ya sen nan), is a play on the poet's name, Moriya Sen'an.

Written over a large calligraphic character 死 shi, meaning Death, the Japanese Zen master Hakuin Ekaku (白隠 慧鶴; 1685–1768) wrote as his jisei:

若い衆や死ぬがいやなら今死にやれ
一たび死ねばもう死なぬぞや

Wakaishu ya
shinu ga iya nara
ima shiniyare
hito-tabi shineba
mō shinanu zo ya

Oh young folk –
if you fear death,
die now!
Having died once
you won't die again.

== Korean death poems ==
In Korean history, Confucian scholars called seonbis seldom wrote death poems (절명시 jeol myeong si) alongside Buddhist Monks. However, most popular examples are those written or recited by famous historical figures facing execution for treason or betrayal. They are therefore impromptu verses, often declaring their loyalty or steadfastness. The following are some examples that are taught to school children in Korea. The examples are written in Korean sijo (three lines of 3-4-3-4 or its variation) or in Hanja five-syllable format (5-5-5-5 for a total of 20 syllables) of ancient Chinese poetry (五言詩).

=== Yi Kae ===
Yi Kae (이개; 1417–1456) was one of "six martyred ministers" who were executed for conspiring to assassinate King Sejo, who usurped the throne from his nephew Danjong. Sejo offered to pardon six ministers including Yi Kae and Sŏng Sammun if they would repent their crime and accept his legitimacy, but Yi Kae and all others refused. He recited the following poem in his cell prior to his execution on June 8, 1456. In the following sijo, the word "Lord" (임 im) refers to someone beloved or cherished, which is King Danjong in this instance.

방(房) 안에 혓는 촉(燭) 불 눌과 이별(離別)하엿관대
것츠로 눈믈 디고 속 타는 쥴 모르는고.
뎌 촉(燭) 불 날과 갓트여 속 타는 쥴 모로도다.

Oh, candlelight illuminating the room, whom have you parted from?
You shed tears without and burn within, yet no one notices.
We part with our Lord on a long journey and burn like thee.

=== Sŏng Sammun ===
Like Yi Kae, Sŏng Sammun (1418–1456) was one of "six martyred ministers", and was the leader of the conspiracy to assassinate Sejo. He refused the offer of pardon and did not recognise Sejo's legitimacy. He recited the following sijo in captivity and the second (five-syllable poem) on his way to the place of execution, where his limbs were tied to oxen and torn apart.

이 몸이 죽어 가서 무어시 될고 하니,
봉래산(蓬萊山) 제일봉(第一峯)에 낙락장송(落落長松) 되야 이셔,
백설(白雪)이 만건곤(滿乾坤)할 제 독야청청(獨也靑靑) 하리라.

What shall I become when this body is dead and gone?
A tall, thick pine tree on the highest peak of Mount Penglai,
Evergreen alone when white snow covers the whole world.

擊鼓催人命 (격고최인명) -둥둥 북소리는 내 생명을 재촉하고,
回頭日欲斜 (회두일욕사) -머리를 돌여 보니 해는 서산으로 넘어 가려고 하는구나
黃泉無客店 (황천무객점) -황천으로 가는 길에는 주막조차 없다는데,
今夜宿誰家 (금야숙수가) -오늘밤은 뉘 집에서 잠을 자고 갈거나

As the beating of drum urges my life,
I turn my head to see that the sun is passing over the hills in the West.
There are not even inns on the path to the underworld.
At whose house shall I sleep tonight before I pass?

=== Cho Kwangjo ===
Cho Kwangjo (1482–1519) was a neo-Confucian reformist who was framed by the conservative faction opposing his reforms in the Third Literati Purge of 1519. His political enemies accused Jo of being disloyal by writing "Cho shall become King" (주초위왕 走肖爲王, Chu ch'o wi wang) with honey on top of leaves so that caterpillars would leave behind the same phrase as if caused by a supernatural manifestation. King Jungjong ordered his death by poison and ceased Jo's reform measures. Jo, who had believed to the end that Jungjong would realize his mistakes, wrote the following before drinking poison on December 20, 1519. Repetition of similar words were used to emphasize strong conviction in this five-syllable poem.

愛君如愛父 (애군여애부) -임금 사랑하기를 아버지 사랑하듯 하였고
憂國如憂家 (우국여우가) -나라 걱정하기를 집안 근심처럼 하였다
白日臨下土 (백일임하토) -밝은 해 아래 세상을 굽어보사
昭昭照丹衷 (소소조단충) -내 단심과 충정 밝디 밝게 비춰주소서

I loved the king as if he were my father
Worried over the country as if it were my house
See the world under the bright sun looking down upon the world
May it shine ever so brightly as my red and loyal heart.

=== Chŏng Mong-ju ===
Chŏng Mong-ju (정몽주; 1337–1392) was an influential high minister of the Goryeo dynasty when Yi Sŏng-gye sought to overthrow it and establish a new dynasty. When Yi Pang-wŏn, the son of Yi Sŏng-gye, requested Chŏng to support the founding of a new dynasty through a poem, Chŏng responded with a poem of his own reaffirming his loyalty to the falling Goryeo dynasty. Just as he had suspected, he was assassinated on the same night on April 4, 1392. Chŏng's death poem is one of the most famous poems Korean history. Chŏng’s death poem survives in several forms: The script first written in Classical Chinese (the scholarly language of the time), another after being transcribed into hangul, and finally a version rendered in a modernized hangul version for eased comprehension.

此身死了死了
一百番更死了
白骨爲塵土
魂魄有也無
向主一片丹心
寧有改理也歟

차신사료사료
일백번갱사료
백골위진토
혼백유야무
향주일편단심
영유개리야여

이몸이주거주거
일백번고쳐주거
白骨이塵土되여
넉시라도잇고업고
님향한一片丹心이야
가쉴줄이이시랴

Should this body die and die again a hundred times over,
With its white bones turning to dust, with or without a trace of its soul,
With my loyal, steadfast heart towards my Lord, red to its core, could it ever cease?

=== Hwang Hyun ===
Hwang Hyun (or Hyeon) (황현; 1855–1910) was a Korean independence activist in the early 20th century. His art name was Maecheon (매천; 梅泉), and he was the author of the Maecheon Yarok (매천야록; 梅泉野錄), his diary of six volumes written from 1864 to 1910. Its detailed record of Korean historical events of the late 19th century makes it a notable primary source in research and education about the late Joseon dynasty and Korean Empire. For example, it was and is referenced in modern textbooks. He displayed great respect to other Korean independence activists, writing poems of mourning for the activists who had committed suicide after the signing of the Eulsa Treaty of 1905. However, in 1910, he himself would commit suicide after the annexation of Korea. He left behind four death poems, with the third one being the most well-known in the modern day.

鳥獸哀鳴海嶽嚬
槿花世界已沈淪
秋燈掩卷懷千古
難作人間識字人

새 짐승도 슬피 울고 산과 바다도 찌푸리네.
무궁화 삼천리는 이미 물속에 잠겼구나.
가을 밤 등불아래 책을 덮고서 옛일 곰곰이 생각해 보니,
인간 세상에서 지식인 노릇하기가 참으로 어렵구나.

Birds and beasts cry in sorrow and even the mountains and seas frown
The three thousand li of hibiscuses have already sunken underwater
As I close the book under lamplight and reminisce the past on an autumn night,
(It seems that) It is so arduous to be an intellectual in a world of humans.

== Vietnamese death poems ==
In Vietnam, death poems are referred to as thơ tuyệt mệnh (chữ Hán: 詩絶命). These poems were commonly written in the Thất ngôn tứ tuyệt (七言四絶) form following Tang dynasty poetic form. This genre of poems were especially significant during the French conquest of Vietnam. The poems can be either written in Hán văn (漢文; Literary Chinese) or Vietnamese written in chữ Nôm (𡨸喃).

=== Hồ Huân Nghiệp ===
Hồ Huân Nghiệp (胡勳業; 1829–1864) was an influential scholar during the Nguyễn dynasty. He was also well known for being one of the first to fight against the French. The French eventually captured him in Gia Định (嘉定; present-day Ho Chi Minh City). Before he was executed by the French, he washed his face, fixed his turban, and recited four verses of poetry before being beheaded.

見義寧甘不勇為、
全憑忠孝作男兒。
此身生死何修後、
惟戀高堂白髮時。

Kiến nghĩa ninh cam bất dũng vi,
Toàn bằng trung hiếu tác nam nhi.
Thử thân sinh tử hà tu hậu,
Duy luyến cao đường bạch phát thì.

Thấy nghĩa lòng đâu dám hững hờ
Làm trai trung hiếu quyết tôn thờ
Thân này sống chết khôn màng nhắc
Thương bấy mẹ già tóc bạc phơ

Seeing righteousness, how could one not bravely act?
Relying on loyalty and filial piety to be a true man.
Life and death, what does it matter after cultivating virtue?
Only longing for the time when parents’ hair turns white.

=== Hoàng Phan Thái ===
Hoàng Phan Thái (黄潘泰; 1819–1865) was a reformist and revolutionary during the reign of Emperor Tự Đức (嗣德帝). Advocating for the modernization of Vietnam, he proposed the creation of a new political party to implement reforms and challenge the stagnation of the Nguyễn dynasty. To rally support for his cause, he adopted the title Grand General of the Eastern Sea (東海大將軍; Đông Hải Đại Tướng Quân). In collaboration with Lê Duy Uẩn (黎維蘊) and Nguyễn Thịnh (阮盛), Hoàng Phan Thái sought to overthrow Tự Đức's regime through a military uprising and to resist the French colonialists. Their strategy involved leveraging coastal forces and rallying support in the Nghệ Tĩnh region, with plans to weaken the Nguyễn dynasty's central power. Despite their efforts, the uprising ultimately failed, and Hoàng Phan Thái was captured and executed for his revolutionary activities. Before his death, he wrote a death poem.

𠀧回𪔠𠽖屍吒刼、
沒𤁕鎌迻𠴼媄代。
𤯩𫜵將孟𠀧方坦、
托𫴋神𤍌𦊚𱘃𡗶。

Ba hồi trống giục thây cha kiếp,
Một lát gươm đưa đéo mẹ đời!
Sống làm tướng mạnh ba phương đất,
Thác xuống thần thiêng bốn phía trời.

Three drumbeats urge the body of a father’s fate,
A moment later, the sword guides the mother’s life!
Live as a general, strong in the three directions of the land,
Die as a sacred spirit, encompassing the four corners of the sky.

=== Lưu Thường ===
Lưu Thường (劉常; 1345–1388) was a Vietnamese official of the Trần dynasty. He is most notably remembered for his involvement in a failed plot to rescue Trần Phế Đế (陳廢帝). In 1388, Hồ Quý Ly (胡季犛), a powerful and ambitious official, manipulated the retired emperor, Trần Nghệ Tông (陳藝宗) into forcing Trần Phế Đế to commit suicide by hanging. Lưu Thường, along with Nguyễn Khoái (阮快) and Nguyễn Vân Nhi (阮雲兒), planned to save Trần Phế Đế, but their efforts were discovered, and all participants in the plot were executed. Before his death, Lưu Thường wrote a famous death poem that reflected his unwavering loyalty and sense of righteousness. His death poem is found in the eighth volume (卷之八) of Đại Việt sử ký toàn thư.

殘年四十有餘三、
忠義逢誅死正甘。
抱義生前應不負、
暴屍原上又何暫。

Tàn niên tứ thập hữu dư tam,
Trung nghĩa phùng tru tử chính cam.
Bão nghĩa sinh tiền ưng bất phụ,
Bộc thi nguyên thượng hựu hà tạm!

Bốn mươi ba tuổi thân tàn tạ,
Trung nghĩa, sa cơ chết cũng đành.
Giữ tiết bình sinh lòng chẳng phụ,
Phơi thây ngoài nội hẳn không kinh!

In my remaining years, more than forty-three,
Loyal and righteous, I gladly face death.
Upholding justice, I have no regrets in life,
What harm is there in my body lying exposed on the plains!

=== Nguyễn Sư Phó ===
Nguyễn Sư Phó (阮瑡傅; 1458–1519) was a Vietnamese court official of the Lê dynasty. He was well known for installing Lê Bảng (黎榜) as the new emperor (Đại Đức; 大德) after a series of rebellions and unrest. Around March 1519, Trịnh Tuy (鄭綏) deposed Lê Bảng and installed Bảng's younger brother, Lê Do (黎槱), as emperor, changing the era name to Thiên Hiến (天憲). In July 1519, during a heavy rainstorm, Lê Chiêu Tông's general, Mạc Đăng Dung (莫登庸), led both naval and land forces to besiege Emperor Thiên Hiến at Từ Liêm. Nguyễn Sư Phó fled to Ninh Sơn but were captured by Lê Chiêu Tông's forces and taken prisoner. Before Nguyễn Sư Phó was executed, he wrote a death poem. His death poem is found in the fifteenth volume (卷之十五) of Đại Việt sử ký toàn thư.

本慾興周救萬民、
誰知天意不隨人。
烏江水闊難東渡、
赤壁風高易北焚。
雲暗寧山龍去遠、
月明福地鶴來頻。
英雄成敗古來有、
但恨平生志未伸。

Bản dục hưng Chu cứu vạn dân,
Thuỳ tri thiên ý bất tuỳ nhân.
Ô giang thuỷ khoát nan đông độ
Xích Bích phong cao dị bắc phần.
Vân ám Ninh Sơn long khứ viễn,
Nguyệt minh phúc địa hạc lai tần.
Anh hùng thành bại cổ lai hữu,
Đãn hận bình sinh chí vị thân.

Những toan phục nước cứu muôn dân
Trời chẳng chiều người cũng khó phần
Sông rộng, Giang Đông khôn trở gót
Gió to, Xích Bích dễ thiêu quân
Ninh Sơn mây ám rồng xa khuất
Phúc địa trăng soi hạc tới gần.
Anh hùng thành bại xưa nay vậy
Chí đời chưa thoả hận vô ngần

I wished to revive Zhou and save the people,
Who would have known that Heaven's will does not follow man's desires?
The wide waters of Wu River are hard to cross eastward,
The high winds at Red Cliffs easily ignite the northern fires.
Dark clouds cover Ninh Mountain as the dragon flies far,
The bright moon shines on the blessed land where cranes come frequently.
Heroes have experienced both success and failure throughout history,
Yet I regret that my life's ambition has not been realized.

=== Phan Thanh Giản ===
Phan Thanh Giản was a Nguyễn dynasty official who held position of Hiệp biện Đại học sĩ (協辦大學士; Assistant to the Grand Secretariat). He was most well known for negotiating the Treaty of Saigon which led to three provinces being ceded to the French. On 20 June 1867, the French captured the city of Vĩnh Long. Phan Thanh Giản who had been to France and knew overwhelming military strength of the French, surrendered the citadel without resistance, under the condition that the French would ensure the safety of the local population. After the fall of the citadel, Phan Thanh Giản wrote a death poem and committed suicide at the age of 72.

唉𢖵源𢖵檜、
停欲利求榮。
唉𤑟透事情、
𤐝文明進步。
唉𫏙𦎛宗祖、
𠰷𭛣渃扶𤤰。

𦭧𦫼𦱊羅產業祖𠁀、
𨑮鋪冊羅沁唏留𡨺。
停認職朗沙割舉、 (Note: Pha Lang Sa 坡朗沙 was a historical name for France)
𠡧進身用𡨸誠心。

噤𠿯台吟吏碎琴、
子期𣩂𡘮㧺彈崔。 (Note: Ziqi 子期 was a person in recorded in the Spring and Autumn Annals 春秋經. He was a close friend of Bo Ya 伯雅. This moment refers to when Ziqi 子期 died, so Bo Ya 伯雅 broke his guqin and no longer played)
𡽫渃共埃仍噤𠿯、
𦊚𩈘𬲇春調伴奇。
知音悶劍吏空𠊚。

Hãy nhớ nguồn nhớ cội,
Đừng dục lợi cầu vinh.
Hãy rõ thấu sự tình,
Soi văn minh tiến bộ.
Hãy noi gương tông tổ,
Lo việc nước phò vua.

Túp lều tranh là sản nghiệp tổ đời,
Mười pho sách là tăm hơi lưu giữ.
Đừng nhận chức Lang Sa cắt cử,
Ráng tiến thân dùng chữ thành tâm.

Ngậm ngùi thay ngẫm lại toái cầm,
Tử Kỳ chết mất đập đàn thôi.
Non nước cùng ai những ngậm ngùi?
Bốn mặt gió xuân đều bạn cả.
Tri âm muốn kiếm lại không người.

Remember your roots and origins,
Do not seek profit and glory.
Be clear about the circumstances,
Reflect on civilization and progress.
Follow the example of your ancestors,
Assist the state and support the emperor.

A thatched hut is the inheritance of our forebears,
Ten books are the remnants of our legacy.
Do not accept positions appointed by the French,
Strive to advance with the words sincerity.

Regretfully reflect on the broken zither,
As Ziqi died, Boya played no more.
Who will share the sorrow of our land and water?
The winds of spring surround us, all are friends.
True confidants are sought, but there is no one.

=== Nguyễn Trung Trực ===
Nguyễn Trung Trực (阮忠直; 1838–1868) was a Vietnamese fisherman who organized and led village militia forces which fought against French colonial forces in the Mekong Delta in southern Vietnam in the 1860s. After Nguyễn Trung Trực captured the French citadel in Rạch Giá, the French had taken his mother hostage. The French ended up regaining control of the citadel and captured Nguyễn Trung Trực. Nguyễn Trung Trực was beheaded by the French at Rạch Giá on October 27, 1868. Nguyễn Trung Trực wrote a death poem shortly before his death.

書劍從戎自少年、
腰間膽氣有龍泉。
英雄若遇無容地、
抱恨深仇不戴天。

Thư kiếm tùng nhung tự thiếu niên,
Yêu gian đảm khí hữu Long Tuyền.
Anh hùng nhược ngộ vô dung địa,
Bão hận thâm cừu bất đới thiên.

Theo việc binh nhưng thuở trẻ trai,
Phong trần hăng hái tuốt gươm mài.
Anh hùng gặp phải hồi không đất,
Thù hận chang chang chẳng đội trời.

Since youth, with sword and book I went to war,
At my waist, the courage of Long Tuyền.
If a hero finds no place to stand,
He'll bear hatred so deep, it can't coexist under heaven.

== See also ==
- Elegy
- Epitaph
- Graveyard Poets
- Lament
- Last words
- Mi último adiós
- Ryōkan
- Suicide note
- Xie Lingyun
- Yuan Chonghuan
- Chinese Chán
- Japanese Zen
- Mono no aware
- Wabi-sabi
- Memento mori
- Swan song
