= Sokol (surname) =

Sokol is a surname of Slavic-language origin (meaning "falcon"). The surname is often associated with Jewish heritage. Notable people with the surname include:

- Alejandro Sokol (1961–2009), Argentine musician
- Alois Sokol (1914–1991), Czech fencer
- Andy Sokol (1928–1991), Canadian football player
- Artyom Sokol (Russian footballer) (born 1997), Russian footballer
- Artyom Anatolyevich Sokol (born 1994), Belarusian footballer
- Daniel Sokol (born 1978), French barrister and medical ethicist
- David L. Sokol (born 1956), American businessman
- František Sokol (1939–2011), Czech volleyball player
- Herman Sokol (1917–1985), American chemist
- Jan Sokol (disambiguation), multiple people
- Jason Sokol (born 1977), American historian
- Koloman Sokol (1902–2003), Slovak-American artist
- Kyle Sokol (born 1974), American bassist
- Marilyn Sokol (born 1944), American actress
- Matt Sokol (born 1995), American football player
- Natalia Sokol (born 1980), Russian activist
- Ondřej Sokol (born 1971), Czech director
- Paweł Sokół (born 2000), Polish footballer
- Pavel Sokol (born 1996), Czech footballer
- Pavel Sokol (rower) (born 1969), Czech rower
- Ronald Sokol (born 1939), American lawyer and writer
- Sasha Sokol (born 1970), Mexican singer
- Svyatoslav Sokol
- Tomislav Sokol (born 1982), Croatian politician
- Tony Sokol (born 1963), American playwright
- Vanina García Sokol (born 1983), Argentine tennis player
- Viktor Sokol (disambiguation), multiple people
- Vilem Sokol (1915–2011), Czech-American conductor

== See also ==
- Sokol (given name), people with the given name "Sokol"
- Sokolov (surname)
- Sokolović, surname
