= Sokolov =

Sokolov (masculine) or Sokolova (feminine) may refer to:

- Sokolov (surname) (or Sokolova).
- Sokolov (company), Russian jewelry company

== Places ==
- Sokolov District, a district in the Karlovy Vary Region of the Czech Republic
- Sokolov, Czech Republic, a town in the Karlovy Vary Region of the Czech Republic; capital of Sokolov District
- Sokolov, Russia (or Sokolova), several rural localities in Russia

== See also ==
- Sokolow, a variant spelling of the last name
- Sokoloff, surname
- Sokolović, surname
- Sokolovo (disambiguation)
- Sokolovac (disambiguation)
- Sokolovići (disambiguation)
- Sokołów (disambiguation)
