= Soko Grad =

Soko Grad (Serbian Cyrillic: Соко Град, lit. 'Falcon Town, Falcon Fort') may refer to:

== Serbia ==
- Soko Grad (Sokobanja), near the spa town of Sokobanja, Serbia
- Soko Grad (Ljubovija), near the town of Ljubovija, Serbia

== Bosnia ==
- Sokol (Usora), near the town of Gračanica, Bosnia and Herzegovina
- Sokograd (Pliva), near the small town of Šipovo, Bosnia and Herzegovina
- Sokolac Fortress (Bihać), near the town of Bihać, Bosnia and Herzegovina

== Croatia ==
- Sokol (Konavle), a fortress located in the village of Dunave in Konavle, Croatia

== Моntenegro ==
- Sokol Fortress (Piva), a medieval fortification near the confluence of rivers Piva and Tara
- Soko Grad (Štitar), above the village of Štitar
