= Sokil =

Sokil (Ukrainian: cокіл, lit. 'falcon') may refer to:

- Sokil Kyiv, Ukrainian professional ice hockey team
- SC Sokil, Ukrainian amateur rugby team
- Sokil Stadium (Stryi), stadium in Lviv Oblast, Ukraine
- Maria Sokil (1902–1999), Ukrainian opera singer
- Ukrainian Sokil movement, a gymnastics organization

== Places ==
- One of several rural settlements in Ukraine:
  - Sokil, Vinnytsia Oblast
  - Sokil, Volyn Oblast, Lyubomlsk District
  - Sokil, Volyn Oblast, Rozhyschensk District
  - Sokil, Donetsk Oblast
  - Sokil, Ivano-Frankivsk Oblast
  - Sokil, Lviv Oblast
  - Sokil, Khmelnytsky Oblast
- Sokil, Dnipro, neighborhood, microdistricts in Dnipro, Ukraine

== See also ==
- Sokal (disambiguation)
- Sokol (disambiguation)
