= Soko =

Soko may refer to:

== Places ==
- Soko (Gračanica), a village in Bosnia and Herzegovina
- Soko Islands, a group of islands in Hong Kong
- Soko Airport, an airport serving Bondoukou in Côte d'Ivoire
- South Korea, a Sovereign state in East Asia

== People ==
=== Stage name ===
- Soko (singer) (born 1985), French singer and actress

=== Given name ===
- Gesshū Sōko (1618–1696), Japanese Buddhist teacher
- Morinaga Sōkō (1925–1995), Japanese abbot
- Soko Richardson (1939–2004), American rhythm and blues drummer
- Soko Shimabuku (1926–2022), Japanese politician
- Yamaga Sokō (1622–1685), Japanese writer
- Soko Yamaoka (born 1974), Japanese snowboarder

=== Surname ===
- Boston Soko, professor at Mzuzu University
- Brian Soko (born 1991), Zimbabwean-American musician
- John Soko (1968–1993), Zambian footballer
- Judith Soko (born 2004), Zambian footballer
- Ovie Soko (born 1991), British basketball player
- Patrick Soko (born 1997), Cameroonian footballer
- Sam Soko (born 1985), Kenyan documentary filmmaker
- Vasiti Soko (fl. from 2006), Fijian GIS specialist

== Organisations ==
- Sokol movement, a sports movement known just as "Soko" in Serbian and some other languages.

== Other uses ==
- SOKO, a Yugoslavian aircraft manufacturer
- SOKO (TV series)
- SOKO 5113, a German police procedural television programme
  - SOKO Leipzig, a spin-off series
- Soko (band) or Sokoband, an American jazz fusion band
- Sökö, a variant of the five-card stud poker card game
- Soko, name of the train serving the Belgrade-Novi Sad section of the future Budapest–Belgrade railway.
- Soko languages, clade of Bantu languages
  - Soko language, language spoken in Orientale Province, Democratic Republic of the Congo

== See also ==
- Soko Grad (disambiguation)
