= ORP Sokół =

One ship and three submarines of the Polish Navy have been named ORP Sokół (Polish: "Falcon"):

- Sokół, a tugboat launched in 1920 and disposed of in 1957.
- ORP Sokół (1940), a British U-class submarine launched in 1940 and leased to Poland the same year. She served during World War II and was returned to Britain in 1945 as HMS Urchin. She was scrapped in 1949.
- ORP Sokół (1964), a Whiskey-class submarine purchased from the Soviet Union
- ORP Sokół (2002), a Kobben-class submarine, formerly the Norwegian Stord. She was transferred to Poland in 2002 and is currently a museum boat.

== See also ==
- Sokół (disambiguation)
