= Ryōkan =

Japanese Buddhist monk

- Title: Rōshi

Personal life
- Born: 1758 Niigata Prefecture, Japan
- Died: 18 February 1831 (aged 72–73)

Religious life
- Religion: Buddhism
- School: Sōtō

Taigu Ryōkan (大愚良寛; Japanese pronunciation: [ɾʲoꜜː.kaɴ], 1758 – 18 February 1831 (Note: Born Hōreki 8 (1758) - died 6th Mutsuki (一月), Tenpō 2 (1831) in the Japanese calendar.)) was a quiet and unorthodox Sōtō Zen Buddhist monk who lived much of his life as a hermit. Ryōkan is remembered for his poetry and calligraphy, which present the essence of Zen life.

== Early life ==
Ryōkan was born Eizō Yamamoto (山本栄蔵, Yamamoto Eizō) in the village of Izumozaki in Echigo Province (now Niigata Prefecture) in Japan to the village headman. He renounced the world at an early age to train at nearby Sōtō Zen temple Kōshō-ji, refusing to meet with or accept charity from his family. Once the Zen master Kokusen visited the temple, and Ryōkan was deeply impressed with his demeanour. He solicited permission to become Kokusen's disciple. Kokusen accepted, and the two returned to Entsū-ji monastery in Tamashima (now Okayama Prefecture).

It was at Entsū-ji that Ryōkan attained satori and was presented with an Inka by Kokusen. Kokusen died the following year, and Ryōkan left Entsū-ji to embark on a long pilgrimage. He lived much of the rest of his monastic life as a hermit. His decision to leave Entsū-ji may have been influenced by Gentō Sokuchū, the abbot of the temple. At the time, Gentō was aggressively reforming the Sōtō school to remove perceived 'foreign' elements, including kōan. The scholar Michel Mohr suggests Ryōkan may have been in disagreement with Gentō's efforts.

== Life as a hermit ==
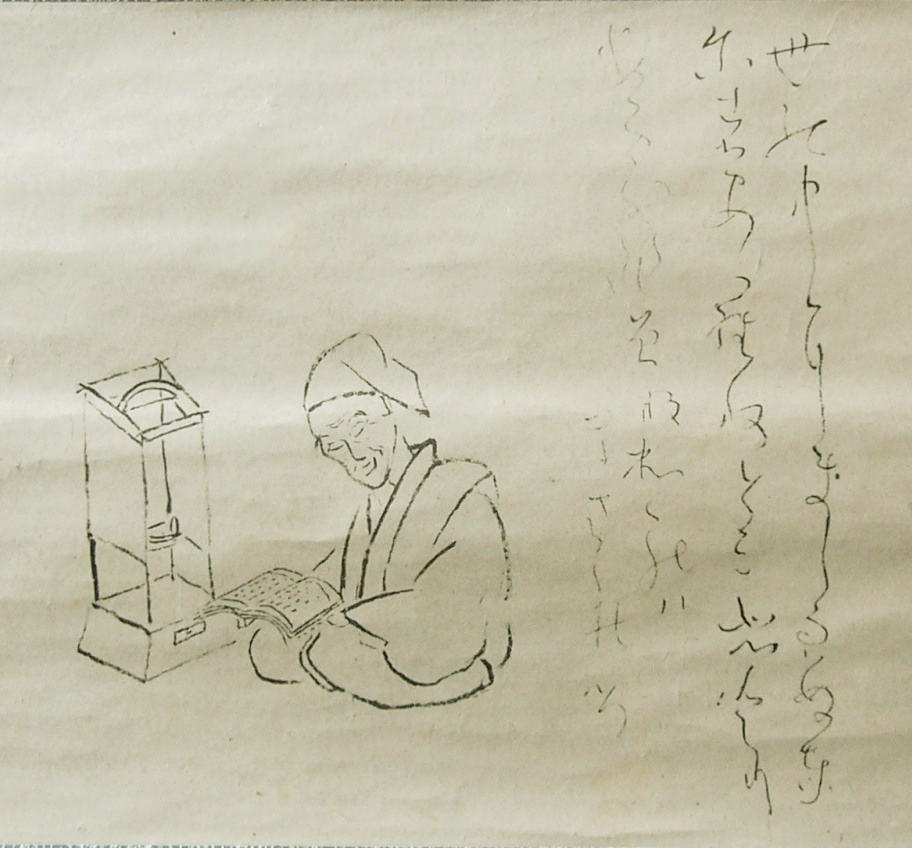
Portrait and calligraphy

Ryōkan spent much of his time writing poetry, doing calligraphy, and communing with nature. His poetry is often very simple and inspired by nature. He loved children, and sometimes forgot to beg for food because he was playing with the children of the nearby village. Ryōkan refused to accept any position as a priest or even as a "poet." In the tradition of Zen his quotes and poems show he had a good sense of humour and didn't take himself too seriously.

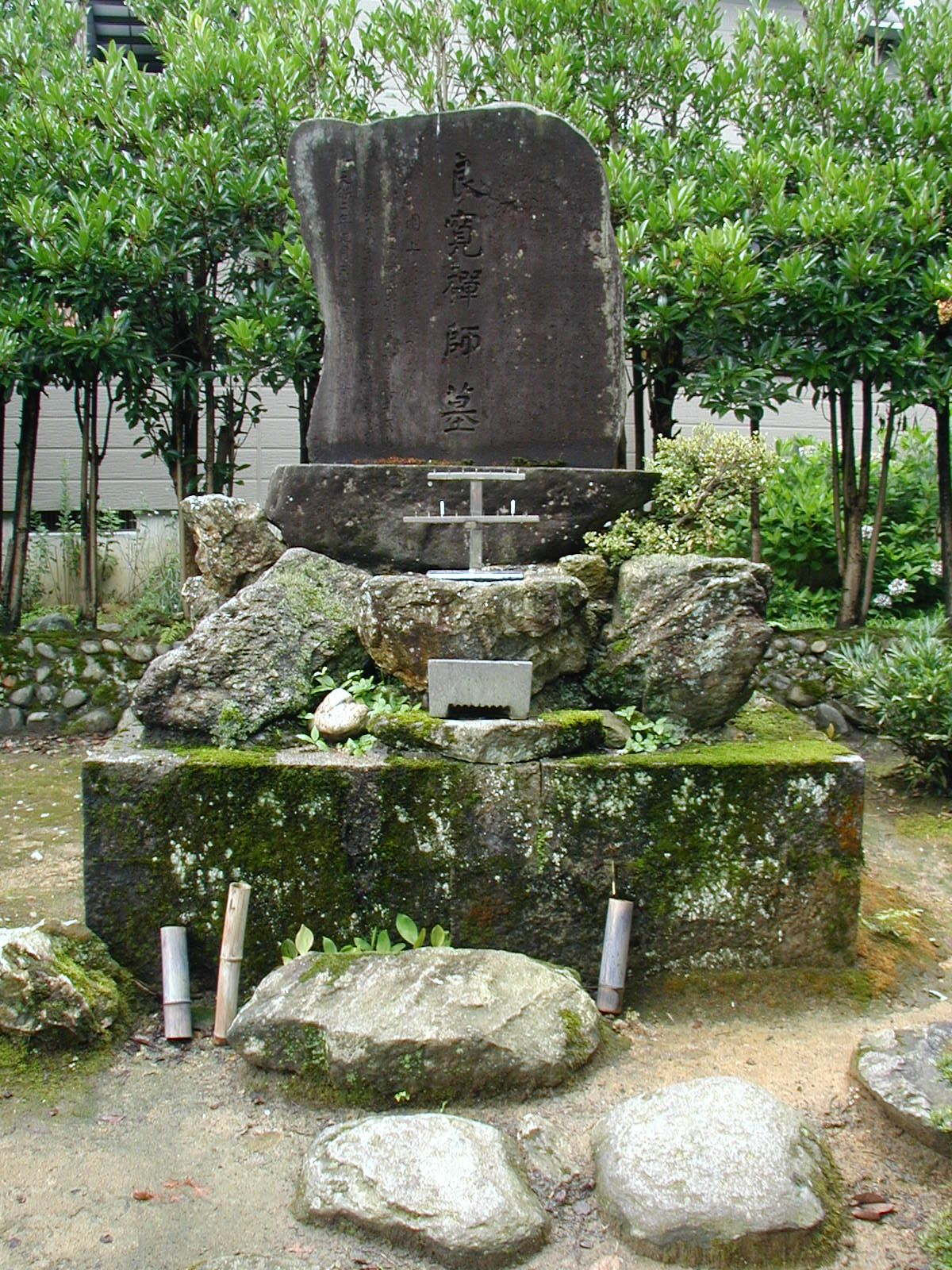
Ryōkan's grave

Ryōkan lived a very simple life, and stories about his kindness and generosity abound. On his deathbed, Ryōkan offered the following death poem to Teishin, his close companion:

裏を見せ 表を見せて 散る紅葉
うらをみせ おもてをみせて ちるもみじ
ura wo mise / omote wo misete / chiru momiji
Now it reveals its hidden side
and now the other—thus it falls,
an autumn leaf.

== Final years ==
In 1826 Ryōkan became ill and was unable to continue living as a hermit. He moved into the house of one of his patrons, Kimura Motouemon, and was cared for by a young nun called Teishin. "The [first] visit left them both exhilarated, and led to a close relationship that brightened Ryōkan's final years". The two of them exchanged a series of haiku. The poems they exchanged are both lively and tender. In his later years, as reflected in his devotional poetry, Ryōkan also adopted elements of Pure Land Buddhism into his practice, chanting nembutsu and aspiring for birth in Amida's Pure Land. Ryōkan died from his illness on the 6th day of the new year 1831. "Teishin records that Ryōkan, seated in meditation posture, died 'just as if he were falling asleep'".

== Stories of Ryōkan ==
It is common practice for a monk to abstain from eating meat. Once a young monk sat to dinner with Ryōkan and watched him eat fish. When asked why, Ryōkan replied, “I eat fish when it's offered, but I also let the fleas and flies feast on me [when sleeping at night]. Neither bothers me at all.”

It is said Ryōkan only slept with most of his body inside of a mosquito net so that he would not hurt the bugs outside.

Ryōkan was fond of rice wine and would sometimes drink it to excess. "I send one of the children to buy some country wine/ And after I'm drunk, toss off a few lines of calligraphy."

Ryōkan attended the midsummer Bon Festivals. Because he was a monk, he would normally be unable to attend, but sneaked in disguised as a woman.

Ryōkan hated waste, and so any food that he was offered that he did not eat, he put into a little pot. Over time, the food rotted and became filled with maggots and other bugs. When warned against eating it, all Ryōkan said was, “No, no, it's all right. I let the maggots escape before I eat it and it tastes just fine!”

One evening a thief visited Ryōkan's hut at the base of the mountain only to discover there was nothing to steal. Ryōkan returned and caught him. "You have come a long way to visit me," he told the prowler, "and you should not return empty-handed. Please take my clothes as a gift." The thief was bewildered. He took the clothes and slunk away. Ryōkan sat naked, watching the moon. "Poor fellow," he mused, "I wish I could have given him this beautiful moon." This story may be an interpretation of an account mentioned by Ryōkan in a haiku:

盗人に 取り残されし 窓の月
ぬすっとに とりのこされし まどのつき
nusutto ni / torinokosareshi / mado no tsuki
The thief left it behind:
the moon
at my window.
