= Gangoku Kankei =

Soto Zen patriarch

Gangoku Kankei 頑極官慶
- Title: Chán master

Personal life
- Born: 1683 Hizen Province, Japan
- Died: 1767 (aged 83–84)

Religious life
- Religion: Buddhism
- Denomination: Chán/Zen
- School: Caodong/Sōtō

Senior posting
- Predecessor: Mokushi Soen
- Students: Gentō Sokuchū Kokoku Soryu

Gangoku Kankei (Japanese: 頑極官慶) was a Sōtō Zen priest of the Edo period. He was the founding abbot of Shinpo-ji temple (新豊寺) in Nagoya Prefecture. The prominent modern Zen teachers Dainin Katagiri and Sawaki Kōdō both trace their lineages back to Gangoku.
