= Jan Sokol =

Jan Sokol may refer to:

- Jan Sokol of Lamberk (c.1355–1410), Moravian nobleman
- Jan Sokol (philosopher) (1936–2021), Czech philosopher
- Ján Sokol (bishop) (born 1933), Slovak archbishop and priest
- Ján Sokol (footballer) (born 1985), Slovak football striker
- Jan Sokol (cyclist) (born 1990), Austrian cyclist
