= Sokolov, Russia =

Sokolov (Russian: Соколов; masculine) or Sokolova (Соколова; feminine) is the name of several rural localities in Russia:

- Sokolov, Republic of Adygea, a khutor in Koshekhablsky District of the Republic of Adygea
- Sokolov, Oryol Oblast, a settlement in Apalkovsky Selsoviet of Kromskoy District of Oryol Oblast
- Sokolov, Volgograd Oblast, a khutor in Verkhnegnutovsky Selsoviet of Chernyshkovsky District of Volgograd Oblast
- Sokolova, Perm Krai, a village in Ilyinsky District of Perm Krai
- Sokolova, Baykalovsky District, Sverdlovsk Oblast, a village in Baykalovsky District of Sverdlovsk Oblast
- Sokolova, Irbitsky District, Sverdlovsk Oblast, a village in Irbitsky District of Sverdlovsk Oblast
- Sokolova, Kamensky District, Sverdlovsk Oblast, a village in Kamensky District of Sverdlovsk Oblast
- Sokolova, Kamensky District, Sverdlovsk Oblast, a village in Kamensky District of Sverdlovsk Oblast
- Sokolova, Tyumen Oblast, a village in Severo-Pletnevsky Rural Okrug of Yurginsky District of Tyumen Oblast
