= Gentō Sokuchū =

Japanese Buddhist monk (1729–1807)

Gentō Sokuchū 玄透即中
- Title: Abbot of Eihei-ji

Personal life
- Born: 1729 Japan
- Died: 1807 (aged 77–78)

Religious life
- Religion: Zen Buddhism
- School: Sōtō

Senior posting
- Teacher: Gangoku Kankei
- Predecessor: Gangoku Kankei
- Students: Kyozan Baizen

Gentō Sokuchū (Japanese: 玄透即中) was a Sōtō Zen priest and the 50th abbot of Eihei-ji, the school's head temple. He was part of a 17th and 18th century movement within the Sōtō school that sought to bring the school's teachings back in line with those of the 13th century founding teacher, Dōgen. To this end, he edited major editions of works by Dōgen and succeeded in disseminating them widely. He is best remembered for compiling the Eihei Rules of Purity (Eihei Shingi), a collection of writings by Dōgen laying out a strict code of conduct for monks. These rules had been largely unheeded in the school in the preceding several centuries, and Gentō used his high position as abbot of Eihei-ji to reintroduce and enforce them. His work on the Eihei Rules of Purity was completed in 1794 while he was serving as the eleventh abbot of Entsū-ji. The following year he became the 50th abbot of Eihei-ji. He was also involved in editing Dōgen's master work, the Shōbōgenzō.

In addition to his efforts on monastic rules, he also sought to remove what he perceived to be non-Sōtō elements within the school. He de-emphasized the use of koans due to their apparent historical association with the competing Rinzai school. In 1796 he also had the sangha hall (sōdō, 僧堂) at Eihei-ji rebuilt in imitation of the Song dynasty structures that Dōgen had described. The previous building, dating from only fifty years earlier, was built in a Ming dynasty style based on temples of the recently introduced Ōbaku school. Gentō's former student at Entsū-ji was the famous wandering monk Ryōkan. The Buddhist scholar Michel Mohr suggests that Gentō's fanaticism for 'purifying' the Sōtō school probably informed Ryōkan's decision to become an itinerant monk without an association to any temple.

== See also ==
- Buddhism in Japan
