= Sokal (surname) =

Sokal (Belarusian: Сокал, "falcon") is a surname. Notable people with the surname include:

- Alan Sokal (born 1955), American physicist, mathematician, and critic of postmodernism
- Anton Sokał-Kutyłoŭski, Belarusian independent activist
- Benoît Sokal (1954–2021), Belgian comics artist and video game developer
- Harry R. Sokal (1898–1979), Romanian-German film producer
- Harry Sokal (musician) (born 1954), Austrian saxophonist
- Michael Sokal, American historian
- Robert R. Sokal (1926–2012), American biostatistician
- Viktar Sokal, Belarusian footballers
