= Sokol (given name) =

- Gender: Male

Origin
- Region of origin: Albania, Kosovo

Sokol is an Albanian masculine given name. Notable people with the given name include:

- Sokol Baci (1837–1920), Albanian revolutionary, chief of the Gruda
- Sokol Balla (born 1973), Albanian journalist, writer and talk show host
- Sokol Bashota (born 1966), Kosovo politician
- Sokol Bishanaku (born 1971), Albanian weightlifter
- Sokol Bulku (born 1978), Albanian footballer
- Sokol Cikalleshi (born 1990), Albanian footballer
- Sokol Gjoka (born 1958), Albanian diplomat
- Sokol Kushta (born 1964), Albanian footballer
- Sokol Lleshi (born 1996), Albanian footballer
- Sokol Maliqi (born 1981) Kosovar footballer
- Sokol Mziu (born 1987), Albanian footballer
- Sokol Neziri (born 1996), Albanian footballer
- Sokol Olldashi (1972–2013), Albanian politician
- Sokol Prenga (born 1971), Albanian footballer
- Sokol Shameti (born 1978), Albanian journalist
