= Vasiti Soko =

Fijian disaster risk management specialist and humanitarian leader

Vasiti Soko is a Fijian disaster risk management specialist, geospatial scientist, humanitarian leader, and climate resilience practitioner. She is best known for serving as the first female Director of the National Disaster Management Office (NDMO) of Fiji from 2019 to 2024. She currently serves as Emergency Operations Planning Coordinator at the University of California, Berkeley, Associate Director for Climate and Disaster (Indo-Pacific) at Tetra Tech, and Pacific Regional Director for the Practitioner Exchange for Effective Response to Sea Level Rise (PEERS). In October 2021, she was awarded the inaugural Women's International Network for Disaster Risk Reduction (WIN DRR) Excellence in Leadership Award by the United Nations Office for Disaster Risk Reduction (UNDRR).

== Education ==
Soko obtained a Bachelor of Arts in Geography and Land Use Planning and a Diploma in Geographic Information Systems (GIS) from the University of the South Pacific (USP) in Suva, Fiji. She later obtained a Master of Geospatial Science from RMIT University in Melbourne, Australia.

== Career ==
After graduating from USP, Soko worked in a variety of geospatial and disaster risk management roles throughout the Pacific region. She supported projects in Fiji, Micronesia, Australia, Thailand, and other Pacific Island countries, focusing on hazard mapping, disaster risk assessment, spatial data management, and resilience planning.

Between 2013 and 2016, she served as GIS Manager for Fiji's Sugar Industry Tribunal, where she developed a GIS web portal linking Fiji's four major sugar mills and providing real-time harvesting information. She also contributed to maritime boundary mapping and national geospatial initiatives.

In 2019, Soko was appointed the first female Director of Fiji's National Disaster Management Office (NDMO). During her tenure she led Fiji's disaster management system through multiple tropical cyclones, floods, volcanic ash events, and other national emergencies. She was the national focal point for the United Nations' Early Warning for All initiative and oversaw the establishment of Fiji's National Emergency Response Team (NERT), national simulation exercises, and anticipatory action programmes supported by international partners.

Soko became widely known in Fiji through her regular disaster briefings and became the first NDMO Director to introduce sign language interpretation into all national disaster media briefings.

She played a leading role in strengthening Fiji's disaster governance framework, including the modernization of disaster legislation through the Disaster Risk Management Act 2024 and the advancement of inclusive disaster risk reduction approaches for women, persons with disabilities, and vulnerable communities.

== Regional and international leadership ==
Soko has held several regional and international leadership positions in disaster risk reduction, humanitarian coordination, and climate resilience.

She is a member of the United Nations Disaster Assessment and Coordination (UNDAC) system and has contributed to international disaster response and preparedness initiatives. She has also served on the INSARAG Steering Group, the Executive Council of the Coalition for Disaster Resilient Infrastructure (CDRI), the Pacific Response to Disaster Displacement Advisory Board, and the Asia-Pacific Technical Working Group on Disaster-related Statistics.

In 2025, she was appointed Pacific Regional Director for the Practitioner Exchange for Effective Response to Sea Level Rise (PEERS), a global practitioner network focused on coastal adaptation and resilience to sea level rise.

== Consulting and entrepreneurship ==
Following her relocation to the United States in 2024, Soko continued her work in climate resilience, disaster risk reduction, and humanitarian preparedness through consulting and advisory roles.

She is the founder of ViPACT Consulting, a consultancy specializing in disaster risk reduction, climate adaptation, humanitarian preparedness, geospatial analysis, monitoring and evaluation, and gender equality, disability and social inclusion (GEDSI).

Through ViPACT Consulting, Soko led the development of the Solomon Islands Loss and Damage Evidence Base Report, which examined the impacts of climate change, disaster losses, non-economic losses, and resilience priorities to support national and regional climate policy.

She is also a founding member of Pacific AI Talent, a Pacific-focused talent sourcing and recruitment platform utilizing artificial intelligence to support workforce development and recruitment across the Pacific region. She has further contributed to the development of Fiji Travel Hub and Talent Source AI, digital platforms focused on tourism promotion and technology-enabled recruitment services.

== University of California, Berkeley ==
In 2025, Soko joined the Office of Emergency Management at the University of California, Berkeley as Emergency Operations Planning Coordinator. Her work focuses on campus-wide emergency operations planning, emergency preparedness training, building emergency coordinator programmes, emergency exercises, continuity planning, and inclusive emergency management.

== Awards and honours ==
In October 2021, Soko became the inaugural recipient of the Women's International Network for Disaster Risk Reduction (WIN DRR) Excellence in Leadership Award, presented by the United Nations Office for Disaster Risk Reduction in partnership with Australian Aid. The award recognized her leadership in strengthening disaster risk governance, promoting inclusion, and advancing disaster risk reduction across Fiji and the Pacific region.

- Women's International Network for Disaster Risk Reduction (WIN DRR) Excellence in Leadership Award (2021)
- Fiji Sun "10 Outstanding Fijians" Recognition (2020)
