= Sokol (Lusatian Mountains) =

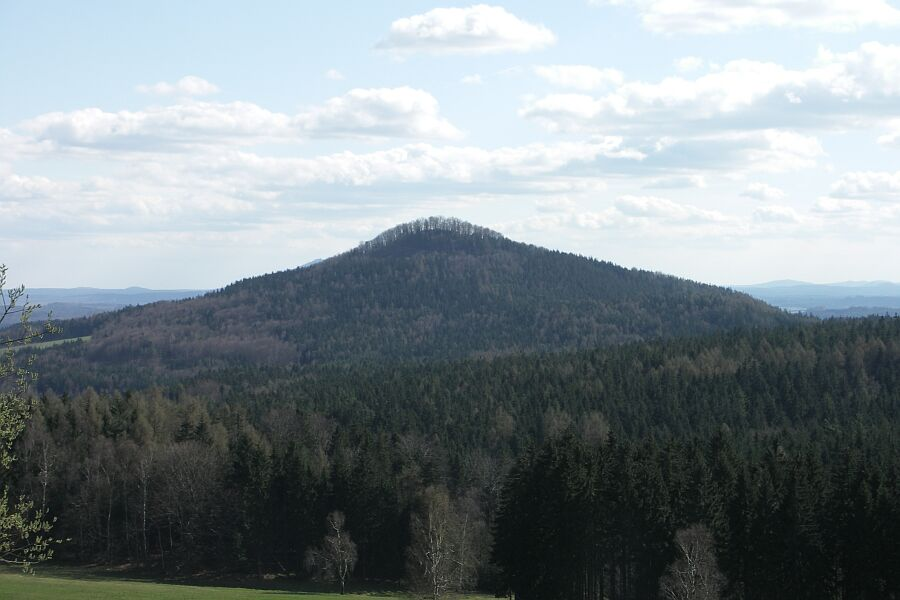
- Sokol (Falkenberg) seen from Lückendorf

Highest point
- Elevation: 592.5 m (1,944 ft)
- Prominence: 129 m (423 ft)
- Isolation: 1.9 km (1.2 mi)
- Coordinates: 50°48′24.5″N 14°45′0″E

Geography
- Location within Czech Republic
- Location: Czech Republic
- Parent range: Lusatian Mountains

Sokol (German Falkenberg) is a cone-shaped peak in the Lusatian Mountains, just south of the frontier between Germany and the Czech Republic. There are traces at the summit of a medieval castle—Starý Falkenburk (Alte Falkenburg).

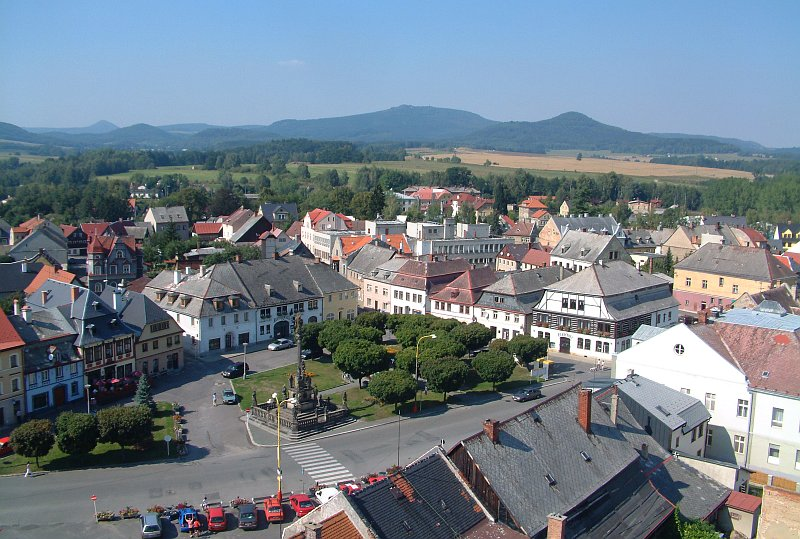
View northwards from Jablonné v Podještědí; Sokol is the peak furthest to the right.
