= Ravesa Lleshi =

Albanian diplomat (born 1976)

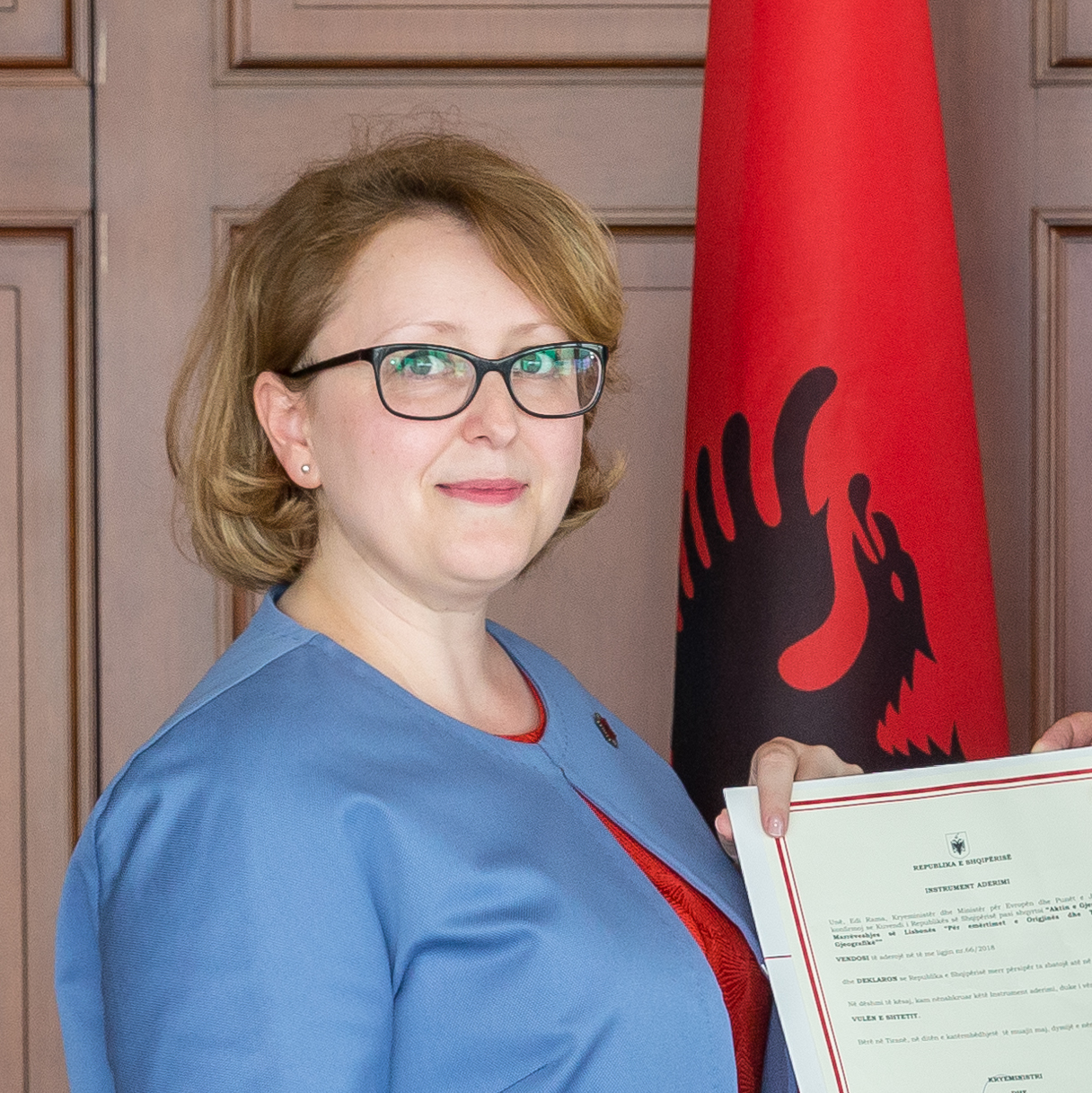
- in 2019
- Born: 1 June 1976 (age 49)

Ravesa Lleshi (born 1 June 1976) became the Albanian Permanent Representative to the United Nations Office at Geneva in 2018.

== Life ==
Lleshi was born in 1976 and she graduated in the Netherlands from Tilburg University with a master's degree in international and European public law. She is fluent in English and Dutch.

From 2010 until 2014 she was in Tirana where she lectured at the facility offered there by the University of New York Tirana.

She was based in Austria from March 2016 when she led her country's mission to the Organization for Security and Cooperation in Europe until January 2018 when she became an adviser to the Minister of Foreign Affairs.

She became the Albanian Permanent Representative to the United Nations Office at Geneva in 2018. Lleshi is also responsible for her country's representation with the World Intellectual Property Organization, for instance in 2019 she was one of the first to sign up to an international agreement that would give protection to regional products such as Darjeeling tea.
