= Viktor Sokol =

Viktor Sokol (Russian: Виктор Сокол) or Viktar Sokal (Belarusian: Вiктар Сокал) may refer to:

- Viktor Sokol (footballer born 1954), Soviet and Belarusian footballer
- Viktor Sokol (footballer born 1981), Belarusian footballer, son of above

== See also ==
- Sokol (surname)
