= Sokor =

Sokor Сокорь
- Khutor
- Location within Astrakhan Oblast Location within Russia
- Coordinates: 48°23′N 45°46′E
- Country: Russia
- Region: Astrakhan Oblast
- District: Akhtubinsky District
- Time zone: UTC+4:00

Sokor (Russian: Сокорь) is a rural locality (a khutor) in Kapustinoyarsky Selsoviet of Akhtubinsky District, Astrakhan Oblast, Russia. The population was 4 as of 2010. There is 1 street.

== Geography ==
Sokor is located 67 km northwest of Akhtubinsk (the district's administrative centre) by road. Duyunov is the nearest rural locality.
