= Sokol, Russia =

Name of Russian localities

Sokol (Russian: Со́кол; lit. "falcon") is the name of several inhabited localities in Russia.

Urban localities

- Sokol, Vologda Oblast, a town in Vologda Oblast
- Sokol, Magadan Oblast, an urban-type settlement under the administrative jurisdiction of the town of Magadan, Magadan Oblast

Rural localities

- Sokol, Oryol Oblast, a settlement in Mtsensky District of Oryol Oblast
- Sokol, Tver Oblast, a village in Kalininsky District of Tver Oblast
- Sokol, name of several other rural localities

Abolished inhabited localities

- Sokol, Republic of Buryatia, an urban-type settlement under the administrative jurisdiction of the city of Ulan-Ude, Republic of Buryatia; abolished in February 2010
