= Mustafa Lleshi =

Mustafa Lleshi was an Albanian anti-fascist hero of World War II.

Mustafa Lleshi Street, a street in Tirana, the capital of Albania, is named in his honor.
