= Sokol (camera) =

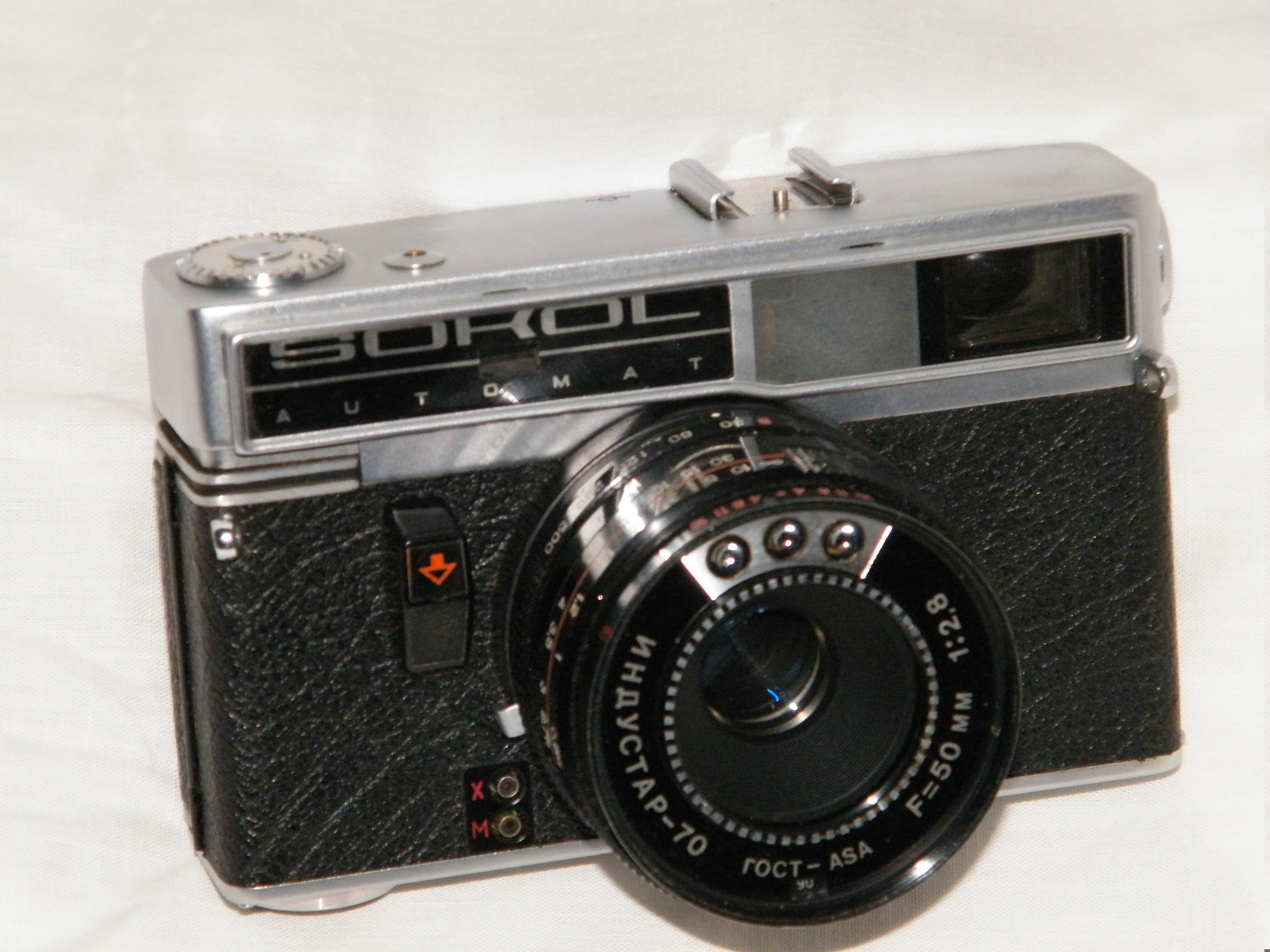
Sokol 1977

Sokol Automat and Sokol-2 were Soviet 35 mm photo camera brands. In 1966–1986, more than 400,000 were produced by LOMO. Some were exported to Europe. The price of the camera in 1977 was 145 rubles, almost one and a half times more expensive than the mirror "Zenith-E" with interchangeable optics. For Soviet photographers, Sokol proved to be too expensive, and for professional photography it was unsuitable. In 1978, the production of the Sokol Automat was discontinued leaving the Sokol 2, a total of 226,600 copies came off the assembly line, as well as 1,000 cameras called "LOMO-130A" which was the same as the Sokol 2 but with only 1 window for the metering cell, and different styling.

== Technical parameters ==
- Type: Rangefinder camera
- Lens: Industar-70, non-removable - 50mm/f2.8 single coated - Tessar type lens - 0.8m - ∞
- Shutter: Central, Copal Magic-type, 1/30 + B - 1/500
- Film: 35 mm, 36 frames
- Viewfinder: Bright, blue-tinted viewfinder with a yellow focusing patch and frame lines which are automatically parallax corrected as well as a shutter speed/aperture display on the right with an underexposure warning
- Metering: Shutter priority metering powered by a CdS sensor which automatically raises or lowers the shutter speed if it deems it inadequate for an accurate exposure, 20-320 ASA metering
- Battery: PX625 1.35 volt Mercury battery, PX625 Alkaline 1.5 volt can be used but the meter will have a 1.5 stop underexposure at the beginning of the battery's life unless an adapter which lowers the voltage down to 1.35 is used

== History ==
When creating the Sokol automatic camera, problems arose with installing a reliable shutter. The designers decided that the quality of the camera would be ensured by the Japanese shutter Copal Magic. Specialists from two institutes were engaged in testing the strength and reliability of its design: The optical-mechanical institute in Leningrad and the Vavilov State Optical Institute. All the designers noted the excellent performance of the Japanese shutter. In 1965, the USSR bought a license-permission for its production from the Japanese company Copal. On Sokol cameras, the new shutter was marked "FZ-14". The shutter was a complex mechanism, the design of which included about 400 parts.

The prototype for the development of the "Sokol" was the Japanese "Fujica 35 Auto-M" camera with electronically controlled center shutter Copal Magic.

"Sokol" means "falcon" in Russian, hence the name was probably intended to bring associations with the "eye of a falcon" - the saying for excellent vision, and because the photographer can see the selected settings by the automatic program.
