= Ján Sokol (footballer) =

Slovak footballer (born 1985)

Personal information
- Date of birth: 13 September 1985 (age 41)
- Place of birth: Bardejov, Czechoslovakia
- Height: 1.72 m (5 ft 7 1/2 in)
- Position: Striker

Team information
- Current team: SV Bad Ischl

Youth career
- Partizán Bardejov
- Slovan Bratislava

Senior career*
Years	Team	Apps	(Gls)
2002–2008	Dubnica	60	(3)
2009–2010	Hlučín		
2010	Senec		
2011	Bardejov	11	(1)
2011–	SV Bad Ischl		
- * Club domestic league appearances and goals as of 3 August 2011 ‡ National team caps and goals as of 3 April 2011

Ján Sokol (born 13 September 1985, in Bardejov) is a Slovak football striker who currently plays for SV Bad Ischl. His former club was Partizán Bardejov.
