= Gesshū Sōko =

Zen Buddhist teacher and calligrapher

- Title: Zen Master

Personal life
- Born: 1618 Japan
- Died: 1696 (aged 77–78)

Religious life
- Religion: Buddhism
- School: Sōtō

Gesshū Sōko (1618–1696) was a Japanese Zen Buddhist teacher and a member of the Sōtō school of Zen in Japan. He studied under teachers of the lesser known, and more strictly monastic, Ōbaku School of Zen and contributed to a reformation of Sōtō monastic codes. As a result, he is sometimes given the title "The Revitalizer".

He is known for his calligraphy as well as his poetry, including his death poem:

Inhale, exhale
Forward, back
Living, dying:
Arrows, let flown each to each
Meet midway and slice
The void in aimless flight --
Thus I return to the source.

Gesshū Sōko passed Dharma transmission to Zen Master Manzan Dōhaku who went on to restore the strong master-disciple bond in Sōtō Zen.
