= Hồ Huân Nghiệp =

Vietnamese scholar

Hồ Huân Nghiệp (胡勳業, 1829–1864), courtesy name Thiệu Tiên (紹先), was a 19th-century Vietnamese scholar notable as one of the first generation of Vietnamese people who fought against the French in Gia Định.

== Biography ==
Hồ Huân Nghiệp was born in An Định village, Dương Hòa district, Bình Dương, Phiên An town (now Tân Phú district, Hồ Chí Minh city).

When the French and Spanish troops invaded the three provinces of the South East (1859), the Nguyễn army was repeatedly defeated, causing Trương Định to retreat to Tân Hòa (Gò Công) to set up a plan of advocacy. In the face of the invasion, Hồ Huân Nghiệp and his mother moved to Chợ Đệm (now in Tân Túc Commune, Bình Chánh District, Ho Chi Minh City) he married so that his mother would have someone who could take care of her. He then accepted the offer of Trương Định to manage Tân Bình Government.

Hồ Huân Nghiệp was captured and apprehended in 1864, because he refused to submit to French army, he was beheaded.
