= Sokolov, Volgograd Oblast =

Sokolov Соколов
- Khutor
- Location within Volgograd Oblast Location within Russia
- Coordinates: 48°16′N 42°18′E
- Country: Russia
- Region: Volgograd Oblast
- District: Chernyshkovsky District
- Time zone: UTC+4:00

Sokolov (Russian: Соколов) is a rural locality (a khutor) in Verkhnegnutovskoye Rural Settlement, Chernyshkovsky District, Volgograd Oblast, Russia. The population was 78 as of 2020.

== Geography ==
Sokolov is located on the left bank of the Tsimla River, 21 km (13 mi) southeast of Chernyshkovsky (the district's administrative centre) by road. Verkhnegnutov is the nearest rural locality.
