= Szokol =

Szokol or Szokoll is a Hungarian-language surname. The word is the transliteration of the Slavic word "Sokol". The surname may refer to:

- Zsolt Szokol (born 1990), Hungarian football defender
- Carl Szokoll (1915–2004), Austrian resistance fighter
- Elizabeth Szokol (born 1995), American professional golfer
