= Soko Grad (Sokobanja) =

Medieval city and fortress near Sokobanja, Serbia

Soko Grad; Sokolac Соко Град; Соколац
- near Sokobanja; Serbia
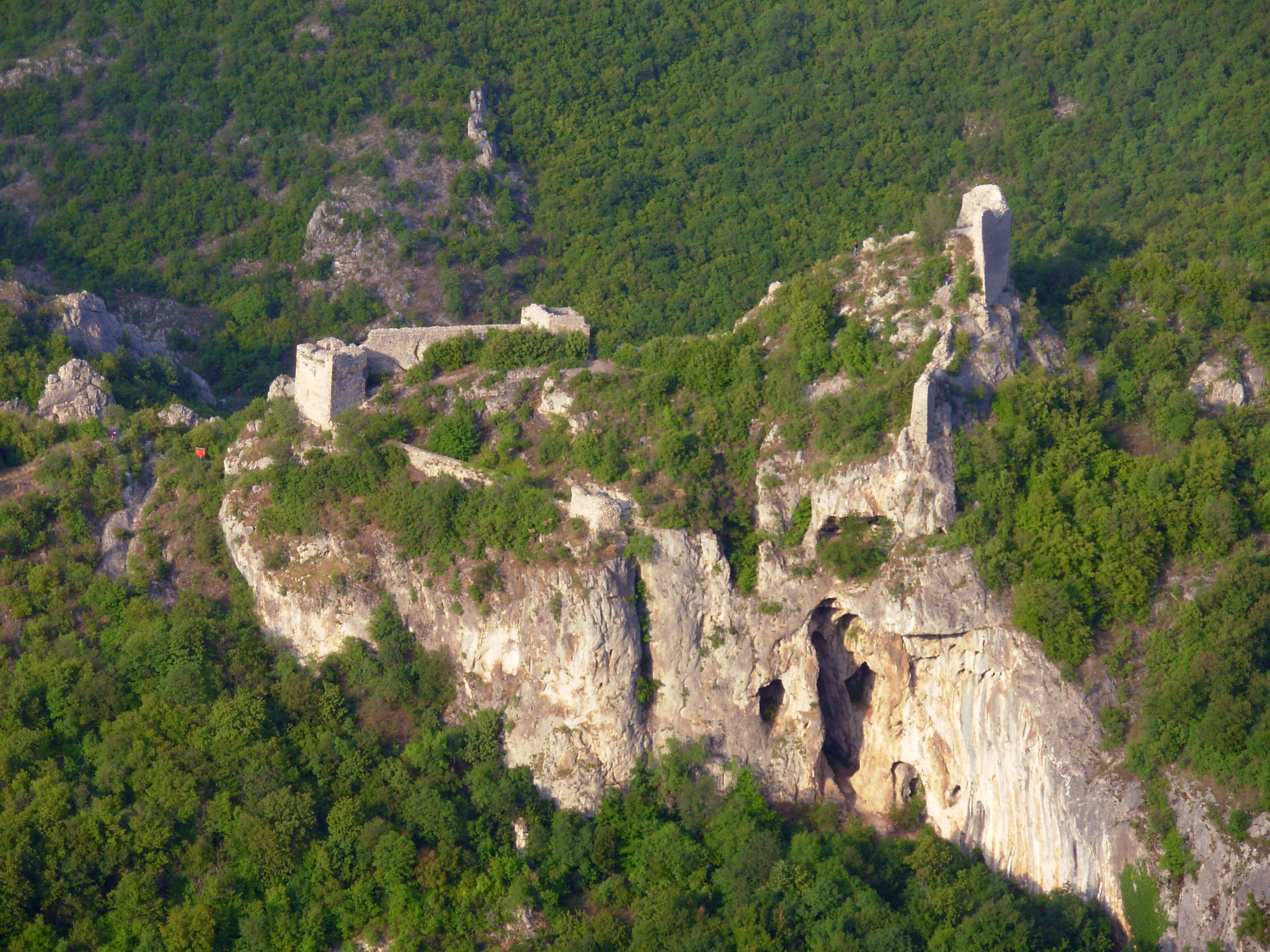
- Remains of Sokolac

Site information
- Type: Strategic fortification
- Open to the public: Yes

Location
- Coordinates: 43°38′06″N 21°53′35″E

Site history
- Built: 6th century
- Built by: Justinian I
- Materials: Stone

Soko Grad (Serbian Cyrillic: Соко Град), also known as Sokolac, is a medieval city and fortress 2 km east of the spa town of Sokobanja, Serbia. The fortress was declared a Monument of Culture of Great Importance in 1982, and it is protected by the Republic of Serbia.

== History ==
The fortress was founded in the 6th century during the reign of Eastern Roman Emperor Justinian I, to prevent incursions of Pannonian Avars and Slavs into Balkan Peninsula. In 1172, it was occupied by Stefan Nemanja and became part of the medieval Serbian state. During the expulsion of the Bogomils from Serbia, Nemanja had a clash with the administrator of Soko, who was a Bogomil himself. The Ottoman Empire occupied it in the year 1398. The town was destroyed in a violent Ottoman attack, and today the only thing visible is the remains of the upper town with a gate, walls, and three towers. Soko Grad's name translates to "falcon city". It got its name because there were many falconers in the town, who paid taxes with trained falcons.

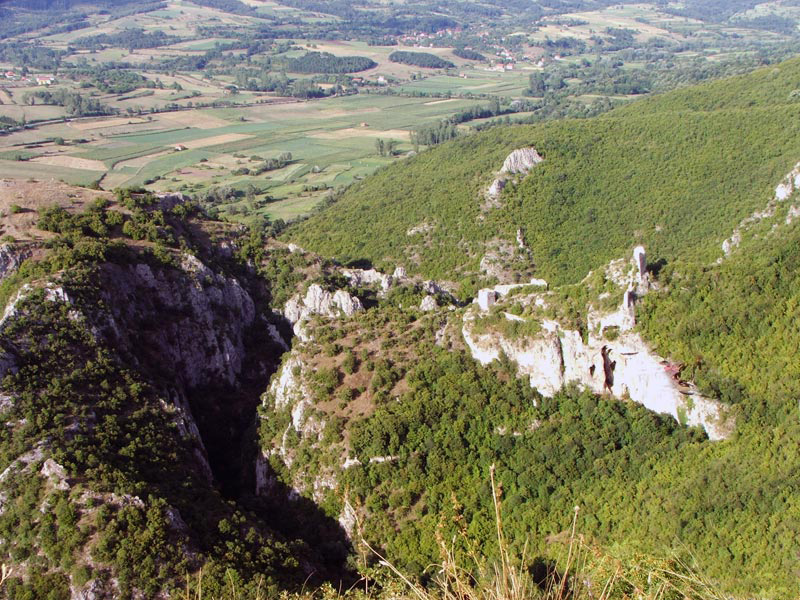
A look at the remains and the terrain

== Characteristics ==
The original fortification built by Justinian was the citadel built on the tallest part of the rock, rendering it practically unreachable by the enemy. During the subsequent development in Serbian state, the fortress expanded around the citadel and spread lower down the rock. In the middle of the fortification on the top was a citadel with a dominant main tower. From there bulwarks were lowering toward Moravica, forming that way space of Lower town, that was built on more reachable ground. The entire fortification complex had several towers, of which only a few remain today. Only the first entrance tower in Upper town is preserved and in good shape, while other towers and bulwarks are in ruins.

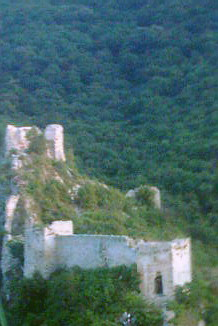
Towers of the upper town

== See also ==
- Monuments of Culture of Great Importance
- Tourism in Serbia
