= Sokol Lleshi =

Albanian footballer

Personal information
- Full name: Sokol Lleshi
- Date of birth: 11 February 1996 (age 30)
- Place of birth: Dibër, Albania
- Position: Midfielder

Youth career
- 2010–2016: Partizani

Senior career*
Years	Team	Apps	(Gls)
2017–2019	Korabi	10	(0)
- * Club domestic league appearances and goals

Sokol Lleshi (born 11 February 1996) is an Albanian professional footballer who plays as a midfielder.
