= Sokolac (fortress near Bihać) =

Fortress near the village of Sokolac, near Bihać, Bosnia and Herzegovina

- Sokolac, Bihać, Bosnia
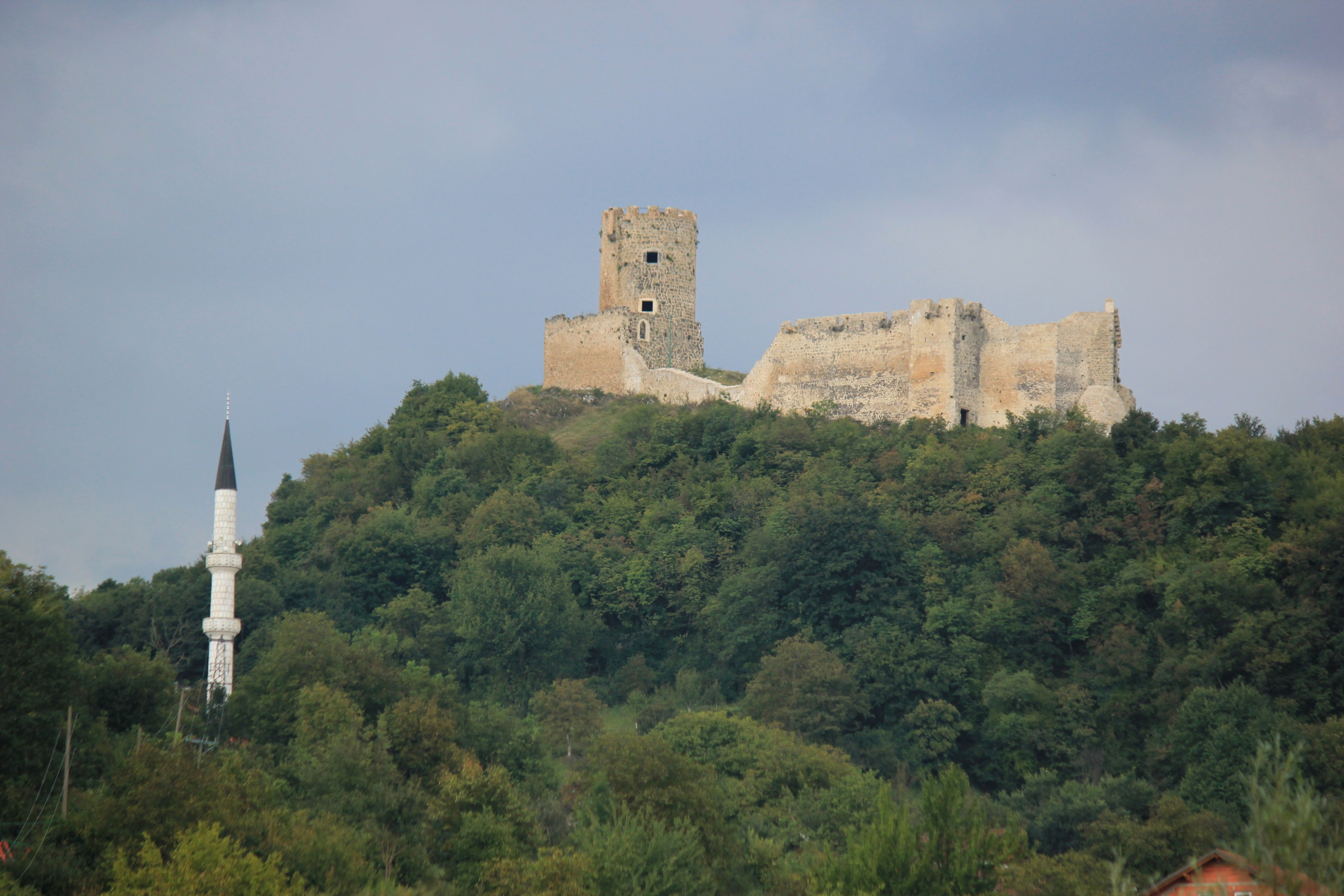

Site information
- Type: fortress

Location
- Coordinates: 44.786°N 15.895°E

Site history
- Built for: Kingdom of Hungary, Ottoman Empire
- In use: 14th-19th century

Sokolac is a fortress located near the village of Sokolac, near Bihać, Bosnia and Herzegovina, originating in the Middle Ages. It is also referred to as Sokol or Sokol grad.

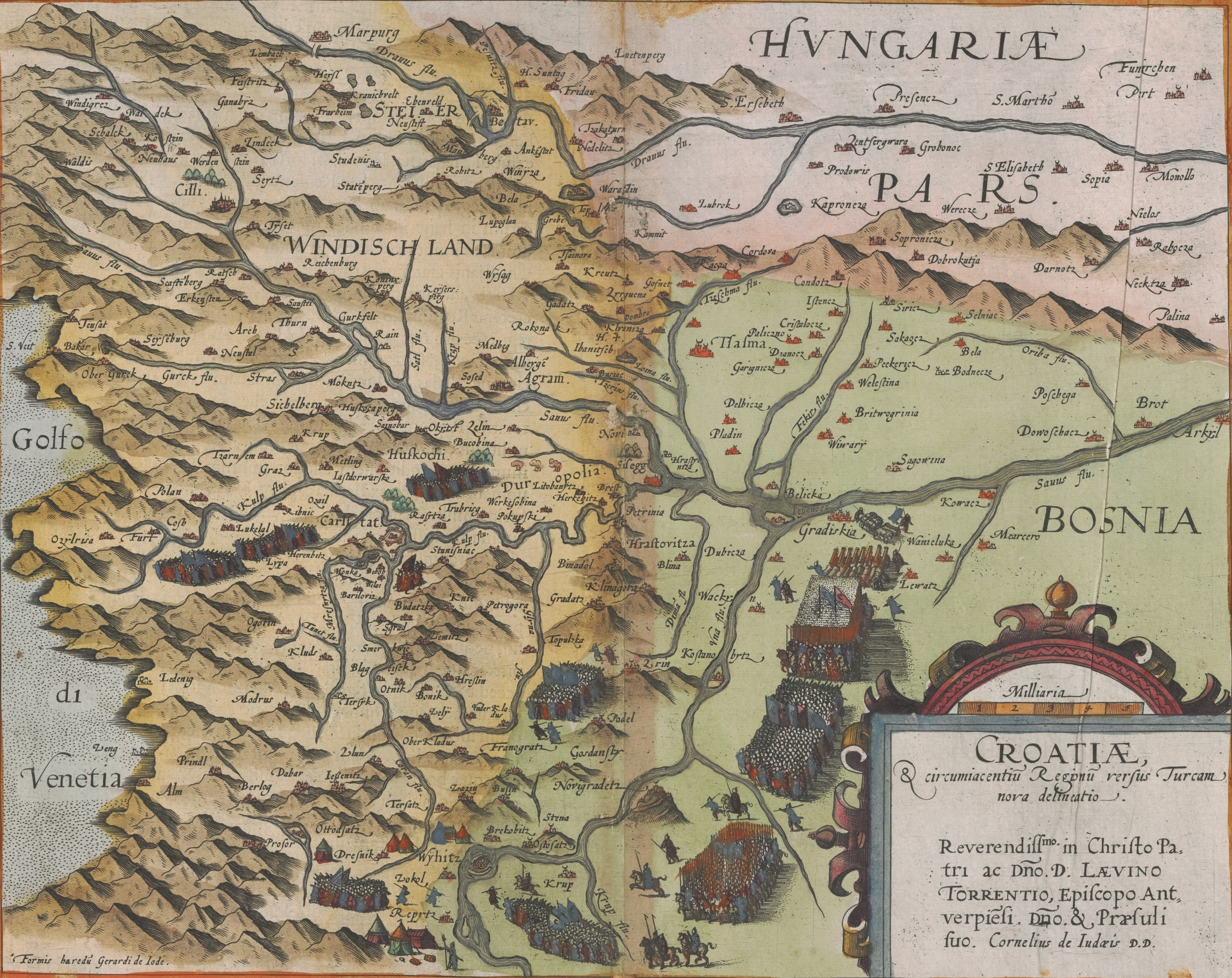
A 1590s map shows Zokol (Sokol) south of Wyhitz (Bihać) and north of Repytz (Ripač)

The oldest known document referring to Sokol is from 1395. In the 15th century, it was mentioned as part of the dynastic struggles in the medieval Kingdom of Hungary. When the Ottoman Empire expanded to the west, it was the site of several battles, before it fell to their rule together with Bihać in 1592. After that there are few mentions of it, it had a more minor garrison compared to the fort in the nearby Ripač.

The site was declared a national monument in 2008 and an assessment from 2010 declared its condition to be poor, and estimated the necessary repair costs at over 400,000 EUR.

== Sources ==
- Commission to Preserve National Monuments of Bosnia and Herzegovina (2008) [12 September 2007]. "Decision - The historic site of the prehistoric hillfort and the mediaeval and Ottoman fort of Sokolac in the village of Sokolac, Bihać Municipality". Official Gazette of Bosnia and Herzegovina (60/08).
- Mujadžić, Mirzet; Čobanov, Silvana; Mulalić Handan, Mirela (19 July 2010). "The historic site of a prehistoric hill fort and the mediaeval and Ottoman Sokolac Fort in the village of Sokolac, Municipality Bihać (BH_27)". Sarajevo: Commission to Preserve National Monuments of Bosnia and Herzegovina.
