= Habsburg–Ottoman wars in Hungary (1526–1568) =

Series of war between Habsburg Monarchy and Ottoman Empire in the years of 1526-1568

Habsburg–Ottoman wars in Hungary Little War in Hungary
- Part of the Ottoman–Habsburg wars
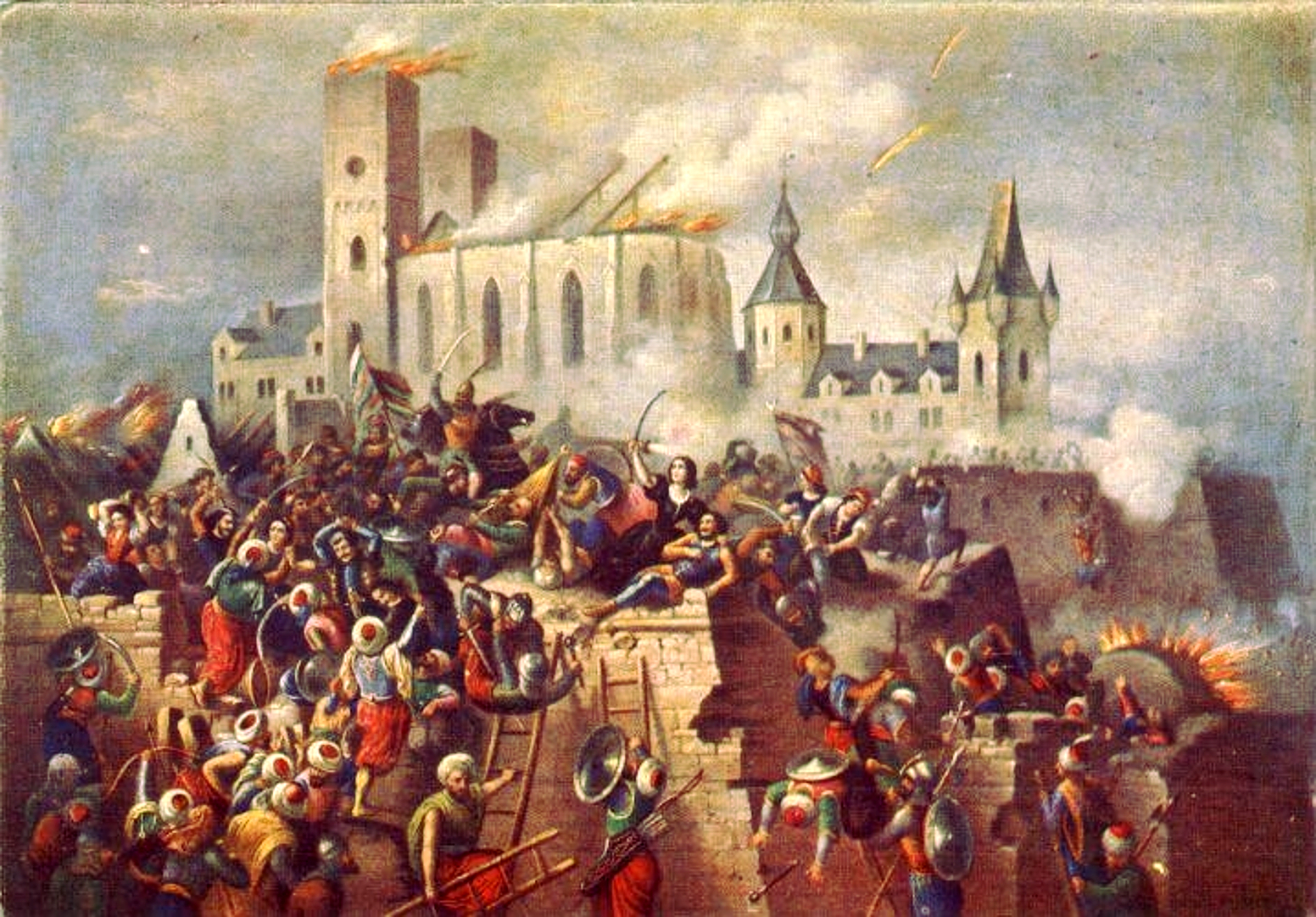
- Siege of Eger in 1552
Date	1526–1568
Location	Balkans, Kingdom of Hungary
Result	Ottoman victory
Territorial changes	Treaty of Frankfurt (1562): Ottomans conquer parts of Transylvania and Hungary; Majority of the former Kingdom of Hungary's with 1.8 million population annexed by the Habsburgs

Belligerents
Holy Roman Empire: Archduchy of Austria; Kingdom of Bohemia; Duchy of Styria; Duchy of Carniola; Royal Hungary; Kingdom of Croatia; Spanish Empire; Papal States	Ottoman Empire; John Szapolyai's Hungarian kingdom Kingdom of France

Commanders and leaders
Archduke Ferdinand I Ferrante I Gonzaga; Nikola Jurišić; Johann Katzianer; Lazarus von Schwendi (executed)	Suleiman the Magnificent; John Szapolyai; Christoph Frankopan †

The Habsburg monarchy and the Ottoman Empire waged a series of wars on the territory of the Kingdom of Hungary and several adjacent lands in Southeastern Europe from 1526 to 1568. The Habsburgs and the Ottomans engaged in a series of military campaigns against one another in Hungary between 1526 and 1568. While overall the Ottomans had the upper hand, the war failed to produce any decisive result. The Ottoman army remained very powerful in the open field but it often lost a significant amount of time besieging the many fortresses of the Hungarian frontier and its communication lines were now dangerously overstretched. At the end of the conflict, Hungary had been split into several different zones of control, between the Ottomans, Habsburgs, and Transylvania, nominally Ottoman vassal state. The simultaneous war of succession between Habsburg-controlled western "Royal Hungary" and the Zápolya-ruled pro-Ottoman "Eastern Hungarian Kingdom" is known as the Little War in Hungary.

== 1530s ==
Following Suleiman's unsuccessful siege of Vienna in 1529, Ferdinand I launched a counter-attack in 1530 to regain the initiative and avenge the destruction brought by Suleiman's 120,000-strong army.

Suleiman's response came in 1532 when he led a massive army of over 120,000 troops to besiege Vienna again. Ferdinand withdrew his army, leaving only 700 men with no cannons and a few guns to defend Güns (Kőszeg). In the siege of Güns, the Grand Vizier of the Ottomans, Ibrahim Pasha, did not realize how well defended Koszeg was. Nonetheless, under the leadership of Croatian Captain Nikola Jurišić, the city fought off every assault. The exact outcome of the battle is unknown since it has two versions that differ depending on the source. In the first version, Nikola Jurišić rejected the offer to surrender on favorable terms, and in the second version, the city was offered terms for a nominal surrender. In any case, the Ottomans withdrew at the arrival of the August rains. During their retreat, they suffered a defeat at the Battle of Leobersdorf against an imperial army led by Frederick II, Elector Palatine.

The Treaty of Constantinople (1533) was signed between Ferdinand and Suleiman. John Szapolyai was recognized as King of Hungary as an Ottoman vassal. However, the Ottomans recognized the land under the Habsburgs' rule in Hungary.

This treaty did not satisfy John Szapolyai or Ferdinand, whose armies began to skirmish along the borders. Ottoman sanjak-bey of Bosnia, Gazi Husrev-beg used the chance to occupy Požega in early 1537. Ferdinand, under pressure from the local nobility, decided to respond by launching an offensive in Slavonia in 1537, sending one of his ablest generals to take Osijek. The siege failed and led to the Battle of Gorjani, which was a disaster as big as Mohács, with an Ottoman relief army smashing the Austrians.

However, rather than attack Vienna again, Suleiman sent an army of 8,000 light cavalries to attack Otranto in southern Italy the same year. The troops were withdrawn from Italy after an expected French invasion designed to coordinate with Ottoman efforts failed to materialize. Nonetheless, an Ottoman victory at the naval Battle of Preveza in 1538 gave the Habsburg-led coalition another defeat.

== Maps ==
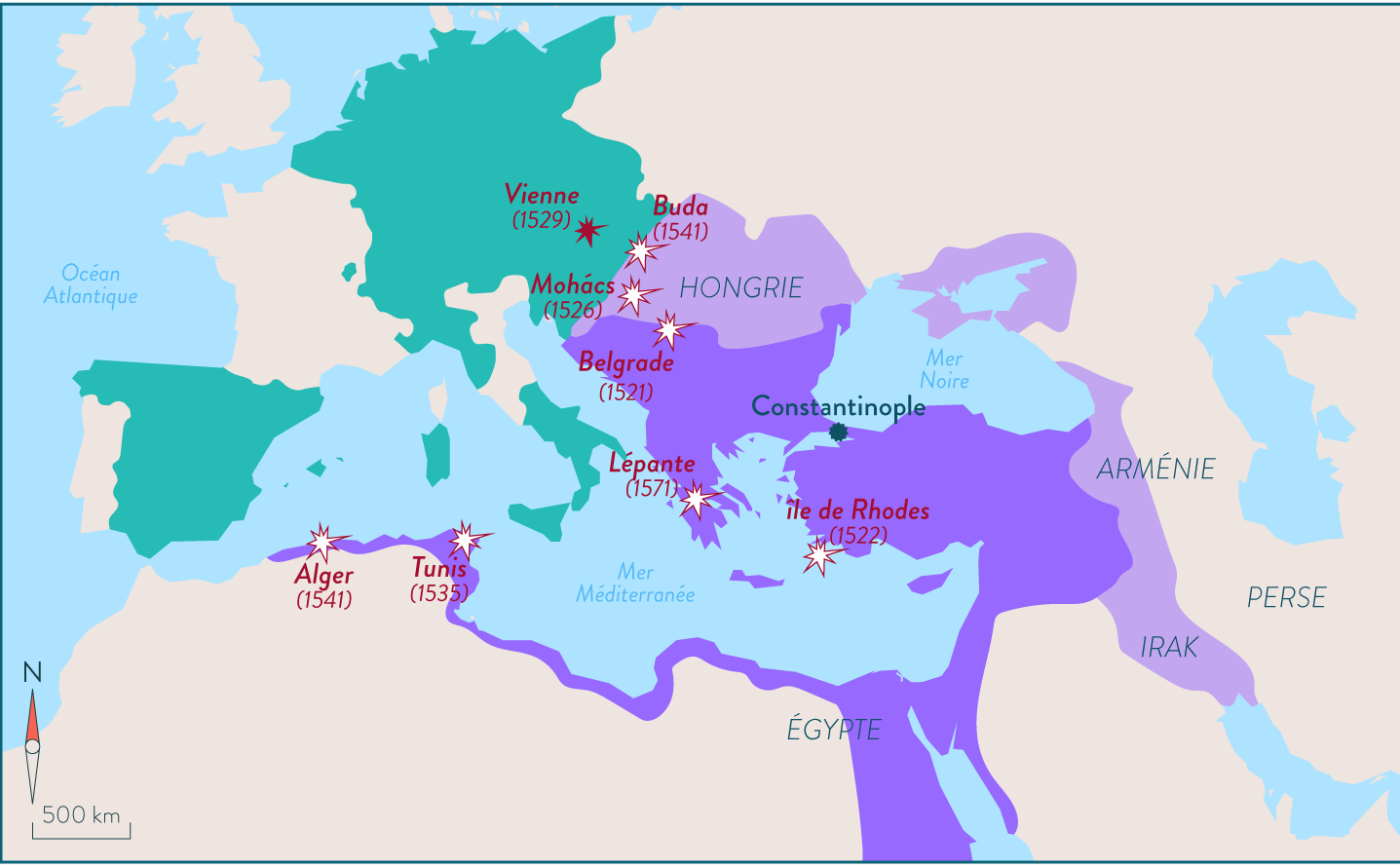
Ottoman-Habsburg (and Venetian) wars, 16th century

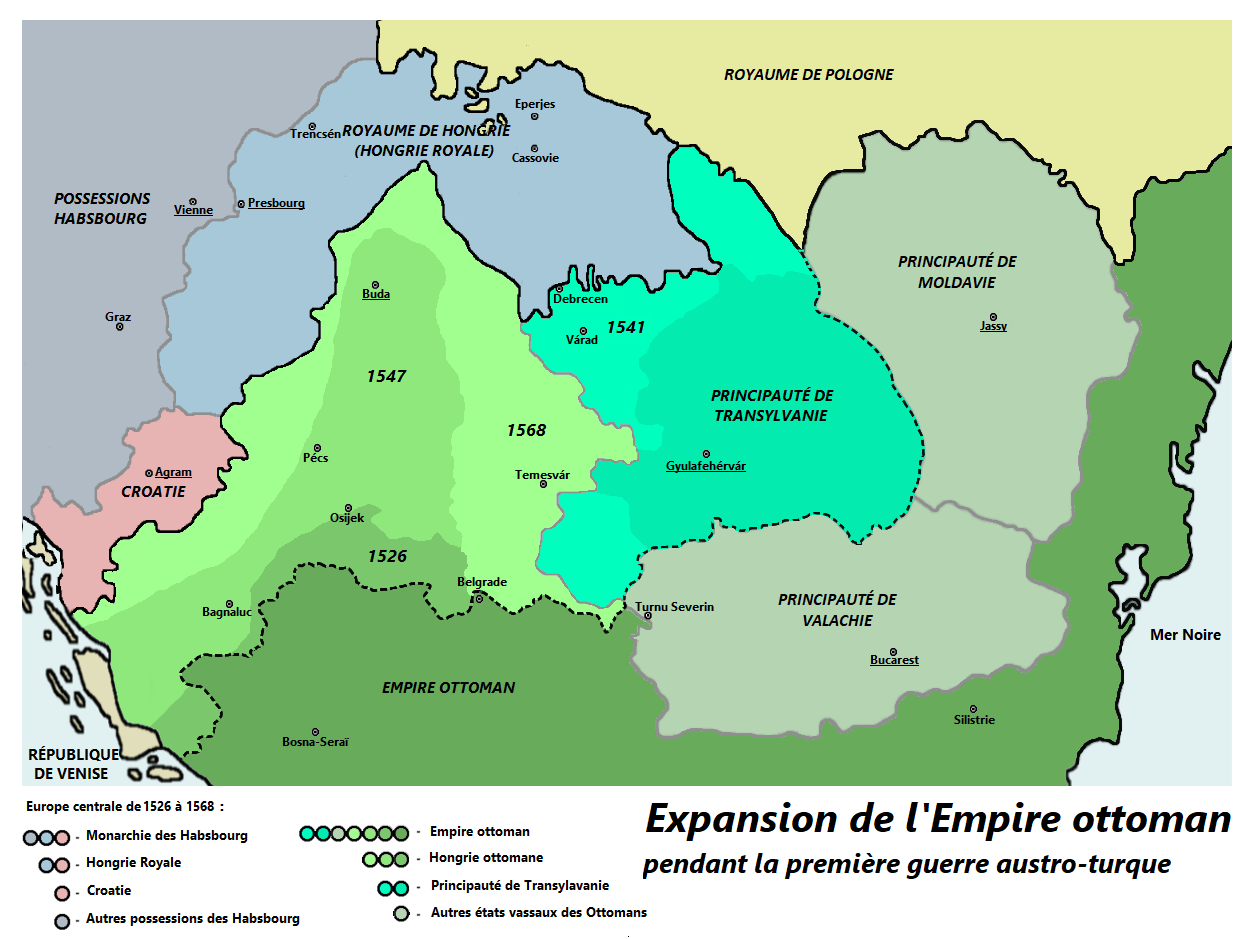
Expansion of the Ottoman Empire (1526-1568)

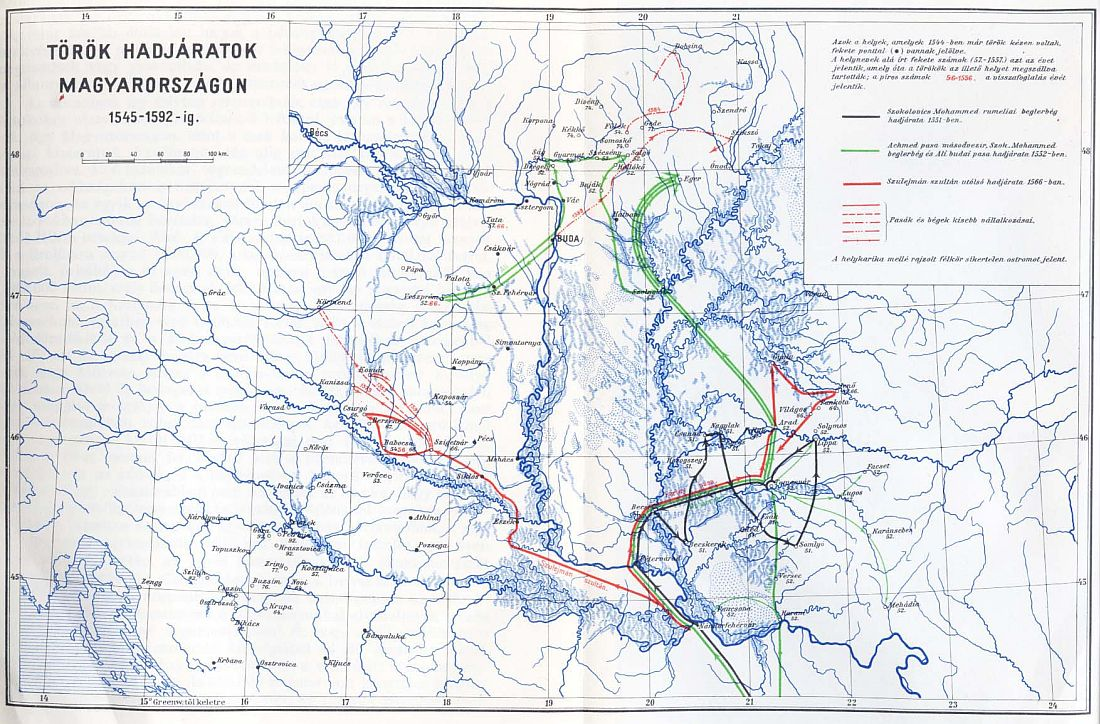
Ottoman wars in the territory of the Hungarian Kingdom against the Habsburg Empire, 1545-1592

== 1540s ==
In 1541, the Ottomans failed to take the fortress of Szigetvár. However, a humiliating defeat was inflicted on the Habsburgs in the siege of Buda (1541). John Szapolyai died in 1540 and his son was only a few weeks old. An Austrian attack on Buda followed the news of the death of John, but the appeals of John's widow to Suleiman were not unanswered, and in 1541 the elderly General Wilhelm von Roggendorf was defeated outside of Buda before he could even cross the Danube to take it. The next year Ferdinand besieged Pest but was repulsed.

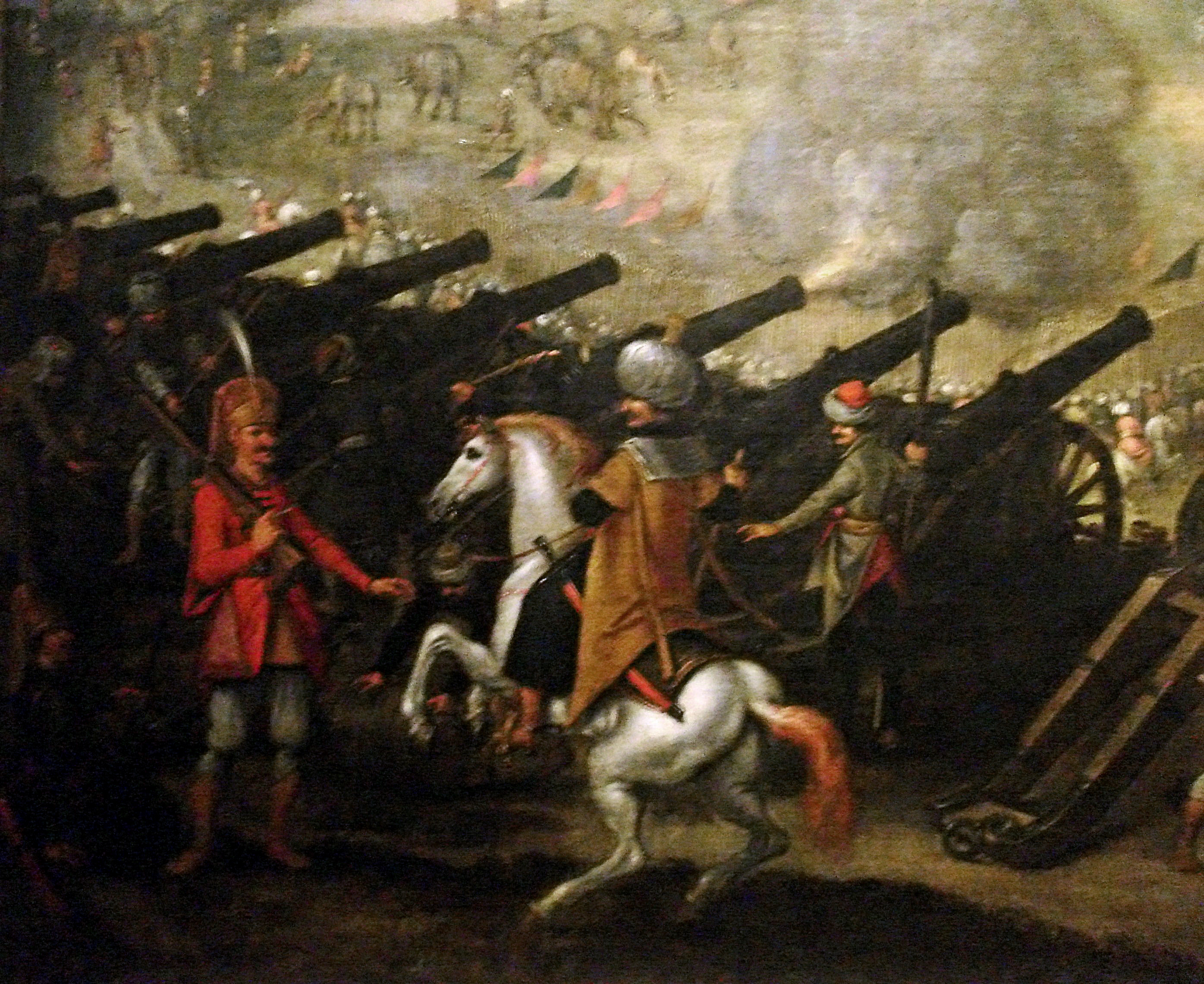
Ottoman cannon battery at the siege of Esztergom, 1543 (detail)

In April 1543 Suleiman launched another campaign in Hungary, bringing back Bran and other forts so that much of Hungary was under Ottoman control. As part of a Franco-Ottoman alliance (see also: Franco-Hungarian alliance and Petar Keglević), French troops were supplied to the Ottomans in Hungary; a French artillery unit was dispatched in 1543–1544 and attached to the Ottoman Army. In August 1543, the Ottoman succeeded in the siege of Esztergom The siege was followed by the capture of the Hungarian coronation city of Székesfehérvár in September 1543. Other cities that were captured during this campaign were Siklós and Szeged, in order to better protect Buda. However, continuous delay of the push toward the west, because of the siege of these fortresses, meant that the Ottomans could not launch any new offensive against Austria.

From 1548 to the end of the war, a Habsburg Spanish infantry tercio that had fought in the Schmalkaldic War, led by Maestre de campo Bernardo de Aldana, was detached in Hungary to fight against John Zápolya's supporters on behalf of Ferdinand. In fact, the Holy Roman Emperor Charles V sent Spanish troops to help his brother regularly from 1527 to 1553, support that proved instrumental in Hungary remaining inside Christianity.

== 1550s ==
=== Ottoman campaign in Hungary in 1552 ===
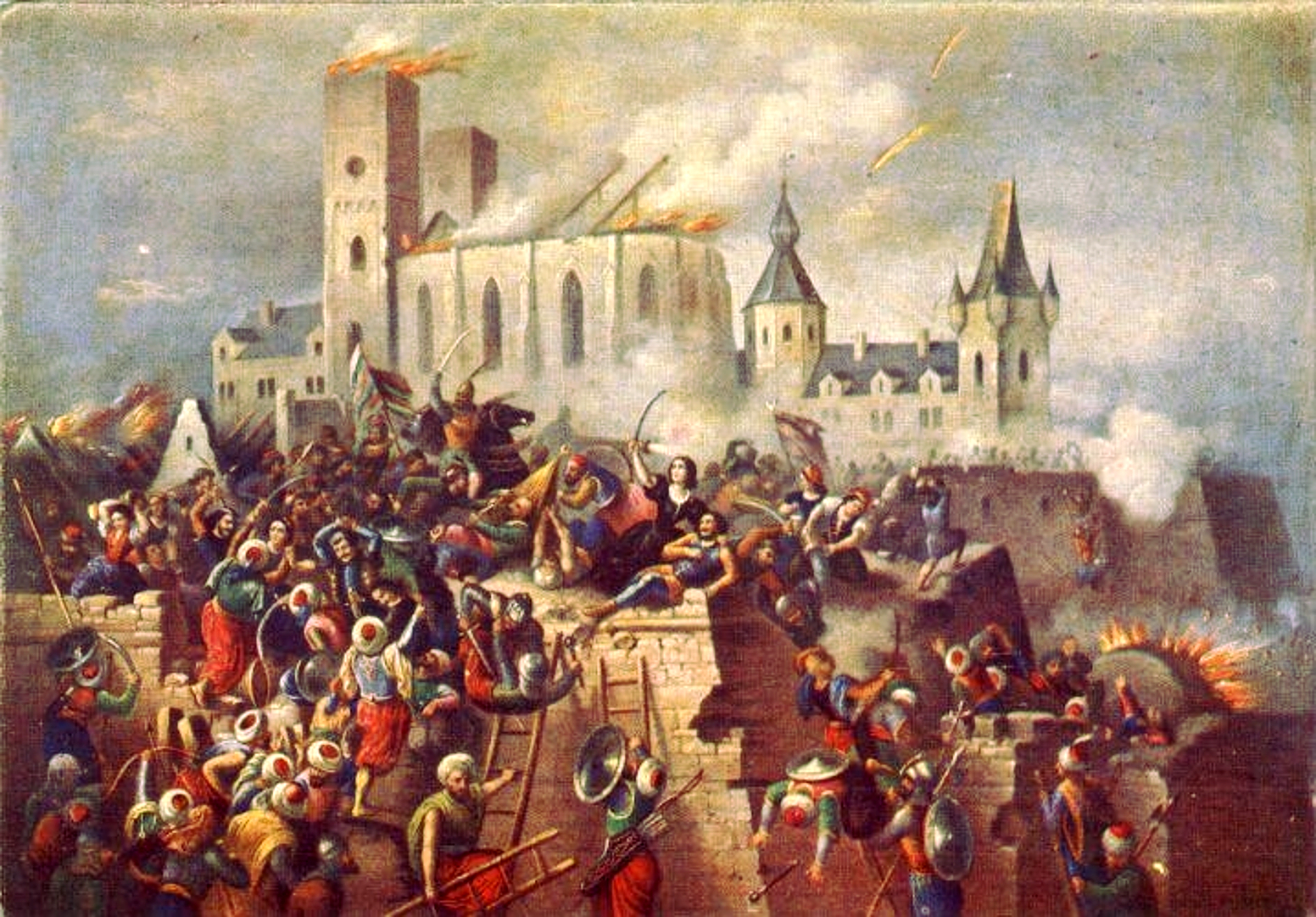
Siege of Eger Castle, 1552

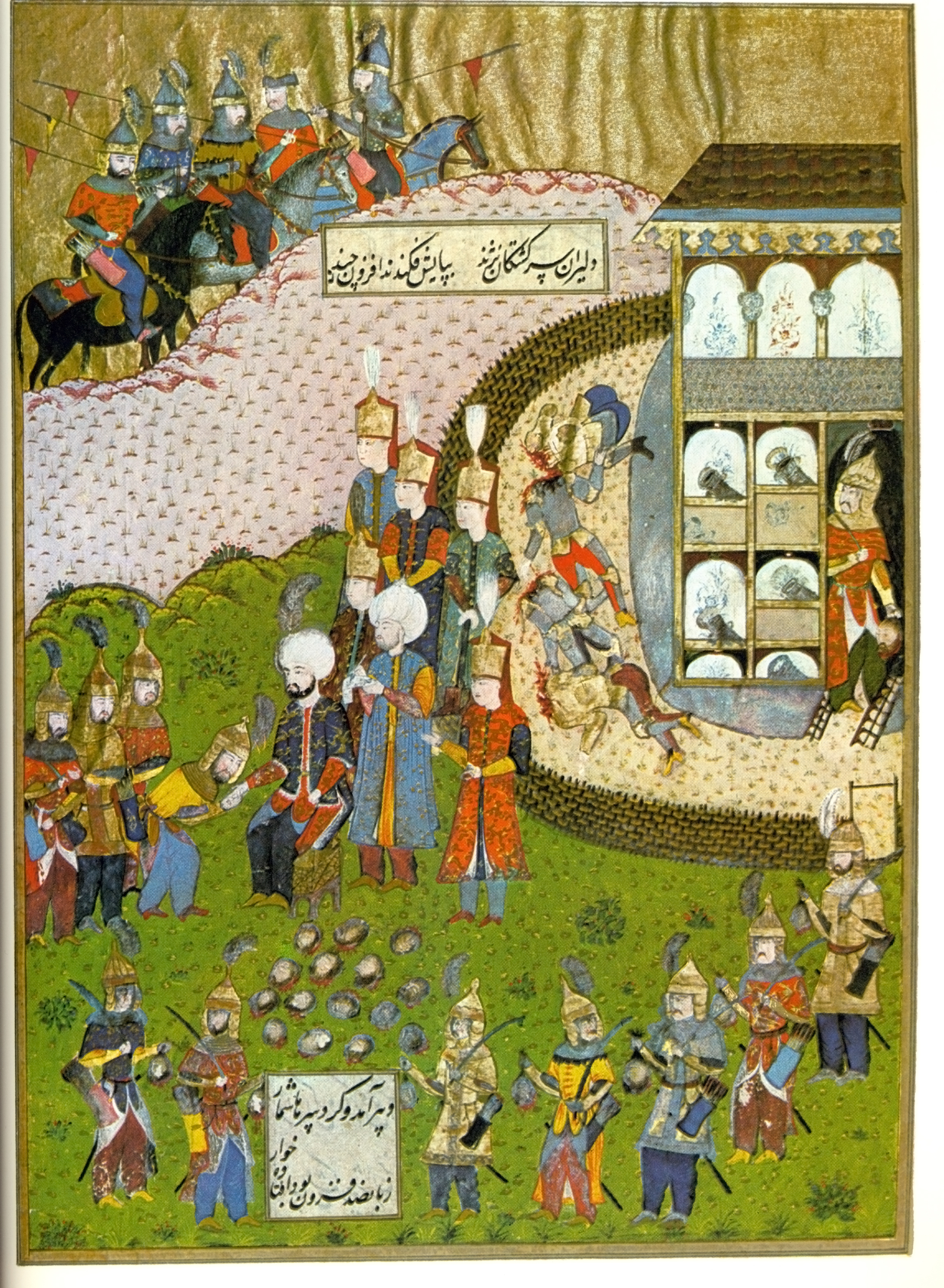
An ottoman miniature depicting the aftermath of capture of Temesvár in 1552

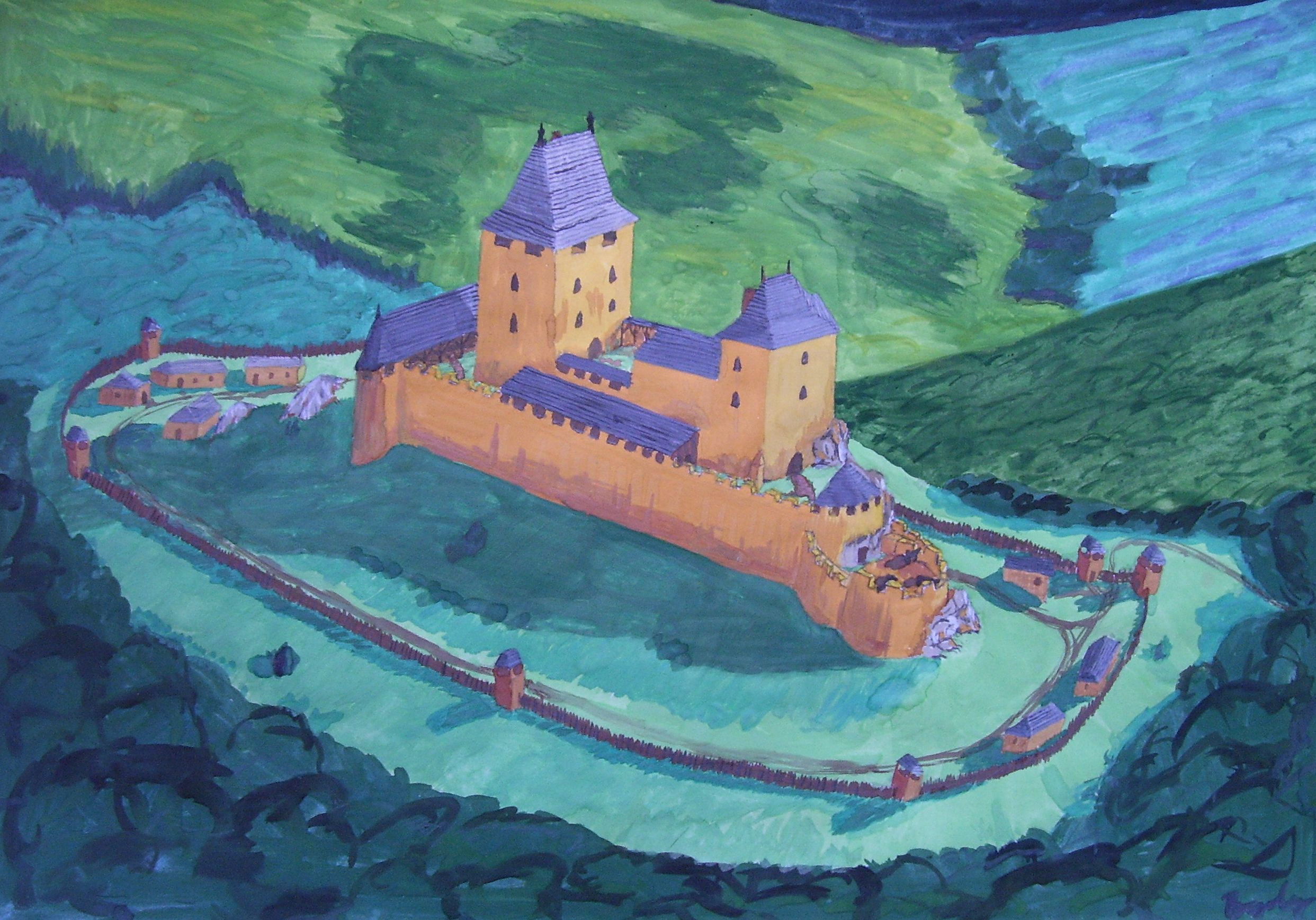
Drégely Castle was defended to the last man in 1552

In the spring of 1551, the Ottomans held the Hungarian border forts of Pécs, Fehérvár, Esztergom, Vác, Nógrád, Hatvan and Szeged. During the conquest campaign in 1551, the Turks were defeated by George the Frater at Timișoara (Temesvár) and Lippa, and the Sultan was outraged. This marked the end of the peace of Drinapolis (Erdine) in 1547. György Fráter deceived the sultan - in fact, he only wanted to gain time and finally hand over Transylvania, which had been under the rule of the Kingdom of Hungary since 1003, to the Hungarian king, Ferdinand of Habsburg.

Due to the Turkish threat, on the instructions of Ferdinand I, in 1550–51, on the site of the old Szolnok earthen castle, Szolnok was surrounded by a new city wall (partly according to the plan of István Dobó), and its weak castle was fortified. Lőrinc Nyáry was appointed to the forefront. This new strength did not fit into the Turkish plans to keep central Hungary. Suleyman's main goal was to make a bigger gap between the western part of Hungary and the Principality of Transylvania. For all this, Sultan Suleiman sent another conquering army against the politically divided Kingdom of Hungary. The commander-in-chief of his army, Kara Ahmed, who left Constantinople, was the serdar[general] and other commanders were Mehmed Sokollu beglerbey of Rumelia and Hadim Ali pasha r(governor) of Buda. The poorly paid mercenaries of King Ferdinand and the Hungarian population fled the Turkish armies. Several Hungarian castles were left to their fate without protection. Ahmed's army's aim was to acquire the Timisoara region, while Hadim Ali had to occupy the castles of Hont and Nógrád, thus securing the way to the rich mining towns of the highlands.

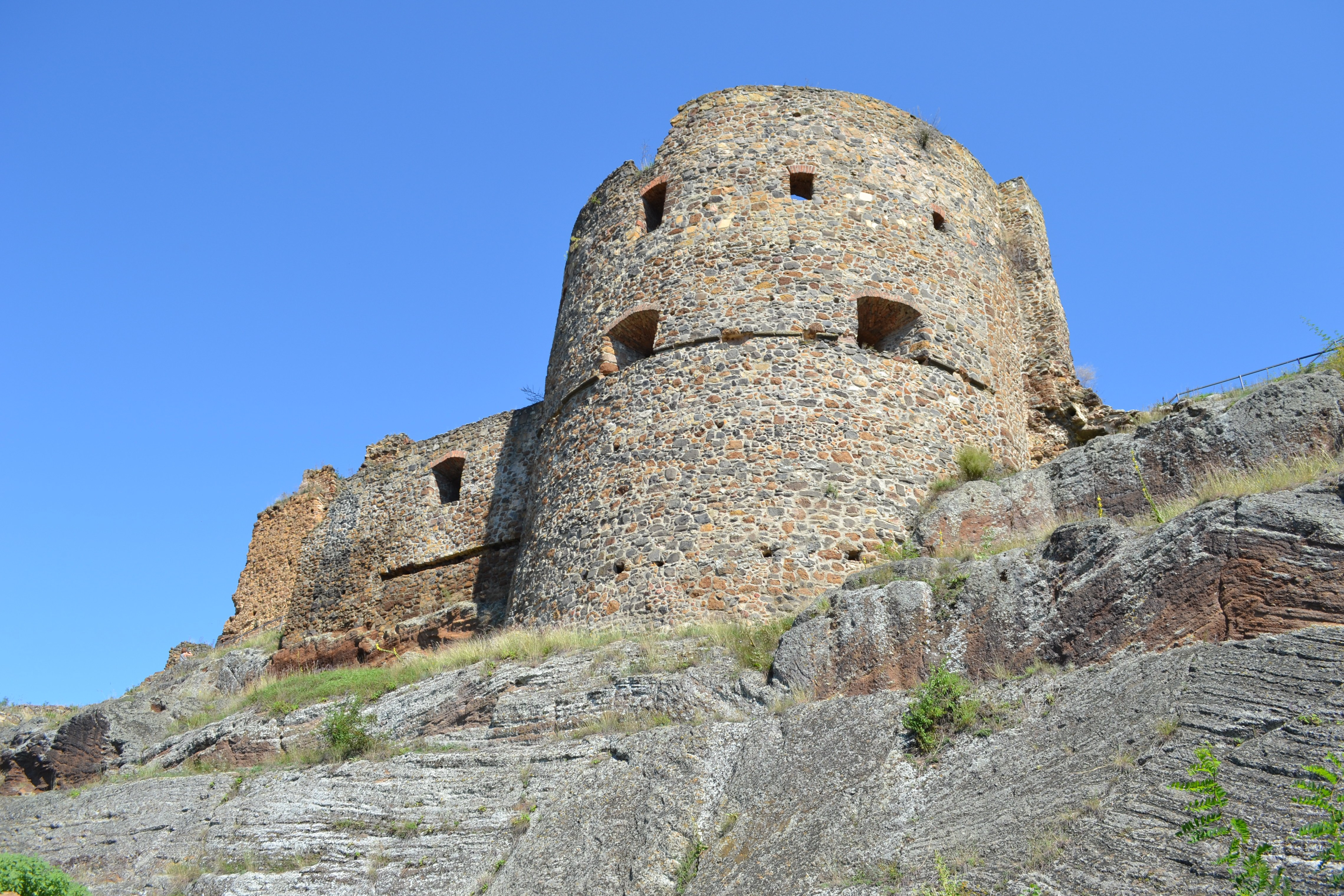
The Fiľakovo castle was a component of the defence line against the Ottoman expansion in the 16th century

In 1552 two Ottoman armies crossed the border into the Hungarian Kingdom. One of them – led by Hadim Ali Pasha – started a campaign against the western and central part of the country whilst the second army – led by Kara Ahmed Pasha – attacked the fortresses in the Banat region. Hadim Ali Pasha laid siege to the castle at Veszprém and captured it on 2 June. The army of Ali Pasha – about 10,000 to 12,000 strong – got below Drégely Castle on the morning of 6 July. The fall of Drégely started a chain of defeats of castles of Hont and Nógrád counties. Ottoman troops conquered nine-tenths of the castles in the two counties in short order. During the campaign they occupied Timișoara, Veszprém, Szécsény, Hollókő, Buják, Lippa, Lugos, Karánsebes, Drégely and several smaller fortresses. Pasha Hadim Ali marched from Buda and Vizier Kara Ahmed marched from the West side of Transylvania (Partium). The Habsburg army under Erasmus von Teufel made a belated attempt to stop the Ottoman troops at Plášťovce (then Palást), but was completely defeated in a two-day battle of Palást, and 4,000 German and Italian prisoners were deported to Istanbul. The two armies united under Szolnok, then besieged and conquered the Szolnok Castle, and turned against the gate of Upper Hungary, Eger. At the end of the July there was an enormous gap in the Hungarian border castle system.

In 1552, Suleiman's united forces (Kara Ahmed pasha, Hadim Ali pasha, and Mehmed Sokollu beglerbey) laid siege of Eger, located in the northern part of the Kingdom of Hungary, but the defenders led by István Dobó repelled the attacks and defended the Eger Castle.

In 1554, the town of Fiľakovo in south-central Slovakia with the castle of the same name was conquered by the Turks and was the seat of a sanjak until 1593, when it was reconquered by the Imperial troops. On 27 March 1562, Hasszán, the sanjak-bey of Fülek (Fiľakovo) castle, defeated the Hungarian army of the Upper Lands at the battle of Szécsény.

=== Siege of Szigetvar 1556 ===
The Ottoman armies advancing in Transdanubia managed to occupy all the surrounding fortresses in the years 1540-1550, so Szigetvár was completely left alone. After the Turkish attack, led by Toygun Pasha, governor of Buda, was repulsed by László Kerecsényi in 1555, the first full-scale siege of the fortress took place in the summer of 1556. Despite the extraordinary efforts of the Ottomans the castellan in charge of the defense, Marko Horvat Stančić [hr], kept the fortress against the multiple attacks led by Ali Pasha, governor of Buda.

While Szigetvár was besieged, on July 18, a Habsburg army besieged the Ottoman fort at Babócsa, on the west side of the Rinya River, 45 km west of Szigetvár. The commanders were Hungarian Palatine Tamás Nádasdy and Croatian Ban Nikola IV Zrinski. Ali Paşa knew that for Süleymân, losing a fort under Ottoman control is a bigger sin than failing to take one. Ali Paşa temporarily lifted the siege and took his men to Babócsa, to rescue the garrison but, on July 23-24, at a battle at the Rinya River, Nikola Zrinski defeated Ali Paşa, who then returned to Szigetvár, which, during his absence, had damaged walls repaired and the garrison reinvigorated. The Ottomans lifted the siege and left Szigetvár - chased and attacked while they fled.

==== Aftermath ====
The castle, damaged during the siege, was rebuilt under the leadership of the captain and with the involvement of the Italian military engineer Pietro Ferrabosco, using the most modern military techniques, as a result of which it became the most modern and strongest border fortress in Hungary by the end of the 1550s, protected by a rampart wall, corner bastions, and moats.

== 1560s ==
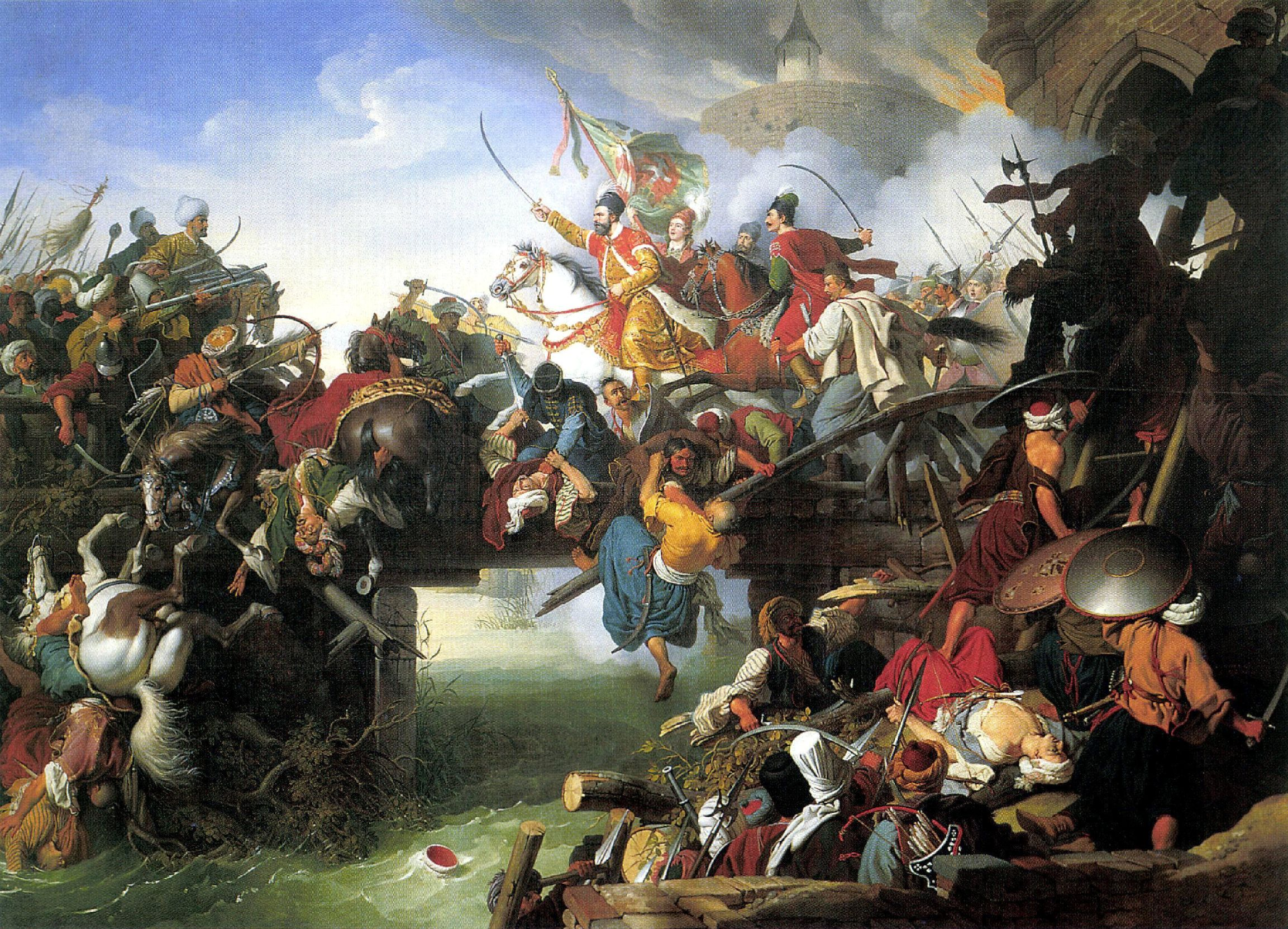
The siege of Szigetvár ended with every remaining member of the garrison in a suicidal charge from the fortress led by Nikola IV Zrinski on 7 September 1566

After the death of Márk Horváth, in 1561 Nikola IV Zrinski became the castle captain. He was tasked with maintaining the last important southern border fortress, still in imperial hands, endangering the security of the military and commercial road between Buda and Nándorfehérvár. After a few years of silence, the battle of Szigetvár took place in the late summer of 1566, which ended in the abandonment of Southern Transdanubia, surpassing all its significance and leaving a deep imprint in Hungarian historical memory, and ending in defeat despite the heroic endurance of the defenders. Sultan Suleiman I started his last campaign and he set Szigetvár as his first goal. He besieged the castle of Szigetvár with an army of 100,000 regular forces, which Zrinski defended with about 2,500 soldiers, resisting the Turkish superiority for 34 days. On September 7, 1566, when the inner castle was already on fire, Zrinski and his 300 combat soldiers tried to erupt ("Zrinski's charge"), but all of them died a heroic death at the castle gate. During the siege, the medieval round tower was also destroyed. Immediately after the occupation of the castle, the Ottomans began to rebuild the fortress and the settlement.

After Suleiman died, Mehmed Sokollu hid it from the army for a month and sent a secret letter to prince Selim to take over the throne. The soldiers didn't know that Suleiman died until Selim joined the army in Belgrade. The army supported him to be the successor of Suleiman.

== Aftermath ==
Peace was finally concluded in Edirne in 1568 and renewed in 1576, 1584, and 1591. War would not again break out between the Habsburgs and Ottomans until 1593, in the Long Turkish War. However, throughout this period of peace small-scale warfare continued, a conflict known as the "Little War" (German: Kleinkrieg). No large armies or sustained campaigns were launched, but authorities on both sides continually struggled with hostile raiders and forays across the poorly-demarcated border. Both sides, however, desired that peace continue.

In 1571 the Turks destroyed the Hodejov castle and in 1575 they conquered the Modrý Kameň castle. In 1588 there was a battle near the town of Szikszó, where the Hungarian army defeated the Turks.

== See also ==
- Military Frontier
- Ottoman wars in Europe
- List of campaigns of Suleiman the Magnificent

== Sources ==
- Ćirković, Sima (2004). The Serbs. Malden: Blackwell Publishing. ISBN 9781405142915.
- Fodor, Pál; Dávid, Géza, eds. (2000). Ottomans, Hungarians, and Habsburgs in Central Europe: The Military Confines in the Era of Ottoman Conquest. BRILL. ISBN 9004119078.
- Tracy, James (2016). Balkan Wars: Habsburg Croatia, Ottoman Bosnia, and Venetian Dalmatia, 1499–1617. Malden: Rowman & Littlefield. ISBN 9781442213609.
- Tracy, James. "The Road to Szigetvár: Ferdinand I's Defense of His Hungarian Border, 1548–1566". Austrian History Yearbook 44 (2013): 17–36.
- Turnbull, Stephen R. (2003). The Ottoman Empire 1326–1699. New York: Osprey Publishing. ISBN 1-84176-569-4.
