= 1538 =

1538 in various calendars
- Gregorian calendar: 1538; MDXXXVIII
- Ab urbe condita: 2291
- Armenian calendar: 987; ԹՎ ՋՁԷ
- Assyrian calendar: 6288
- Balinese saka calendar: 1459–1460
- Bengali calendar: 944–945
- Berber calendar: 2488
- English Regnal year: 29 Hen. 8 – 30 Hen. 8
- Buddhist calendar: 2082
- Burmese calendar: 900
- Byzantine calendar: 7046–7047
- Chinese calendar: 丁酉年 (Fire Rooster); 4235 or 4028 — to — 戊戌年 (Earth Dog); 4236 or 4029
- Coptic calendar: 1254–1255
- Discordian calendar: 2704
- Ethiopian calendar: 1530–1531
- Hebrew calendar: 5298–5299
- Hindu calendars
- Vikram Samvat: 1594–1595
- Shaka Samvat: 1459–1460
- Kali Yuga: 4638–4639
- Holocene calendar: 11538
- Igbo calendar: 538–539
- Iranian calendar: 916–917
- Islamic calendar: 944–945
- Japanese calendar: Tenbun 7 (天文７年)
- Javanese calendar: 1456–1457
- Julian calendar: 1538; MDXXXVIII
- Korean calendar: 3871
- Minguo calendar: 374 before ROC 民前374年
- Nanakshahi calendar: 70
- Thai solar calendar: 2080–2081
- Tibetan calendar: མེ་མོ་བྱ་ལོ་ (female Fire-Bird); 1664 or 1283 or 511 — to — ས་ཕོ་ཁྱི་ལོ་ (male Earth-Dog); 1665 or 1284 or 512

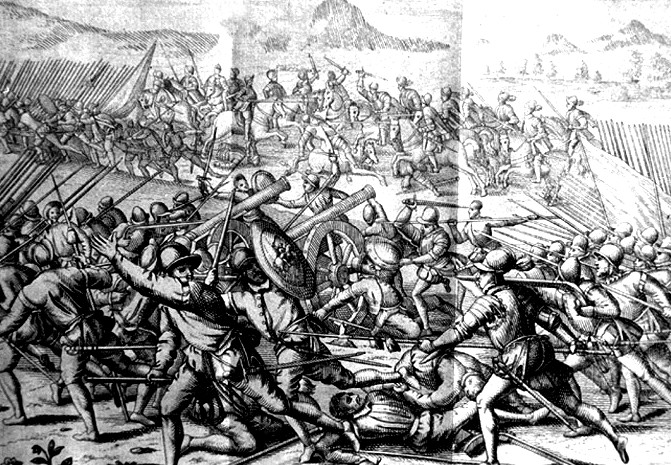
April 26: The Battle of Las Salinas is fought in Peru

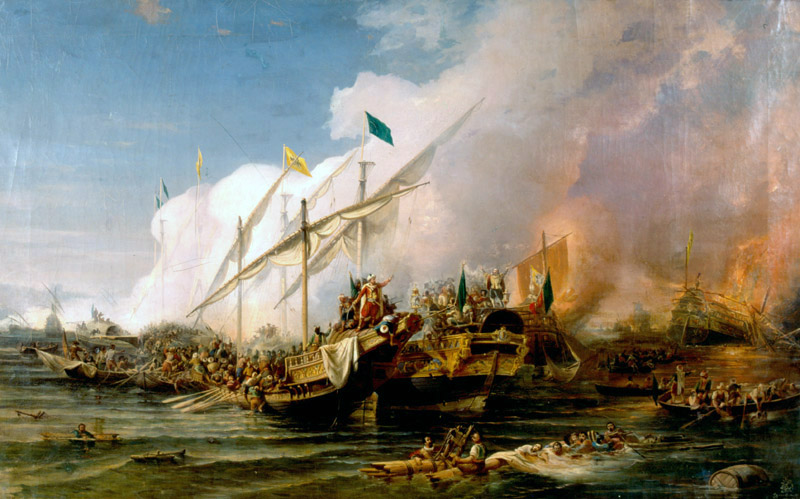
September 28: The Ottoman Empire defeats Europe's Holy League in the Battle of Preveza

Year 1538 (MDXXXVIII) was a common year starting on Tuesday of the Julian calendar.

== Events ==
=== January–March ===
- January 14 – Leonard Grey, England's Lord Deputy of Ireland, successfully negotiates a truce in the semi-independent County Laois, formerly an Irish Kingdom, over the areas leadership. between Peter O'Moore and Rory Lysaght.
- January 31 – General Johann Katzianer of the Holy Roman Empire, on trial in Vienna for the disastrous Imperial campaign against the Ottoman Empire and for desertion during the Battle of Gorjani, escapes and flees to Kostajnica Fortress in Ottoman-controlled Croatia. After 14 months, Nikola IV Zrinski has Katzianer murdered.
- February 8 – The Holy League, an alliance of Christian nations (the Papal States and the Republic of Venice, the Knights Hospitaller of Malta, Spain and the Spanish-ruled Viceroyalty of Naples and Sicily), is agreed upon under the direction of Pope Paul III and Venetian Senator Alvise Badoer.
- February 24 – Treaty of Nagyvárad: Peace is declared between Ferdinand I, future Holy Roman Emperor and the Ottoman Empire. John Zápolya is recognized as King of Hungary (Eastern Hungarian Kingdom), while Ferdinand retains the northern and western parts of the Kingdom, and is recognized as heir to the throne.
- March 18 – Garcia de Noronha is appointed as the new Governor-General of Portuguese India by King João III. He sails to Goa and arrives less than three weeks later.

=== April–June ===
- April 6 – In India, Sher Shah Suri, who had been the Mughal Empire's Governor of the Bihar Subah province, declares the founding of the Sur Empire and crowns himself as Emperor in a ceremony at Delhi.
- April 26 – Battle of Las Salinas: In Peru, Almagro is defeated by Francisco Pizarro, who then seizes Cusco.
- May 9 – Mary of Guise is wed by proxy to King James V of Scotland, while she is at the Château de Châteaudun and he is in London, with neither of the two seeing each other.
- May 10 – In India Mahmud Khan, 11-year-old the nephew of the late Sultan Bahadur Shah, is enthroned as Mahmud Shah III, Sultan of Gujarat.
- May 27 – A joint delegation of Lutherans from various German cities arrives in England for meetings with King Henry VIII; Thomas Cranmer, Archbishop of Canterbury; and Thomas Cromwell, the former Chief Minister of England.
- June 18 –
  - Truce of Nice: Peace is declared between Emperor Charles V and Francis I of France.
  - The formal wedding of Mary of Guise and King James V of Scotland takes place at St Andrews Cathedral.
- June 19 – Dissolution of the monasteries in England: The newly founded Bisham Abbey is dissolved.

=== July–September ===
- July 17 – The betrothal ceremony of 12-year-old Princess Elisabeth, niece of Charles V, Holy Roman Emperor to the 17-year-old Prince Sigismund II Augustus, son of King Sigismund of Poland (who is also the Grand Duke of Lithuania) and heir to the throne, takes place in Innsbruck. The two are married five years later on May 5, 1543.
- July 25 – The city of Guayaquil, now the largest city in the South American nation of Ecuador is founded by Spanish conqueror Francisco de Orellana in the location of a Quechua native village of the same name. Orellana names the city "Santiago de Guayaquil".
- August 6 – Bogotá, Colombia is founded by Gonzalo Jiménez de Quesada.
- September 18 – Ştefan V Lăcustă of the Bogdan-Musat dynasty in Romania is appointed as the new Prince of Moldavia by the Ottoman Sultan Suleiman, replacing uncle, Petru Rareș.
- September 28 – Battle of Preveza: The Ottoman fleet of Suleiman the Magnificent, under the command of Hayreddin Barbarossa, defeats the Holy League of Emperor Charles V, under the command of Andrea Doria.
- September 29– The last significant volcanic eruption in the Phlegraean Fields of Italy begins and lasts one week.

=== October–December ===
- October 6 – The eruption the Italian volcano ends after seven days, having created Monte Nuovo.
- October 28 – The first university of the New World, the Universidad Santo Tomás de Aquino, is founded on the island of Hispaniola in Santo Domingo.
- November 5 – The siege of the Indian city of Diu ends as the Gujarat and Ottoman forces withdraw from the Portuguese held city.
- November 30
  - Sucre, Bolivia, is founded under the name Ciudad de la Plata de la Nueva Toledo.
  - Dissolution of the Monasteries in England: Byland Abbey is dissolved.
- December 17 – Pope Paul III confirms the excommunication of Henry VIII of England from the Roman Catholic church.

=== Date unknown ===
- Michelangelo starts work on the Piazza del Campidoglio on the Capitoline Hill in Rome.
- The first in a decade-long series of severe famines and epidemics sweep central and southeastern China during the Ming dynasty, made worse by a decision of 1527 to cut back on the intake of grain quotas for granaries.
- In China, a tsunami floods over the seawall in Haiyan County of Zhejiang province, inundating fields with saltwater, ruining many acres of crops. This drives up the price of foodstuffs, and many are forced to live off of tree bark and weeds (as Wang Wenlu states in his writing of 1545).

== Births ==
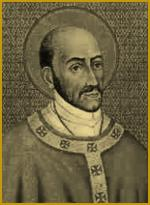
Saint Turibius of Mongrovejo

- January 6 – Jane Dormer, English lady-in-waiting to Mary I (d. 1612)
- January 10 – Louis of Nassau, Dutch general (d. 1574)
- January 13 – Udai Singh of Marwar, Ruler of Marwar (d. 1595)
- January 15 – Maeda Toshiie, Japanese samurai and warlord (d. 1599)
- January 16 – John Frederick III, Duke of Saxony and nominal Duke of Saxe-Gotha (d. 1565)
- February 23 – Dorothy Catherine of Brandenburg-Ansbach (d. 1604)
- March 25 – Christopher Clavius, German mathematician and astronomer (d. 1612)
- April 24 – Guglielmo Gonzaga, Duke of Mantua (d. 1587)
- April 26 – Gian Paolo Lomazzo, Italian painter (d. 1600)
- June 30 – Bonaventura Vulcanius, Flemish Renaissance humanist (d. 1614)
- July 12 – Infanta Maria of Guimarães, Portuguese infanta (d. 1577)
- July 28 – Alberto Bolognetti, Italian Catholic cardinal (d. 1585)
- September 29
  - Count Johan II of East Frisia (d. 1591)
  - Joan Terès i Borrull, Viceroy of Catalonia (d. 1603)
- October 2 – Saint Charles Borromeo, Spanish saint and cardinal of the Roman Catholic Church (d. 1584)
- October 17 – Irene di Spilimbergo, Italian Renaissance poet and painter (d. 1559)
- November 16 – Saint Turibius of Mongrovejo, Spanish Grand Inquisitor, missionary Archbishop of Lima (d. 1606)
- June 12 – Francesco Gonzaga, Spanish Catholic cardinal (d. 1566)
- July 25 – Diane de France, illegitimate daughter of Henry II of France (d. 1619)
- December 8 – Miklós Istvánffy, Hungarian politician (d. 1615)
- December 10 – Giovanni Battista Guarini, Italian poet (d. 1612)
- December 11 – Sigismund of Brandenburg, Archbishop of Magdeburg, Administrator of Halberstadt (d. 1566)
- December 13 – Sigrid Sture, Swedish Governor (d. 1613)
- December 19 – Jan Zborowski, Polish noble (d. 1603)
- December 21 – Luigi d'Este, Italian Catholic cardinal (d. 1586)
- date unknown
  - François de Bar, French scholar (d. 1606)
  - Henry Herbert, 2nd Earl of Pembroke, Welsh-born statesman (d. 1601)
  - Ashikaga Yoshihide, Japanese shōgun (d. 1568)
  - Caesar Baronius, Italian cardinal and historian (d. 1607)
  - Lewis Mordaunt, 3rd Baron Mordaunt, English Member of Parliament (d. 1601)

== Deaths ==
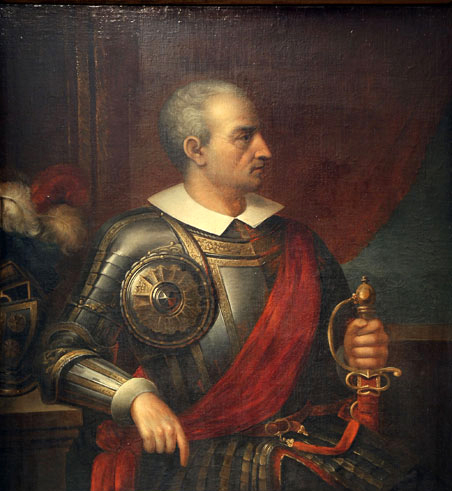
Diego de Almagro

- January 8 – Beatrice of Portugal, Duchess of Savoy (b. 1504)
- February 3 – John III of the Palatinate, Administrator of the Bishopric of Regensburg (b. 1488)
- February 7 – Olav Engelbrektsson, Archbishop of Norway (born c. 1480).
- February 12 – Albrecht Altdorfer, German painter (b. c. 1480)
- March 18 – Érard de La Marck, prince-bishop of Liège (b. 1472)
- April 3 – Elizabeth Boleyn, Countess of Wiltshire (b. 1480)
- April 4 – Elena Glinskaya, Regent of Russia (b. c. 1510)
- May 8 – Edward Foxe, English churchman (b. 1496)
- May 15 – Philipp III, Count of Hanau-Lichtenberg (b. 1482)
- May 22 – John Forest, English Franciscan friar (martyred) (b. 1471)
- June 22 – Bodo VIII, Count of Stolberg-Wernigerode (1511–1538) (b. 1467)
- June 30 – Charles II, Duke of Guelders (b. 1467)
- July 8 – Diego de Almagro, Spanish conquistador (b. 1475)
- September 14 – Henry III of Nassau-Breda, Baron of Breda (b. 1483)
- September 28 – Mary of Bourbon, daughter of Charles, Duke of Vendôme (b. 1515)
- October 20 – Francesco Maria I della Rovere, Duke of Urbino, condottiero (b. 1490)
- November 22 – John Lambert, English Protestant martyr (burned at stake)
- December 28 – Andrea Gritti, Doge of Venice (b. 1455)
- date unknown
  - Pierre Gringoire, French poet and playwright (b. 1475)
  - Isabella Hoppringle, Scottish abbess and spy (b. 1460)
  - Paganino Paganini, Italian publisher (b. c. 1450)
