= Battle of Tarcal =

1527 battle in Hungary

- Part of the Hungarian campaign of 1527–1528
Date	27 September 1527
Location	Tarcal, near Tokaj, in Hungary
Result	Habsburg victory

Belligerents
Eastern Hungarian Kingdom; Serbs	Habsburg monarchy; Holy Roman Empire; Hungarian Slovenes; Habsburg-party Hungarians

Commanders and leaders
John Zápolya; Ferenc Bodó; Lukács Kismarjai †; Pavle Bakić	Archduke Ferdinand of Austria; Niklas Graf Salm; Bálint Török; Johann Katzianer

Strength
7,000–8,000	18,000

Casualties and losses
5,000	Minimal

The Battle of Tarcal or Battle of Tokaj (Hungarian: Tarcali csata) was fought on 27 September 1527 near Tokaj between the Habsburg-German-Hungarian forces of Archduke Ferdinand of Austria and an opposing Hungarian army under the command of John Zápolya. Ferdinand defeated Zápolya.

== Background ==
In 1526, King Louis II of Hungary was killed at the Battle of Mohács. The Hungarian Diet elected Zápolya as their new king. Archduke (and future Holy Roman Emperor) Ferdinand also claimed the crown, and was elected by a rump Diet. This conflict resulted in war between the rivals. In 1527, Ferdinand invaded Hungary and captured Buda while Zápolya was distracted by a peasant uprising. Zápolya quickly turned to meet Ferdinand, but could only bring limited forces to the field.

== The battle ==
Zápolya's army numbered around 7,000–8,000 men, drawn mainly from eastern Hungary, Transylvania, and Serbia. Ferdinand's army numbered 18,000 men, mostly German mercenaries, but also some of his western Hungarian supporters. 6,000 were under the command of Niklas Graf Salm and Bálint Török. On 26 September Zápolya encamped near Tokaj. Ferdinand's forces engaged with, and defeated a small Zápolya contingent in a skirmish near Sajólád.

On 27 September, Zápolya attacked Ferdinand's main force, bringing on a full-scale battle. Ferdinand's left-flank troops (from Styria) overwhelmed the Serbian troops of Zápolya's right wing, while German and Austrian mercenaries swept through Zápolya's cavalry. Ferdinand's Hungarian hussars then broke through Zápolya's center, seized his camp, and drove his remaining soldiers to the river Tisza.

== Aftermath ==
According to a report, estimated by Pál Fodor to be from November 1527, from voivode of Moldavia Petru Rareș to the Ottoman court, Zápolya retreated to Kolosvar, from which he was driven to Tasnád by Transvlvanian forces and Székelys. Aided by Sigismund I the Old, he raised a new army then marching toward Buda to again engage Ferdinand. At the Battle of Szina Ferdinand once again defeated Zápolya, who fled to the Crown of the Kingdom of Poland. Zápolya allied with the Ottoman sultan, Suleiman the Magnificent; after two failed assaults on Vienna in 1529 and 1533, Ferdinand signed a peace treaty delineating his western domain and Zápolya's eastern one.

== Sources ==
- Szilágyi, Sándor. A Magyar Nemzet Története' ("History of the Hungarian Nation")
- Liptai, Ervin (editor). Military History of Hungary Budapest: Zrínyi Military Publisher (1985) ISBN 978-963-326-337-2
