= Battle of Szina =

1528 battle in Europe

- Part of the Hungarian campaign of 1527–1528
| Date | 20 March 1528 |
| Location | near Szina, Eastern Hungarian Kingdom (present-day Seňa, Slovakia) |
| Result | Habsburg victory |

Belligerents
| Eastern Hungarian Kingdom | Habsburg monarchy; Holy Roman Empire; Royal Hungary; Duchy of Carniola |

Commanders and leaders
| John Zápolya | Johann Katzianer; Bálint Török |

Units involved
| Serb, Transylvanian, and Polish mercenaries | |

Strength
| 15,000 | 13,000–14,000 |

The Battle of Szina or Seňa took place near Szina in the Kingdom of Hungary (present-day Seňa, in Slovakia). The battle was fought on 20 March 1528 between two rival kings of Hungary John Zápolya and Ferdinand I. The latter's forces under command of Bálint Török and Johann Katzianer, a Styrian mercenary commander defeated John's army; the battle was the second military defeat for John Zápolya during the civil war.

== Preparations ==
After the Battle of Mohács, where King Louis II of Hungary was killed, John Zápolya, Voivode of Transylvania, ascended to the Hungarian throne. However, Archduke Ferdinand of Austria also claimed the throne through the House of Habsburg intermarriages with Louis II's Jagiellon dynasty. In 1527, Ferdinand invaded Hungary and defeated John in the Battle of Tarcal (near Tokaj).

Zápolya recruited a new army, and in 1528 advanced into Hungary with approximately 15,000 men, including Transylvanian, Polish, and Serbian troops, but few Hungarians. Carniolan Johann Katzianer and Bálint Török marched against Zápolya with an army recruited from Hungary, Austria, and the German states of the Holy Roman Empire, numbering approximately 13,000–14,000 men. They met Zápolya's army near Kassa (modern Košice, Slovakia).

== Battle ==
The presence of Török and Katzianer near Kassa prevented Zápolya's army from marching on the capital city Buda. In the meantime, discord broke out in Zápolya's army between the Serbian and Polish mercenaries. Zápolya's cavalry and infantry was less skilled than the German infantry (the landsknechts), but the Polish mercenaries fought gallantly against the Austrians. In Zápolya's army, 300 Polish soldiers and a few thousand other men were killed.

After Zápolya's defeat, he was pursued by Bálint Török and Lajos Pekry; he fled into Poland seeking help. When Polish King Sigismund I the Old declined to proclaim war against Austria, Zápolya turned to Suleiman I, Sultan of Ottomans for help. Suleiman then sent Petru Rareş, the Voivode of Moldavia, into Transylvania. Petru Rareş defeated Ferdinand in the Battle of Feldioara and the Ottoman army (including Moldavians and Serbs) lay Siege of Vienna.

== Sources ==
- Sándor Szilágyi: History of the Hungarian Nation (A Magyar Nemzet Története)
- Military History of Hungary, Editor: Ervin Liptai Zrínyi Military Publisher, Budapest 1985. ISBN 978-963-326-337-2
