= Hungarian campaign of 1527–1528 =

Part of the Ottoman–Habsburg wars

Campaign of Ferdinand I
- Part of the Habsburg–Ottoman wars in Hungary (1526–1568)
Date	1527–1528
Location	Kingdom of Hungary
Result	Habsburg victory

Belligerents
Habsburg Austria; Holy Roman Empire; Kingdom of Bohemia; Kingdom of Croatia; Ferdinand's Hungarian kingdom Rascians; Duchy of Carniola	(Ottoman Empire) Ottoman Empire; John Zápolya's Hungarian kingdom

Commanders and leaders
Ferdinand I Casimir of Brandenburg # Nicholas, Count of Salm; Ivan Karlović; Jovan Nenad †; Bálint Török; Johann Katzianer	John Zápolya; Christoph Frankopan †; Péter Perényi (until 1527); Ferenc Bodó (POW); Lukács Kismarjai †; Pavle Bakić (until 1527)

The Hungarian Civil War (Hungarian: magyar belháború) or campaign of 1527–1528 was launched by Ferdinand I, Archduke of Austria and King of Hungary and Bohemia and his Hungarian followers against the Ottoman Turks. Following the Battle of Mohács, the Ottomans were forced to withdraw as events elsewhere in their now massive Empire required the Sultan's attention. Seizing upon their absence, Ferdinand I attempted to enforce his claim as King of Hungary. In 1527 he drove back the Ottoman vassal John Zápolya and captured Buda, Győr, Komárom, Esztergom, and Székesfehérvár by 1528. Meanwhile, the Ottoman Sultan, Suleiman the Magnificent, took no action at this stage despite the pleas of his vassal.

The civil war was preceded by the death of Louis II of Hungary and the subsequent siege of Buda by the Turks. During this era Hungary broke into 3.: Royal Hungary, Kingdom of Eastern Hungary (or Kingdom of Zápolya) and Ottoman Hungary (and some self-governing regions). In the Kingdom of Croatia in personal union with Hungary there was also a division and military conflict between the supporters of Ferdinand I and John Zápolya. Zápolya's followers invoked the decision of the Diet of the Estates, while Ferdinand's followers invoked the blood relationship between the Árpád dynasty and the House of Habsburg (from the First Congress of Vienna).

== Aftermath ==
On 10 May 1529, Suleiman the Magnificent launched his own counter-attack negating all of Ferdinand's gains. Many of the recently captured forts surrendered without resistance, greatly speeding up the advance. As a result, Suleiman was able to reach and besiege Vienna.
