= Katzianer's Campaign =

Habsburg military campaign

- Part of the Hundred Years' Croatian–Ottoman War
- A map of 1537 Katzianer's Campaign.
Date	August–October 1537
Location	Slavonia
Result	Ottoman victory

Belligerents
Habsburg Monarchy: Holy Roman Empire; Archduchy of Austria; Kingdom of Bohemia; Duchy of Carniola; Kingdom of Hungary; Kingdom of Croatia; Duchy of Styria; County of Tyrol	Ottoman Empire

Commanders and leaders
(Holy Roman Empire) Johann Katzianer (executed) (Holy Roman Empire) Albrecht Schlick (Holy Roman Empire) Ludwig Lodron †; Petar Keglević; Pavle Bakić †	Mehmed-beg Jahjapašić

Strength
24,000; 16,000 infantry 8,000 cavalry 7–8 large cannons 40 field cannons	8,000

Casualties and losses
20,000 killed at the Battle of Gorjani. Several hundred losses during the siege.	Negligible

Katzianer's Campaign or Katzianer's War (Croatian: Katzianerova vojna) was a failed 1537 Habsburg attempt of driving the Ottomans away from the region of Slavonia in modern-day Croatia. Despite being well-resourced, Katzianer's army failed to achieve any objectives, and it was ultimately completely annihilated in the Battle of Gorjani.

== Background ==
After Hungarian defeat in the Battle of Mohacs, Croatian nobility elected Ferdinand I Habsburg as their new king in the Diet of Cetingrad, while Hungarian and Slavonian nobility elected John Zapolya, which plummeted the kingdom into a civil war between two rival kings. By 1528 Ferdinand managed to gain the upper hand over Zapolya in Hungary, however, Zapolya in turn swore an oath to the Ottoman sultan and became his vassal. By spring of 1537, Ferdinand decided to take more decisive effort against the Ottomans so he sent his seasoned commander Johann Katzianer to Križevci to assemble an army and make preparations for the conquest of Osijek, which was supposed to cut the way for the Ottoman forces between Belgrade and Hungary and prevent their further advance to western Slavonia.

== The Campaign ==
In August 1537 Katzianer's army was encamped near Koprivnica and in September they started marching eastwards towards Virovitica. Disagreements soon inflamed between Katzianer and Schlick over the command of the troops as well as between Czech and Styrian soldiers in the army. By September 10 Katzianer's forces reached Virovitica where they ran out of food and became further eroded by maladies due to the autumn rains.

By mid-September, the army reached Valpovo where they started making preparations for a strike on Osijek. However, the Ottomans sent a 5,000 strong reinforcement to the town which mitigated Katzianer's chances for a regular siege. After achieving nothing near Osijek, the army attempted to withdraw back to Valpovo, but the Ottomans had cut off their way so instead they decided to maneuver southwest into swampy areas around the Vuka river, while also being constantly harassed by the Ottoman attacks. By October 7, the hungry and exhausted army reached Gorjani, hoping to march north towards Valpovo in search for food, however the remaining troops found out that Katzianer and some other leading commanders had already deserted them. The remnants of this army were crushed by the Ottomans in the ensuing Battle of Gorjani.

== Aftermath ==
Disaster of this campaign enraged Emperor Ferdinand so Katzianer was tried for cowardice and thrown in prison. He subsequently escaped prison and killed a peasant along the way, only to be captured and executed in 1539 on orders of Nikola IV Zrinski.

== Sources ==
- Kacijaner, Ivan, Croatian Encyclopedia
- Klaić, Vjekoslav, History of the Croats (Povijest Hrvata), Matica hrvatska, 1988.
- Tracy, James D. (2016). Balkan Wars: Habsburg Croatia, Ottoman Bosnia, and Venetian Dalmatia, 1499–1617. Rowman & Littlefield Publishers. ISBN 978-1-4422-1360-9.
