= Battle of Leobersdorf =

Battle during the Little War in Hungary

- Part of the Little War in Hungary within Ottoman–Habsburg wars and the Habsburg–Ottoman war of 1529–1533
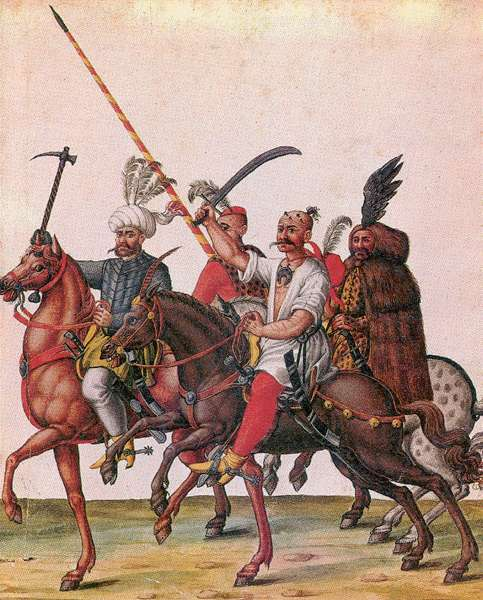
- Balkan Slavic Akindžije in Central Hungary, 16th century
Date	19 September 1532
Location	Leobersdorf, Lower Austria, Archduchy of Austria (today's Austria)
Result	Habsburg victory

Belligerents
Habsburg Monarchy: Kingdom of Hungary; Duchy of Carniola	Ottoman Empire

Commanders and leaders
Sebastian Schertlin von Burtenbach; Frederick II, Elector Palatine; Johann Katzianer; Bálint Török	Kazim Bey

Strength
20,000 Landsknechts, 2,000 heavy and light Hungarian cavalry, unknown artillery	8,000 – 16,000 Ottoman Akinjis

Casualties and losses
Unknown	Most of the army

The Battle of Leobersdorf was fought near Leobersdorf on 19 September 1532, as part of the Habsburg–Ottoman War of 1526–1568.

== The battle ==
After the failed Siege of Vienna in 1529, Sultan Suleiman gathered another massive army of 120,000 troops to besiege Vienna a second time in 1532. The small garrison of Koszeg consisting of 700 men led by Croatian Captain Nikola Jurišić blocked the way to Vienna for the main Ottoman Army.

In the meantime, 8,000-16,000 Ottoman light cavalry, under Kazim Bey, raided Styria and bypassed Wiener Neustadt, and southern parts of Lower Austria.

When Kazim Bey was informed of the retreat of the Ottoman main army under the command of Suleyman the Magnificent, he gathered his raiders in Pottenstein to link up with the main army. Of the three possible valleys he could follow, two were blocked by abatis. An Austrian detachment under Sebastian Schertlin von Burtenbach managed to drive the Ottomans into the only remaining open valley, where a large army of 20,000 Landsknechts, 1,000 heavy cavalry, 1,000 light cavalry from Hungary, and artillery led by Palatinian Count Frederick, Count Bálint Török, and Johann Katzianer were waiting for them.

Kazim Bey's Ottoman army was completely destroyed.

== See also ==
- Leopold Kupelwieser, Die Kämpfe Oesterreichs mit den Osmanen vom Jahre 1526 bis 1537, Wilhelm Braumuller, 1899.
