= Battle of Palást =

Battle of Palást (1552)
- Part of Habsburg–Ottoman war of 1551–1562
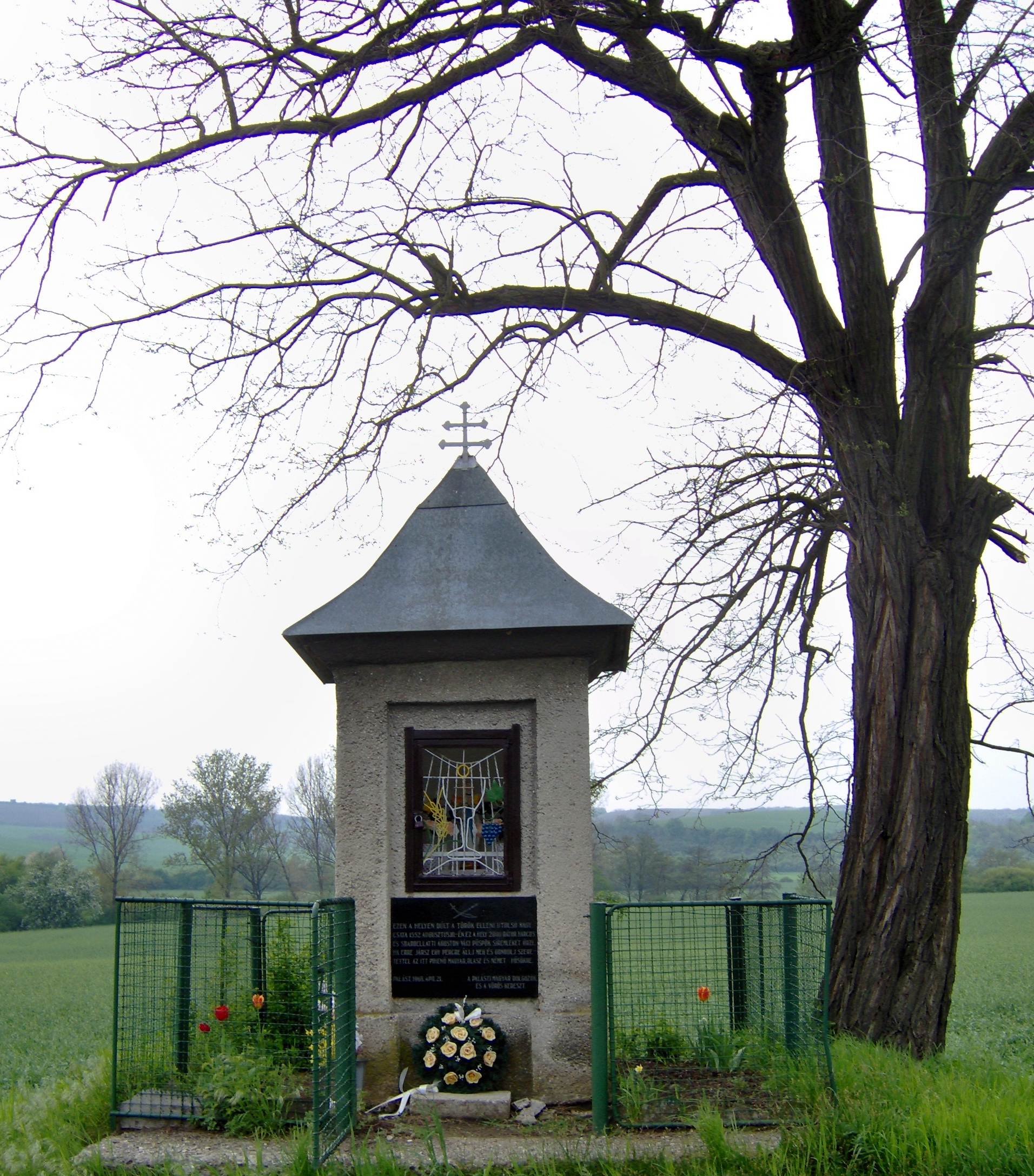
- Chapel commemorating the Battle of Palást in 1552.
Date	9–10 August 1552
Location	Plášťovce, Slovakia
Result	Ottoman victory

Belligerents
Holy Roman Empire; Kingdom of Hungary; Kingdom of Bohemia; Papal States	Ottoman Empire

Commanders and leaders
(Holy Roman Empire) Erasmus von Teufel (executed) (Holy Roman Empire) Sforza-Pallavicini (POW) (Holy Roman Empire) Marcel Detritz	Ali Hadim Pasha; Arslan Bey

Strength
10,850 men	12,000 men

Casualties and losses
Thousands killed 4,000 captured	Unknown

The battle of Palást was a military engagement between the Ottomans and the Habsburg army in Plášťovce. The Habsburg army attempted to stop the Ottoman advance but was defeated by the Pasha of Buda.

== Background ==
A new war broke out in 1552. The Ottoman sultan, Suleiman, launched a campaign in Hungary. The Ottomans captured Temesvár and Veszprém. At that time, the Pasha of Buda, Ali Hadim, decided to invade Central Slovakia, which formed the economic support for the Habsburgs. The majority of the cities surrendered without bloodshed. Ferdinand I begged his brother Charles for help, but to no avail. Left alone, Ferdinand recruited 4,500 Italian mercenaries led by Sforza-Pallavicini and 3,000 German landsknechts led by Marcel Detritz, aided by 650 cavalry from different parts of Hungary and an additional 800 Bohemian-Moravian infantry and 800 Hajduk.

The entire army numbered 10,850 men. The Emperor appointed Erasmus von Teufel as the commander of the army. Ferdinand also gathered an insurgent force of 7,000 men stationed in the Fülek area. Ali Pasha heard of the Habsburg preparations and acted quickly to prevent both armies from meeting together. Ali Pasha left with an army of 12,000 men.

== Battle ==
Teufel decided to set out to retake Drégely, which was taken by the Ottomans earlier, instead of waiting for the insurgent forces. The Habsburg army arrived in Palást. On August 9, 1552, the Habsburg army met the Ottoman force led by Arslan Bey. The Ottomans, using 3 cannons, began harassing the Habsburgs. The Hungarian and German forces broke out of the camp and engaged in an indecisive battle where both sides sustained casualties. The Italians engaged but were surrounded by the Ottomans. The Hungarians managed to save the Italian force from the encirclement, thus ending the first day of battle.

The next day, Teufel made the formation for battle, with the Germans and Italians in the center, the Hungarians in the right, and the German cuirassiers to the left. The battle started with the Habsburgs attacking the Ottomans; during the fight, the gunpowder storage exploded, throwing the Habsburgs in confusion and forcing them to retreat disorderly. The Ottomans used this advantage and attacked them, killing and capturing many of them. Among the captured were Teufel and Sforza-Pallavicini. Thousands were killed and around 4,000 prisoners were captured.

== Aftermath ==
The prisoners were taken to Buda. The towns in Slovakia were shocked with panic upon hearing the news of the defeat. Ali Pasha, however, returned to Buda without attacking Slovakia. Sforzia ransomed himself with 8,000 pieces of gold. Teufel was sent to Istanbul before the Sultan and executed. The German prisoners were sold into slavery.

== Sources ==
- József Bánlaky: Military history of the Hungarian nation (MEK-OSZK), 0014/1149. The Battle of Palast.
- Mihály Matunák (1910): The Battle of Palást. Military History Bulletins (Hadtörténelmi Közlemények) 11.
- Jan Rychlík (2024), Dějiny Slovenska.
