= Truce of Constantinople (1533) =

1533 treaty between the Ottoman Empire and the archducy of Austria

The Truce of Constantinople (Turkish: İstanbul antlaşması) was signed on 22 July 1533 in Constantinople by the Ottoman Empire and the Archduchy of Austria after the Habsburg–Ottoman war of 1529–1533.

According to several sources, this and other ceasefire agreements produced in 1547, 1568, 1573, 1576, 1584 and 1591 were truces or armistices (with a limited period of mutual non-aggression) and not treaties, as no real peace treaty was concluded in the entire sixteenth century. Gábor Ágoston calls this a treaty or truce, but defines its nature as mere "verbal promise" (correspondences between Ferdinand and his envoy also show the agreement as a matter between Suleyman and the king). Mortimer also states the truce was between Ferdinand and Suleyman. Only the 1547 truce received endorsement from Charles V.

== Background ==
During the Battle of Mohács in 1526 the king of Hungary, Louis II, had died without an heir to throne, but since the Ottoman Empire did not annex Hungary after the war, the Hungarian throne was left vacant for several months. Two claimants emerged: Ferdinand I, the archduke of Austria; and János Szapolyai, the voivode (governor) of Transylvania (Turkish: Erdel, now the west of Romania). Although Szapolyai was backed by most of the Hungarian elite, Ferdinand declared himself the legal king of Hungary, with the support of his older brother, Charles V, Holy Roman Emperor. The Ottoman Empire, however, backed Szapolyai, and Emperor Suleyman I mounted a threat against Austria in two military campaigns (of 1529 and 1532). Ferdinand saw that it was impossible to establish his rule in Hungary.

Meanwhile, the shah of Safavid Persia, Tahmasp I, became active in the eastern borders of the Ottoman Empire. Suleyman decided to concentrate his activities in the east and to give up his pursuit of hostilities in the west and so the treaty was signed.

== Terms ==
In this treaty Ferdinand I acknowledged Ottoman suzerainty and recognised Suleiman as his “father and suzerain”, he agreed to pay an annual tribute for his possessions in Hungary and accepted the Ottoman grand vizier as his brother and equal in rank.

According to Nicolae Jorga (translated by Nilüfer Epçeli), Ferdinand withdrew his assertions on Hungary save a small territory in its west of Hungary.

According to Gábor Ágoston, Suleyman had given Kingdom of Hungary to King John, but was willing to accept a partition with the Habsburgs. To delimit the borders, he sent Ludovico Gritti to Hungary.

Stanford Shaw says that Ferdinand was referred to as the King of Germany and Charles V as the King of Spain. Moreover, Sueliaman told Ferdinand to stop calling anyone 'emperor' except the Ottoman sultan. According to others, while the Ottoman chancery addressed Charles and Ferdinand (also in their letters) as Kings, the Habsburgs never recognized this. Also, in other correspondences, the Ottomans elevated Francis and Charles IX to emperors showing an inconsistency in their use of titles.

== Aftermath ==
From 1536, after successfully completing his "campaign of the two Iraqs" (1534 to 1535), Suleyman considered the truce invalid.

Peace was broken with the 1537 Battle of Gorjani and the 1538 Battle of Preveza.

Szapolyai had no son, and according to the Treaty of Nagyvárad, signed in 1538, Ferdinand was the heir to the throne. However, after the treaty, Szapolyai's wife gave birth to a son. In 1540, when Szapolyai died of natural causes, Ferdinand reclaimed the throne, and the war was renewed. This time, Suleyman reversed his policy of allowing Hungary to persist as a vassal kingdom and annexed most of Hungary in his two campaigns in 1541 and 1543. Szapolyai's infant son was transferred to Transylvania, his father's former principality.
