= Toygun Pasha =

Ottoman governor of Budin from 1553 to 1556 and 1558 to 1559

Toygun Pasha (died 1559) was Beylerbey (governor) of Budin Eyalet of the Ottoman Empire from February 1553 to 23 February 1556 and 5 November 1558 to June 1559.

Toygun Pasha built a mosque, madrasa (school), and bathhouse in Budapest that came to be known after his name. Toygun Pasha Mosque is known to have remained intact at the time of the city's takeover by Austria in 1686. The property was transferred to Capuchin priests, who converted it to a church. The structure was partially demolished in 1770 to make way for the construction of a new church. Parts of it were rediscovered through archaeological excavations in 1972.

== Bibliography ==
- Dávid, Géza (1992). "Budin". TDV Encyclopedia of Islam, Vol. 6 (Beşi̇r Ağa Cami̇i̇ – Câfer Paşa Tekkesi̇) (in Turkish). Istanbul: Turkiye Diyanet Foundation, Centre for Islamic Studies. pp. 344–348. ISBN 978-975-389-433-3.
- Eyice, Semavi (1992). "Budin". TDV Encyclopedia of Islam, Vol. 6 (Beşi̇r Ağa Cami̇i̇ – Câfer Paşa Tekkesi̇) (in Turkish). Istanbul: Turkiye Diyanet Foundation, Centre for Islamic Studies. pp. 348–352. ISBN 978-975-389-433-3.
- Kılıç, Orhan (Fall 2019). "Budin ve Tımışvar Eyaletlerinin Paşaları: Karşılaştırmalı Bir Analiz" [Pashas of Budin and Temesvar Eyalets: A Comparative Analysis]. Journal of the Center for Ottoman Studies. 46. Ankara University: 191–229. ISSN 1019-469X.
