= Battle of Gorjani =

1537 battle

Battle of Gorjani (1537)
- Part of the Little War in Hungary and Hundred Years' Croatian–Ottoman War and Katzianer's Campaign
- Troop movements during Katzianer's Campaign.
Date	9 October 1537
Location	Gorjani, Kingdom of Croatia, Kingdom of Hungary (present-day Croatia)
Result	Ottoman victory

Belligerents
Habsburg Monarchy: Holy Roman Empire; Archduchy of Austria; Kingdom of Bohemia; Duchy of Carniola; Kingdom of Hungary; Kingdom of Croatia; Duchy of Styria; County of Tyrol	Ottoman Empire

Commanders and leaders
(Holy Roman Empire) Johann Katzianer (executed) (Holy Roman Empire) Ludwig Lodron † (Holy Roman Empire) Pavle Bakić †	Semendireli Mehmed Pasha (governor of Belgrade)

Strength
24,000	8,000

Casualties and losses
20,000 killed	Negligible

The Battle of Gorjani (Croatian: Bitka kod Gorjana, German: Schlacht bei Gorjani) or Battle of Đakovo (Hungarian: Diakovári csata) was fought on 9 October 1537 at Gorjani, a place in Slavonia (today in eastern Croatia), between the towns of Đakovo and Valpovo, as part of the Little War in Hungary as well as the Hundred Years' Croatian–Ottoman War.

== Background ==
After seven years of war and the failed Siege of Vienna in 1529, the Treaty of Konstantiniyye was signed, in which John Zápolya was recognized by the Austrians as King of Hungary as an Ottoman vassal, and the Ottomans recognized Habsburg rule over Royal Hungary.

This treaty satisfied neither John Zápolya nor Austrian Archduke Ferdinand, whose armies began to skirmish along the borders. Ferdinand decided to strike a decisive blow in 1537 at John, thereby violating the treaty.

== Battle ==
Ferdinand sent an army of 24,000 men (from Austria, Hungary, Holy Roman Empire, Bohemia, Tyrol and Croatia) under the command of the Carniolan nobleman Johann Katzianer to take Osijek.

The siege came to nothing and because of the appearance of the Ottoman cavalry sent by the governor of Belgrade, the army had to withdraw. The Ottoman army reached the Austrians near the swamps of Gorjani, near Đakovo and Valpovo on the Drava river. Katzianer noticed that the Ottoman army was smaller than he had expected, and ordered his fastest units to attack the Ottoman cavalry. The Ottoman cavalry fell back, but only to lure the Austrian cavalry into a trap. The Osijek garrison, as well as the Ottoman cavalry promptly attacked from both sides and the front, killing much of the Austrian cavalry. The Ottomans then launched a counterattack against Katzianer’s now defenseless infantry. The Austrians were severely defeated and Katzianer fled with the remaining cavalry and abandoned his army. The entire force was annihilated.

A reported 20,000 men were killed, including generals Ludwig Lodron and Pavle Bakić. Bakić's severed head was taken to Constantinople.

== Aftermath ==
This campaign was a disaster of similar magnitude to that of Mohács and therefore nicknamed the Austrian Mohacs. The news of the defeat came as a shock in Vienna and a new Treaty of Nagyvárad was signed in 1538.

Katzianer was arrested, and Nikola Jurišić took his place as the commander of Croatian defence. Some time later, Katzianer escaped the Vienna prison and hid at the Zrinski estates, until he lost Zrinski's favor, and was thus executed.

== Sources ==
- Jaques, Tony (2007). Dictionary of Battles and Sieges: A Guide to 8,500 Battles from Antiquity Through the Twenty-First Century. Greenwood Publishing Group. ISBN 978-0313335396.
- Budak, Neven (2002). "Habsburzi i Hrvati - Građanski rat" [Habsburgs and the Croats - Civil war]. Kolo (3).
- Turnbull, Stephen (2003). The Ottoman Empire 1326 - 1699. Osprey, New York. p. 52.
- Ivić, Aleksa (1914). Историја Срба у Угарској: од пада Смедерева до сеобе под Чарнојевићем (1459-1690). Zagreb: Привредникова.
