= Plášťovce =

Plášťovce Palást
- Municipality
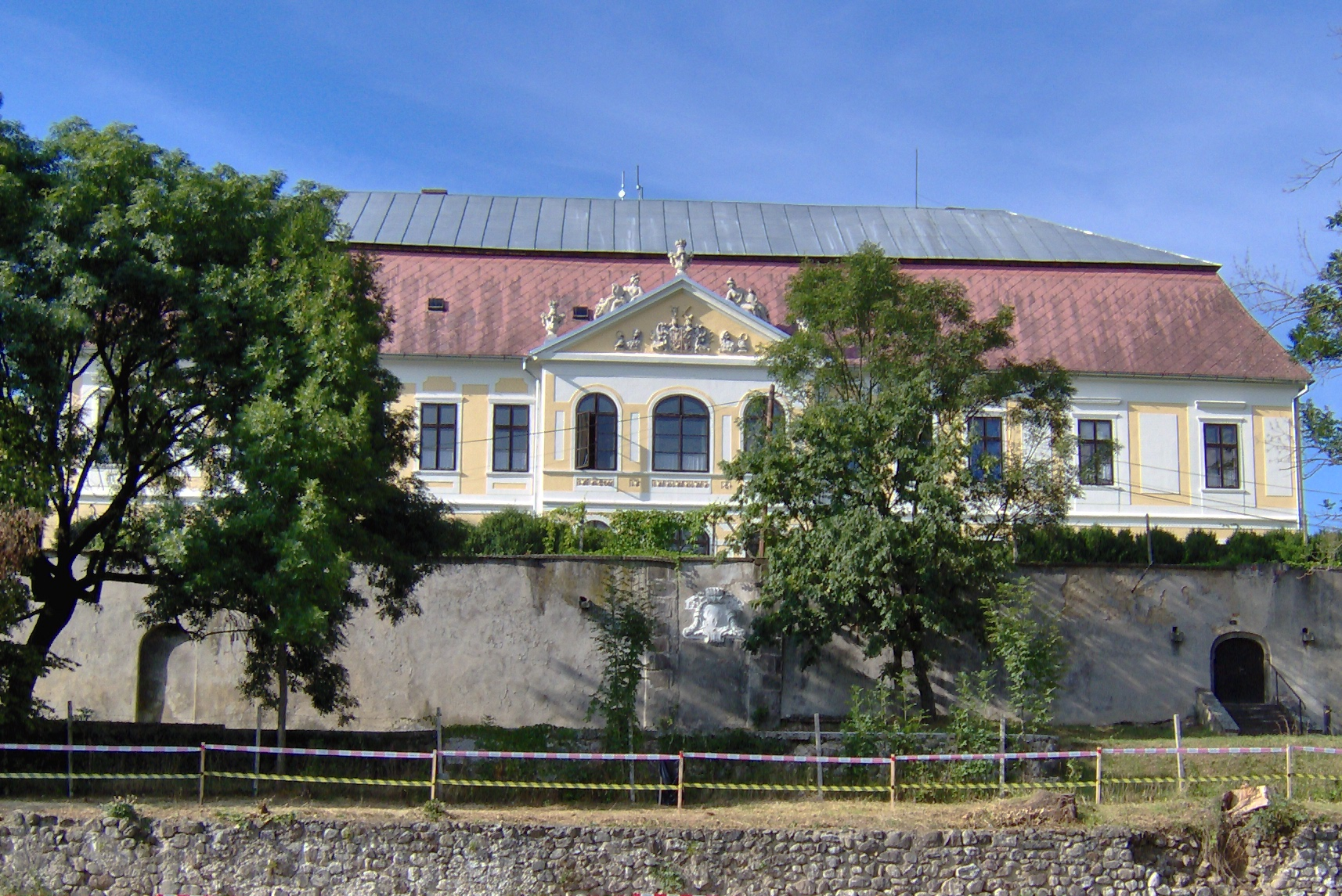
- Palásthy manor house in Plášťovce.

- Flag

- Location of Plášťovce in the Nitra Region Location of Plášťovce in Slovakia
- Coordinates: 48.16°N 18.98°E
- Country: Slovakia
- Region: Nitra Region
- District: Levice District
- First mentioned: 1156

Government
  - Mayor: Péter Köpöncei (Hungarian Alliance)

Area
  - Total: 50.50 km^{2} (19.50 sq mi)
- Elevation: 147 m (482 ft)

Population (2025)
  - Total: 1,423
- Time zone: UTC+1 (CET)
  - Summer (DST): UTC+2 (CEST)
- Postal code: 935 82
- Area code: +421 36
- Vehicle registration plate (until 2022): LV
- Website: www.plastovce.sk

Plášťovce (Hungarian: Palást) is a village and municipality in the Levice District in the Nitra Region of Slovakia.

== History ==
In historical records the village was first mentioned in 1156. In 1552 a locally significant battle between the Ottomans and Hungarian forces has happened here. The Hungarian army consisted of Italian and German mercenaries /8500 strength/, Czech infantry, Hungarians Hajdus, the city defence forces from the mining towns and local military units. They were defeated, 4000 taken prisoner and the captain taking to Istanbul where he was executed.

== Geography ==
The municipality lies at an altitude of 147 metres (482 ft) and covers an area of 50.50 km^{2} (19.50 sq mi) (2025).

== Population ==
Population statistic (10 years)
Year	1995	2005	2015	2025
Count	1788	1690	1574	1423
Difference		−5.48%	−6.86%	−9.59%

Population statistic
Year	2024	2025
Count	1442	1423
Difference		−1.31%

It has a population of 1423 people (31 December 2025).

=== Ethnicity ===
Census 2021 (1+ %)
Ethnicity	Number	Fraction
Hungarian	941	62.56%
Slovak	603	40.09%
Not found out	33	2.19%
Total	1504	

In year 2021 was 1504 people by ethnicity 941 as Hungarian, 603 as Slovak, 33 as Not found out, 12 as Romani, 5 as Czech, 3 as Vietnamese, 2 as German, 2 as English, 1 as Ukrainian and 1 as Other.

Note on population: The difference values of population numbers in the table "Population statistic" and in the sections "Ethnicity" & "Religion" is caused by the use of various statistical methods.

=== Religion ===
Census 2021 (1+ %)
Religion	Number	Fraction
Roman Catholic Church	1376	91.49%
None	74	4.92%
Not found out	17	1.13%
Total	1504	

In year 2021 was 1504 people by religion 1376 from Roman Catholic Church, 74 from None, 17 from Not found out, 10 from Evangelical Church, 9 from Christian Congregations in Slovakia, 7 from Greek Catholic Church, 5 from Calvinist Church, 2 from Other and not ascertained christian church, 2 from Czechoslovak Hussite Church, 1 from Eastern Orthodox Church and 1 from Ad hoc movements.

== Facilities ==
The village has a public library a gym and football pitch.

== Places of interest ==
- Roman Catholic church, 1898.
- Manor, 18th century, baroque style. It was rebuilt to neoclassicistic style in the beginning of the 19th century. It is a Roman Catholic school.
- Volksmuseum

== Twin towns — sister cities ==
- - Kose Parish, Estonia
- - Ócsa, Hungary
