= James Tracy (historian) =

American historian (born 1938)

James D. Tracy
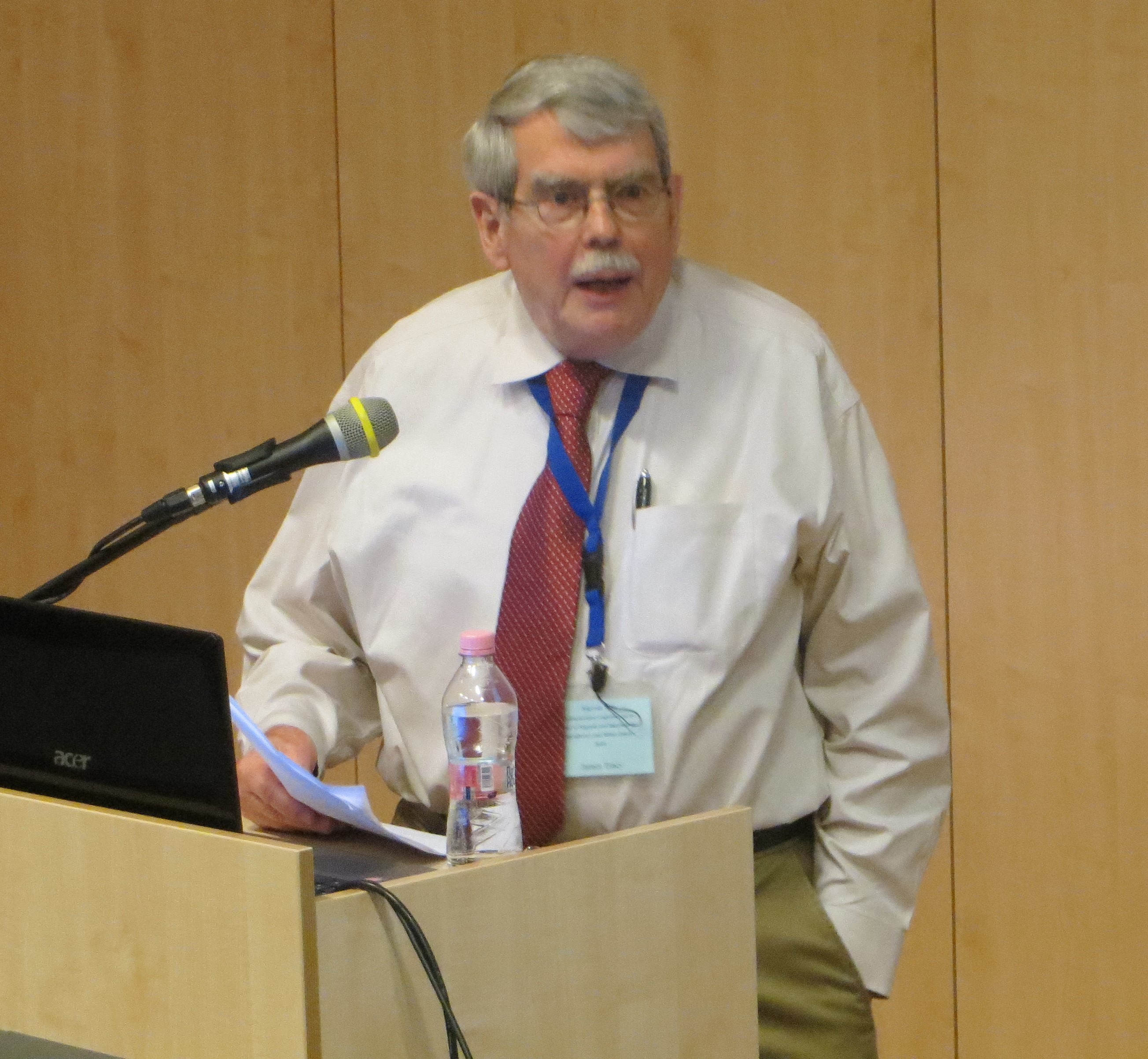
- James D. Tracy at the Commemorative Conference on the Siege of Szigetvár and Süleyman the Magnificent's and Miklós Zrinyi's Deaths in Hungary, September 2016
- Born: James Donald Tracy; 1938 (age 87–88); St. Louis, Missouri, U.S.
- Spouse: Suzanne K. Swan (m. 1997)

Academic background
- Education: Saint Louis University (BA); University of Notre Dame (MA); Johns Hopkins University (MA); Princeton University (PhD)

Academic work
- Discipline: History
- Sub-discipline: Early Modern Europe; Reformation; Renaissance
- Institutions: University of Minnesota
- Main interests: Early Modern Europe
- Notable works: A Financial Revolution in the Habsburg Netherlands (1985); Emperor Charles V, Impresario of War: Campaign Strategy, International Finance, and Domestic Politics (2002)

James Donald Tracy (born 1938) is an American historian. With Heiko A. Oberman, he was co-founder of the Journal of Early Modern History, and editor from 1999 through 2010. He has served as president of the Sixteenth Century Society and Conference, the Society for Reformation Research, and the American Catholic Historical Association. At the University of Minnesota, he was associate dean of the College of Liberal Arts, chaired the Department of History, and held the Union Pacific Chair in Early Modern History from 2001 to 2004. Upon his retirement, Tracy was granted emeritus status. Among early modernists he is known for his contributions to an unusual range of research areas.

== Early life and education ==
Tracy was born in 1938 in St. Louis, Missouri. He received his BA from Saint Louis University, and a MA from the University of Notre Dame and another from Johns Hopkins University, before receiving his PhD. from Princeton University in Renaissance and Reformation History. He married Suzanne K. Swan, M.D. in 1997, and has three children from his first marriage.

== Research areas ==
=== Renaissance and Reformation ===
Erasmus of Rotterdam ranks among the greatest of scholars. But as Erasmus: The Growth of a Mind (1972) and other studies show, he was more caught up in the bitter conflicts of the age than has been thought. Events made him change his mind in some ways. Like politically active friends in the Low Countries, he harbored dark suspicions about the government of his native provinces (The Politics of Erasmus, 1979). Even while distancing himself from Luther's Reformation, Erasmus quarreled more with fellow Catholics than with Protestants (Erasmus of the Low Countries,1996). Tracy also co-edited two volumes of state-of-the-question essays on Early Modern Europe, and published a textbook, Europe's Reformations (1999), described as "a well-informed, critical, independent-minded, but essentially traditional view of the subject."

=== War and finance ===
Early modern wars were fought on borrowed money, but princes had terrible credit ratings. One solution was for provinces to fund and manage, in the sovereign's name, a long-term, low-interest debt in which investors could have confidence. A Financial Revolution in the Habsburg Netherlands (1985) was said to have identified "a major development in European history that has somehow escaped all previous scholarly treatment." What Tracy calls "fiscal intermediation" took many forms. Emperor Charles V, Impresario of War (2002), which examines how Emperor Charles V exploited in different ways the credit-worthiness of his various realms, has been called "one of the few serious contributions in any language during the last century to the study of Charles V in his European context.

=== The Low Countries ===
Prior to the 1980s, historians of the Dutch Revolt tended to pass over the preceding Habsburg era relatively quickly. Holland under Habsburg Rule (1990) described how fiscal pressure from Habsburg authorities forced the provinces to develop many of the institutional mechanisms that would, in a few decades, prove necessary for local self-government. This was "in many respects a new and attractive view of Holland's provincial government." Historians also like to credit the young republic's success in withstanding Spain to a patriotic cohesion among the rebel provinces, notwithstanding the selfish "particularism" of wealthy Holland. The Founding of the Dutch Republic (2008) argued that what held Spanish armies at bay in the difficult early years was that the States of Holland directed resources first and foremost to a successful defense of their own provincial border.

=== Early modern history ===
As director of Minnesota's Center for Early Modern History (CEMH), Tracy organized in 1987 a major research conference on "Merchant Empires". He then edited one volume of substantial essays on long-distance trade in the early modern world and another on the characteristically European entanglement of state power and mercantile interest. These volumes were well received: "To speak of these essays as attaining a high level would be faint praise; their quality is excellent." Subsequent CEMH conference volumes dealt with the global phenomenon of walled cities, and the relations between religion and the early modern state as seen from China, Russia, and Great Britain.

=== The Habsburg Monarchy and the Ottoman Empire ===
In the long confrontation between the Habsburgs and Ottomans, the sultan's forces held the upper hand until nearly 1600. Historians pay little attention to conflicts during the sixteenth century, and virtually ignore the southern or Croatian sector of the frontier. Balkan Wars (2016) traces the connected histories of three adjoining provinces that shared the same language and culture but were divided among rival empires: Habsburg Croatia, Ottoman Bosnia, and Venetian Dalmatia. Tracy does not read Turkish or Hungarian; he uses published sources in other languages and unpublished diplomatic correspondence to "break ground in a field as yet little cultivated." Several essays deal with the Hungarian sector of the frontier and propose a modified version of Samuel Huntington's "clash of civilizations" thesis.

== Awards ==
Tracy received a Guggenheim Fellowship in 1972/1973, a Fulbright Research Grant to Belgium in 1979/1980, and a National Endowment for the Humanities Conference Grant in 1985. He was a Fellow of the Netherlands Institute of Advanced Studies in 1993/1994. He has been Gastdocent at the Rijksuniversiteit te Leiden (Spring 1987), Professeur associé at the Université de Paris-IV (the Sorbonne) (Spring 2001), and Gastdocent at the Universiteit van Amsterdam (Fall 2004).

== Selected publications ==
=== Renaissance and Reformation ===
Erasmus: The Growth of a Mind (Geneva: Droz, 1972, 258 pp.). ISBN 9782600030410.

The Politics of Erasmus: A Pacifist Intellectual and his Political Milieu (Toronto: University of Toronto Press, 1979, 216 pp.). ISBN 9780802053930.

Erasmus of the Low Countries (Berkeley: University of California Press, 1996, 297 pp.). ISBN 9780520087453.

Europe's Reformations, 1450–1650 (Lanham, Md., Rowman & Littlefield, 1999, paper and hardback, 387 pages; 2nd edition, 2006). ISBN 9780742537897.

Co-edited with Thomas A. Brady and Heiko A. Oberman, Handbook of European History, 1400–1600, vol. I (709 pp.), and vol. II (722 pp.) (Leiden: Brill, 1994, 1995, paperback edition Grand Rapids: Eerdmans, 1996). ISBN 9789004391659.

Co-edited with Manfred Hoffman, Collected Works of Erasmus, vol. 78, Controversies (Toronto: University of Toronto Press, 2011, 498 pp.). ISBN 9780802098665.

=== War and finance ===
A Financial Revolution in the Habsburg Netherlands: Renten and Renteniers in the County of Holland, 1515–1565 (Berkeley: University of California Press, 1985, 276 pp.). ISBN 9780520336704.

Emperor Charles V, Impresario of War: Campaign Strategy, International Finance, and Domestic Politics (Cambridge: Cambridge University Press, 2002). ISBN 9780521814317.

=== The Low Countries ===
Holland under Habsburg Rule: The Formation of a Body Politic (Berkeley: University of California Press, 1990, 332 pp.). ISBN 9780520304031.

The Founding of the Dutch Republic: War, Finance, and Politics in Holland, 1572–1588 (346 pp., Oxford: Oxford University Press, 2008). ISBN 9780199209118.

The Low Countries in the Sixteenth Century: Erasmus, Religion, Politics, Trade and Finance (Ashgate/Variorum, 2005), Fourteen essays from 1968 to 2000). ISBN 9780860789550.

=== Early modern history ===
Edited volume, The Rise of Merchant Empires: Long-Distance Trade in World History in the Early Modern World, 1350–1750 (New York: Cambridge University Press, 1990, 442 pp., paperback edition 1993). ISBN 9780521457354.

Edited volume, The Political Economy of Merchant Empires State Power and World Trade, 1350–1750 (New York: Cambridge University Press, 1991, 504 pp., paperback edition 1993). ISBN 9780521574648.

Edited volume, City Walls: The Urban Enceinte in Global Perspective (Cambridge: Cambridge University Press, 2000, 687 pp.). ISBN 978-0521652216.

Co-edited with Marguerite Ragnow, Religion and the Early Modern State: Views from China, Russia, and the West (Cambridge: Cambridge University Press, 2004, 415 pp.). ISBN 9780511735059.

Edition, translation, and introduction, True Ocean Found: Paludanus' Letters on Dutch Voyages to the Kara Sea, 1595/1596 (Minneapolis: University of Minnesota Press, 1980, 77 pp.).

=== The Habsburg Monarchy and the Ottoman Empire ===
Balkan Wars: Habsburg Croatia, Ottoman Bosnia, and Venetian Dalmatia (Lanham, Md: Rowman & Littlefield, 2016, 456 pp.). ISBN 9780521574648.
