= Johann Katzianer =

Hungarian noble (1491–1539)

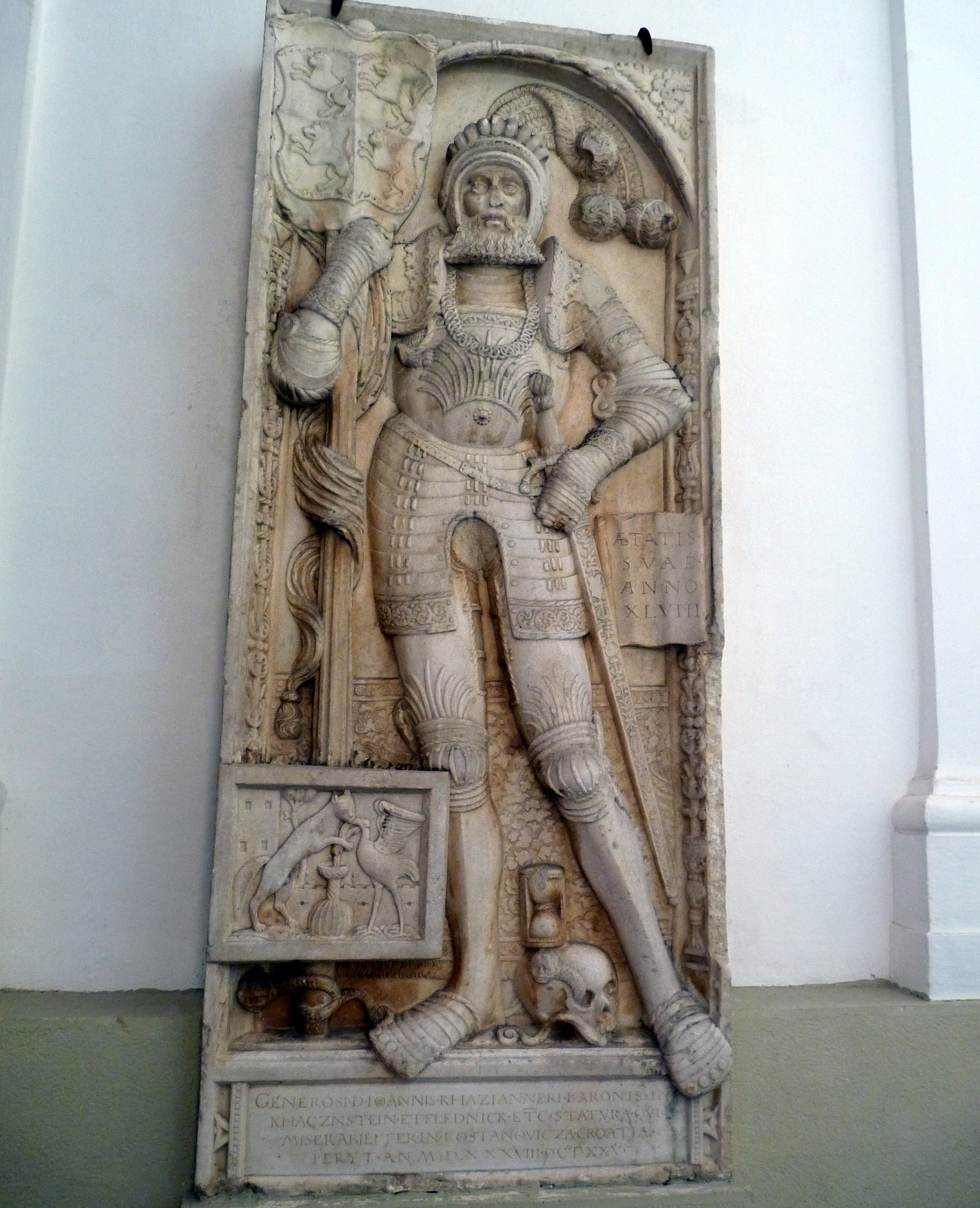
- The tombstone of Katzianer.
- Born: 1491; Begunje na Gorenjskem
- Died: 27 October 1539 (aged 47–48); Hrvatska Kostajnica
- Residence: Susedgrad
- Wars and battles: Battle of Tarcal; Battle of Szina; Siege of Vienna (1529); Katzianer's Campaign; Battle of Gorjani

Johann Katzianer (Croatian: Ivan Katzianer, Slovene: Ivan Kacijanar Hungarian: Katzianer János) or Hans Katzianer, Freiherr zu Katzenstein und Fledingen (1491, Begunje (German: Vigaun) – 27 October 1539, Hrvatska Kostajnica) was a Carniolan aristocrat and a commander of the Habsburg Imperial Army.

== History ==
He is first mentioned in 1527 when Archduke Ferdinand, brother to the emperor, gathered an army to support his claims on the throne of Hungary, which had become vacant after King Louis II of Hungary was killed in the Battle of Mohács (1526) against the Ottomans. Katzianer took part in Ferdinand's Hungarian campaign of 1527–1528 against the voivode of Transylvania, John Zápolya, who had also been proclaimed King, supported by a large faction of the nobility in the Hungarian kingdom.

Katzianer distinguished himself in the Battle of Tarcal in September 1527 and especially in the Battle of Szina in March 1528, but alienated himself from the population by the violence and misbehavior of his troops. In 1529 he participated in the Siege of Vienna against Suleiman the Magnificent. At the head of the light cavalry, he harassed the retreating Turks and liberated many Christian prisoners.

In 1530, he replaced bishop Krištof Ravbar as the governor (Landeshauptmann) of Duchy of Carniola. He served in that post until 1538 when he was replaced by Nikola Jurišić. After the death of Nicholas, Count of Salm in the same year, he was named commander in chief (Obristfeldhauptmann) of the troops in Hungary, where he held off under difficult circumstances new attacks from John Zápolya and Suleiman the Magnificent. He gained a great victory in the Battle of Leobersdorf (1532) where he destroyed a Turkish army led by Kasim Bey.

=== Death ===
In 1537 he was commander of an army of 24,000 men to besiege Osijek. The Katzianer's Campaign was a complete disaster and Katzianer was blamed for fleeing and abandoning his army to be annihilated in the Battle of Gorjani. He was arrested and sent to Vienna to be tried but escaped 31 January 1538 before the verdict could be rendered and fled to Fortress Kostajnica in Croatia. Here he contacted enemies of the Habsburgs to plot against Ferdinand, but the young Count Nikola IV Zrinski stabbed him during dinner.

== Sources ==
- Albrecht, Karl Friedrich Hermann (1882). "Katzianer, Hans" . Allgemeine Deutsche Biographie (in German). Vol. 15. Leipzig: Duncker & Humblot. pp. 458–459.
- Kohler, Alfred (1977). "Katzianer, Hans". Neue Deutsche Biographie (in German). Vol. 11. Berlin: Duncker & Humblot. pp. 338–339. (full text online).
