= Pavle Bakić =

Despot Pavle Bakić Pavle Bakić
- Serbian Despot
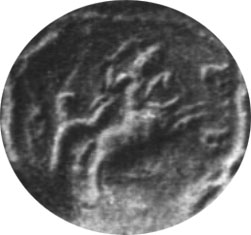
- Seal of Pavle Bakić (1533)

Despot of Serbia
- Reign: 1537
- Predecessor: Stefan Berislavić
- Successor: vacant
- Born: 1484; Šumadija, Ottoman Empire (today Serbia)
- Died: 9 October 1537 (age 52–53); Đakovo, Habsburg monarchy (today Croatia)
- Spouse: Teodora
- Issue: Margarita and Angelina
Names
- Pavle Bakić
- House: Bakić
- Father: Komnen Bakić
- Religion: Serbian Orthodox Christian

Pavle Bakić (Serbian Cyrillic: Павле Бакић, Hungarian: Bakics Pál; c. 1484 – 9 October 1537) was the last titular Despot of Serbia. He was one of the most notable military commanders among Serbian nobility in the Kingdom of Hungary, and fought against the Ottoman Empire in several battles, most notably at the Battle of Mohács (1526) and the Battle of Vienna (1529). He fell at the Battle of Gorjani (1537).

== Life ==
Pavle had a Turkish timar, as did his father, and was the lord of great estates around Venčac in Šumadija called "Bakić's land". He was viewed highly by the Ottoman Empire, and had the rights to collect taxes (harač) from his people.

In consultation with Pál Tomori and Louis II of Hungary, Pavle Bakić left his land with his family, five brothers, and a great number of Serbs, into Hungary, and in return he received the town of Lak among other estates. With his forces he participated in the Battle of Mohács in 1526.

After the battle the Šajkaši were still unpaid for their services. Ferdinand reprimanded the court for nothing having paid at least part of the unpaid salary to the Šajkaši. Bakić once again turned to Ferdinand, alerting him that the nonpayment to the Šajkaši would cause estrangement of the Serbs in his lands, and those of John Zápolya and the Ottoman Empire. He also informed Ferdinand of the persecution of Serbs by the Austrian staff and officers.

When the succession war between Ferdinand I and John Zápolya started, he took the side of Zápolya. After the defeat of Zápolya in the Battle of Tokaj in 1527, Bakić sided with Ferdinand, and would stay faithful to him for the rest of his life. In 1528, Ferdinand confirmed Bakić and his brothers' holdings and appointed him the captain of the Serbian infantry, cavalry and river forces.

During the Siege of Vienna in 1529, Serbian hussars under the command of Pavle Bakić were the first to engage the Turks when they attacked the capital. After the Ottoman conquest of Syrmia, Radoslav Čelnik sough refuge in Bakić's lands, in Győr. In charters of 1534, Ferdinand again confirmed Bakić and his brothers' holdings (Lak, Győr, Szombathely, Hédervár and all estates that were part of these towns). The fortress of Győr was administered by his Hungarian ally Count György Cseszneky.

By that time, previous holder of the title of Despot of Serbia, Stefan Berislavić was already dead (1535) and the title was vacant. A charter of king Ferdinand, dated September 20, 1537, designates Pavle Bakić as the new Despot, and calls all Serbs to join and follow Bakić as the Serbian Despot.

Attempts made by King Ferdinand to push the Ottomans out of the Banate of Slavonia and eastern counties (Požega County, Vukovo County), with the help of Pavle, were not successful. In 1537, Bakić did not manage to liberate Osijek from the Ottomans, he then retreated towards Đakovo, where he fell at the battle of Gorjani against the Ottomans. Mehmed-paša sent the head of Bakić to Constantinople.

== Family ==
He married Teodora, the daughter of a nobleman from the medieval Bosnia. They had two daughters:

- Margita, married Baron Menyhért Balassa
- Angelina, married Imre Révay, later Baron Imre Czobor de Czoborszentmihály.

== See also ==
- History of Ottoman Serbia

Regnal titles
Preceded by Stefan Berislavić	titular Despot of Serbia; 1537	Succeeded by vacant

== Sources ==
- Bataković, Dušan T., ed. (2005). Histoire du peuple serbe [History of the Serbian People] (in French). Lausanne: L’Age d’Homme. ISBN 9782825119587.
- Ćirković, Sima (2004). The Serbs. Malden: Blackwell Publishing. ISBN 9781405142915.
- Dávid, Géza; Fodor, Pál, eds. (1994). Hungarian-Ottoman Military and Diplomatic Relations in the Age of Süleyman the Magnificent. Budapest: Loránd Eötvös University, Hungarian Academy of Sciences, Institute of History. ISBN 9789638312310.
- Fodor, Pál; Dávid, Géza, eds. (2000). Ottomans, Hungarians, and Habsburgs in Central Europe: The Military Confines in the Era of Ottoman Conquest. Leiden: BRILL. ISBN 9004119078.
- Gavrilović, Slavko (1993). "Serbs in Hungary, Slavonia and Croatia in struggles against the Turks (15th-18th centuries)". Serbs in European Civilization. Belgrade: Nova, Serbian Academy of Sciences and Arts, Institute for Balkan Studies. pp. 41–54. ISBN 9788675830153.
- Jireček, Constantin (1918). Geschichte der Serben. Vol. 2. Gotha: Perthes.
- Krstić, Aleksandar R. (2017). "Which Realm will You Opt for? – The Serbian Nobility Between the Ottomans and the Hungarians in the 15th Century". State and Society in the Balkans Before and After Establishment of Ottoman Rule. Belgrade: Institute of History, Yunus Emre Enstitüsü Turkish Cultural Centre. pp. 129–163. ISBN 9788677431259.
- Lemajić, Nenad (2020). "The Bakićes as an example of the social rise of vlach families in the early Ottoman period". Istraživanja. 31. Filozofski fakultet u Novom Sadu: 93–111.
- Pálosfalvi, Tamás (2018). From Nicopolis to Mohács: A History of Ottoman-Hungarian Warfare, 1389-1526. Leiden: BRILL. ISBN 9789004375659.
