= Bálint Török =

Hungarian aristocrat

Bálint Török de Enying (25 September 1502 in Szigetvár – 1551 in Istanbul) was a Hungarian aristocrat, Ban of Nándorfehérvár (Belgrade), and between 1527–1542 the Lord of Csesznek. He led a rebellion against the Ottoman Empire until he was captured by the Ottomans and taken to Istanbul where he remained in captivity for the rest of his life.

== Sources ==
- Bessenyei József: A Héttorony foglya
- (MTA) Magyarország történeti kronológiája (II. kötet)
- Bethlen Farkas: Erdély története
- Nagy Iván: Magyarország családai czímerekkel és nemzedékrendi táblákkal
- Hóman Bálint-Szekfű Gyula: Magyar történet (III. kötet)
