= Eastern Hungarian Kingdom =

Region of Hungary controlled by the Zápolya family (1526-51, 1556-70), Ottoman vassal

Eastern Hungarian Kingdom keleti Magyar Királyság (Hungarian)
- 1526–1551; 1556–1570
- Royal standard of John I Coat of arms of John I

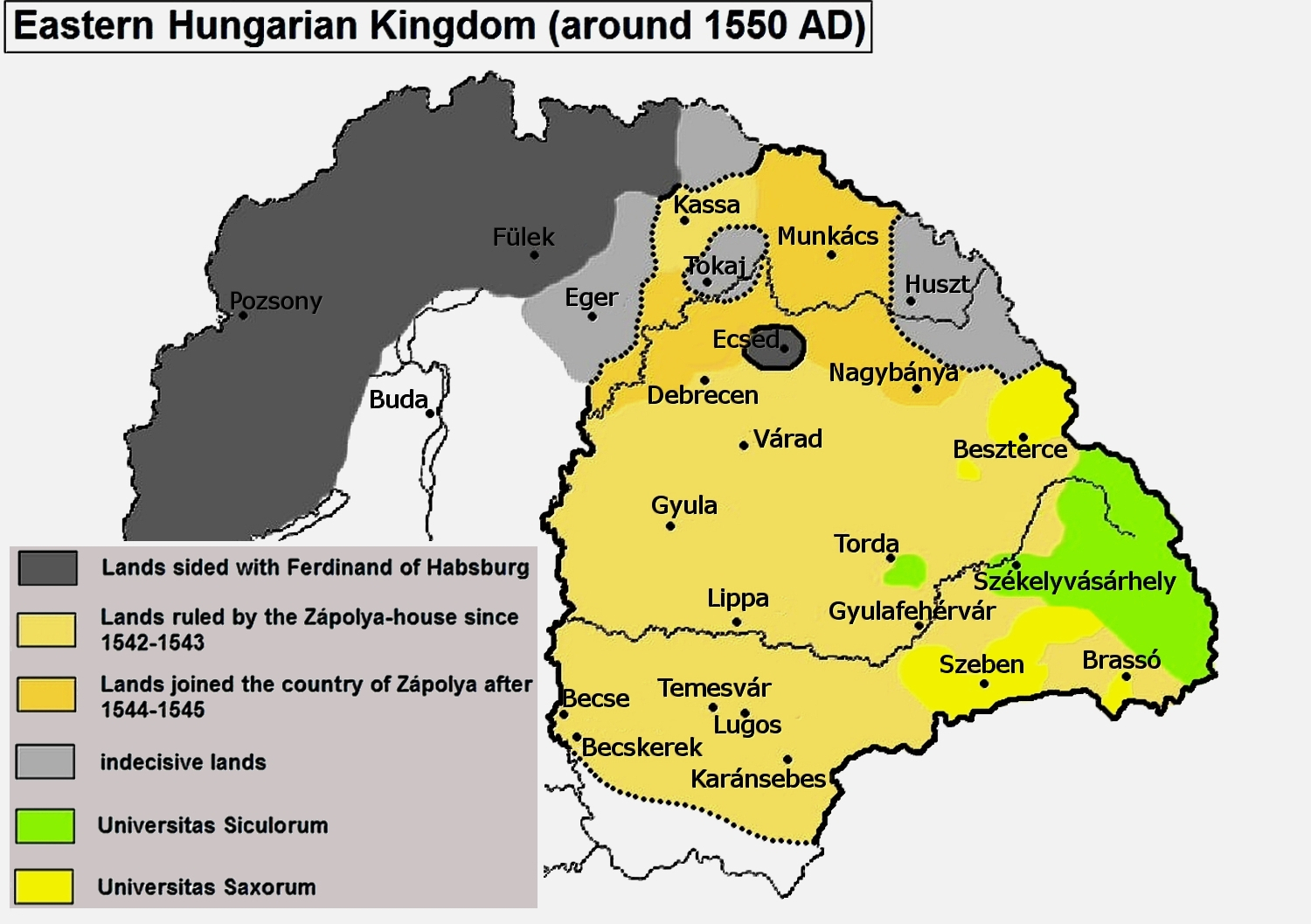
- Eastern Hungarian Kingdom around 1550
- Status: Vassal state of the Ottoman Empire
- Capital: Buda (1526–41); Lippa (now Lipova) (1541–42); Gyulafehérvár (now Alba Iulia) (1542–70)
- Demonym: Hungarian
- Government: Monarchy
- King
  - 1526–1540 (first): John I
  - 1540–1570 (last): John II
- History
  - Coronation of John I: 11 November 1526
  - John I swore fealty to the Sultan: 19 August 1529
  - Treaty of Nagyvárad: 24 February 1538
  - Treaty of Speyer: 16 August 1570
Preceded by	Succeeded by
Kingdom of Hungary (1301–1526)	Principality of Transylvania (1570–1711)

The Eastern Hungarian Kingdom (Hungarian: keleti Magyar Királyság [ˈkɛlɛti ˈmɒɟɒr ˈkiraːjʃaːg]) is a modern term coined by some historians to designate the realm of John Zápolya and his son John Sigismund Zápolya, who contested the claims of the House of Habsburg to rule the Kingdom of Hungary from 1526 to 1570. The Zápolyas ruled over an eastern part of Hungary, and the Habsburg kings (Ferdinand and Maximilian) ruled the west. The Habsburgs tried several times to unite all Hungary under their rule, but the Ottoman Empire prevented that by supporting the Eastern Hungarian Kingdom.

The exact extent of the Zápolya realm was never settled because both the Habsburgs and the Zápolyas claimed the whole kingdom. A temporary territorial division was made in the Treaty of Nagyvárad in 1538. The Eastern Hungarian Kingdom is considered the predecessor of the Principality of Transylvania (1570–1711), which was established by the Treaty of Speyer.

== John I's reign ==
In 1526, Hungary was defeated by the Ottoman Empire at the Battle of Mohács, and King Louis II of Hungary was killed. The Ottomans withdrew their troops and did not then seek to conquer.

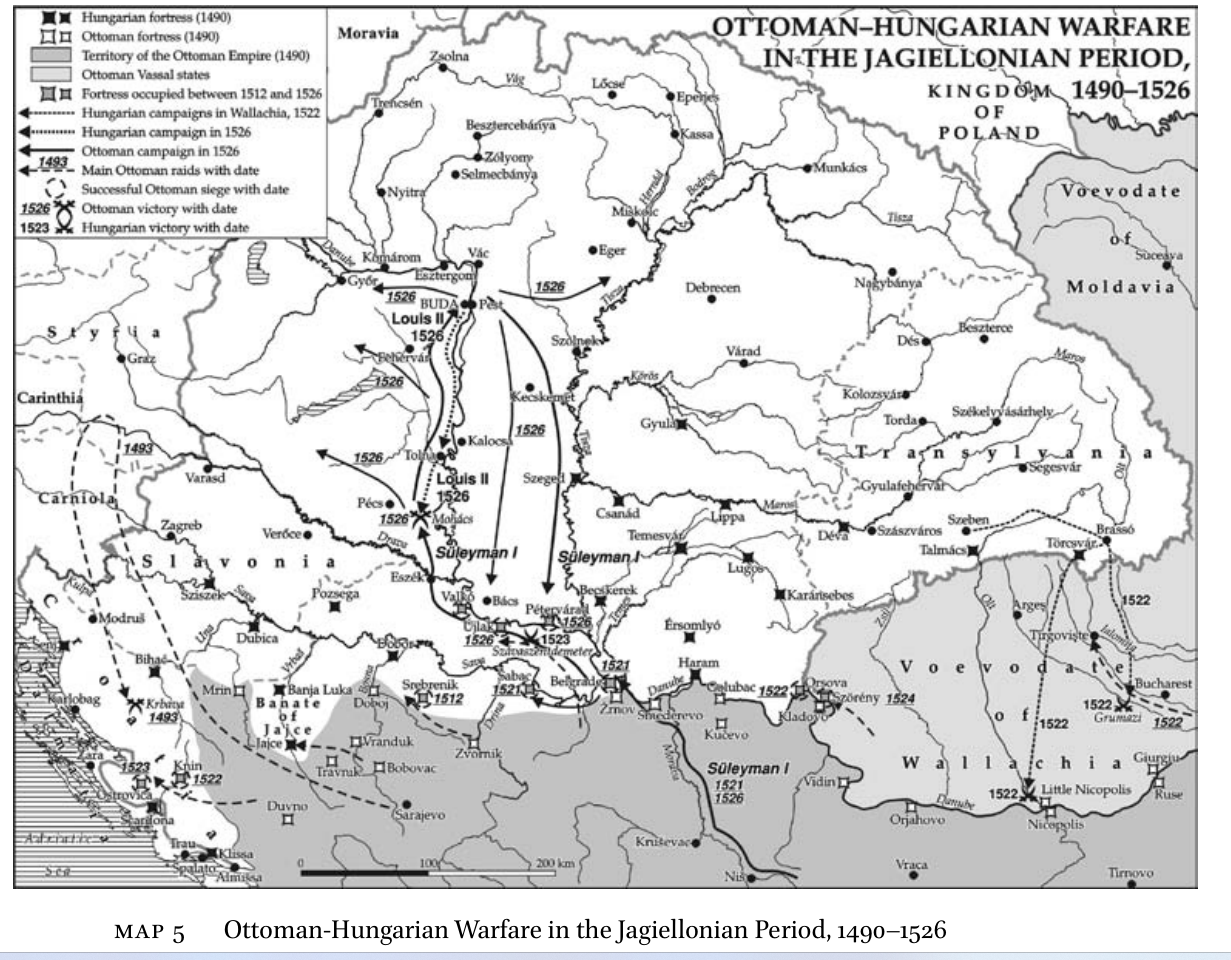
Hungarian-Ottoman war in 1526

Ferdinand of Austria, younger brother of Emperor Charles V, claimed the crown by right of his marriage to Louis' sister Anne. But most Hungarian nobles opposed Ferdinand. They supported John Zápolya, former Voivode of Transylvania, the wealthiest landholder in the country. The Hungarian Diet proclaimed him king, but Ferdinand sent an army which drove John from the country by 1528. To counter the Habsburg influence, John formed an alliance with Ottoman Sultan Suleiman I in 1528, and even swore fealty to the sultan in 1529.

John controlled Transylvania and the eastern part of the Hungarian plain; Ferdinand held Croatia, the western part of the plain, and Upper Hungary.

In 1538, the two sides signed the Treaty of Nagyvárad, which made this division official, and also made Ferdinand heir to John, who was childless.

== John II Sigismund's reign ==
The Nagyvárad agreement lasted only two years, until John I's son was born in 1540, only nine days before John I's death. The infant John II Sigismund Zápolya was crowned by the Hungarian estates a few weeks later. For much of John II's reign, Eastern Hungary was governed by his mother, Isabella, with Bishop George Martinuzzi as regent. They were supported by Sultan Suleiman, who recognized John II as king and his vassal.

In 1541, Ferdinand invaded to enforce his claim. Martinuzzi called on Suleiman, who expelled Ferdinand, but took most of central Hungary under direct Ottoman rule as Budin Province. The eastern part of the Hungarian plain remained under Zápolya rule; after 1571 it became known as Partium.

During the 1540s, the Eastern Hungarian Kingdom included the counties of Máramaros, Szabolcs, Szatmár, Közép-Szolnok, Bihar, Külső-Szolnok, Békés, Csongrád, Arad, Csanád, and the Temesköz. The bigger towns, such as Várad or Lippa, were significant centers of state power, warranting predominance over the region's magnates. One of the wealthiest nobles, Péter Petrovics, was the absolute ruler of the Temesköz, but was loyal to the Zápolya family. He cooperated with the regent Martinuzzi. The region from Máramaros County to the Kraszna river was ruled by the Drágffy-Perényi family, Ecsed and Somlyó by the Báthory family, Békés county by the Patócsy, the Maros river valley by the Jaksics family, and the town of Debrecen by the Török family of Enying. Zemplén, Borsod, and Abaúj Counties with their undefined borders were ruled by the Balassa, Losonci, Bebek, and Drugeth families, but they possessed considerable autonomy.

The army campaigns of 1543–44 left only one secure road link to Royal Hungary, along the Vág valley, and this further decreased Habsburg support in the kingdom. In August 1544, commissioners from the central parts of the medieval Hungarian kingdom as counties along the Tisza river participated as equals in the Transylvanian Diet at Torda. The Transylvanian Diet thus became the legal successor of the Hungarian Diets.

The chancellery and the high court at Buda disappeared during the political chaos of 1540-41 and Transylvania could not be administered by the central organs of the Hungarian Kingdom anymore. The apparatus of the voivode was inadequate to provide the task of administering a state. Martinuzzi formed a new administrative structure, and established the court at Gyulafehérvár.

The feudal estates lost their power over cases of state. The Saxons were still Habsburg supporters and adopted a passive stance. Péter Haller, the royal magistrate at Szeben, was the only Saxon at the court of Gyulafehérvár. The Székelys had only few advocates in the circles around the regent and the queen. King John's supporters usually had no roots within the new confines of the country, however their relatives were found among the senior officials and courtiers in large numbers. The ruling class still expected the reunification of the country, and Martinuzzi always encountered the pressure of this wish and expectation.

=== Habsburg rule and war ===
Martinuzzi and Isabella fell out, and Martinuzzi also turned against the Ottomans. He allied instead with Ferdinand, and compelled Isabella to sign the Treaty of Nyírbátor in 1549, which ceded Transylvania to Ferdinand. Isabella opposed the dispossession of her son and informed the sultan immediately. A civil war followed between Isabella's forces and Martinuzzi's pro-Habsburg troops. Martinuzzi's army besieged the royal residence at Gyulafehérvár in 1550 and 1551.

A Habsburg army marched into Transylvania and the Tisza region, under Giovanni Battista Castaldo. Martinuzzi continued his intrigues, sending feudal tribute to the sultan, and was killed by Castaldo in 1551. John II abdicated as king, and together with Isabella left for Poland.

The sultan, feeling betrayed, sent his army against Hungary in 1552. Veszprém, Drégely, Szolnok, Lippa, Temesvár, Karánsebes, and Lugos fell in the course of the campaign. Only Eger castle, commanded by István Dobó, withstood the Ottoman army. In 1553, Ferdinand withdrew Castaldo's troops from Transylvania. In 1554 the sultan launched another attack against Hungary, occupying Salgó and Fülek.

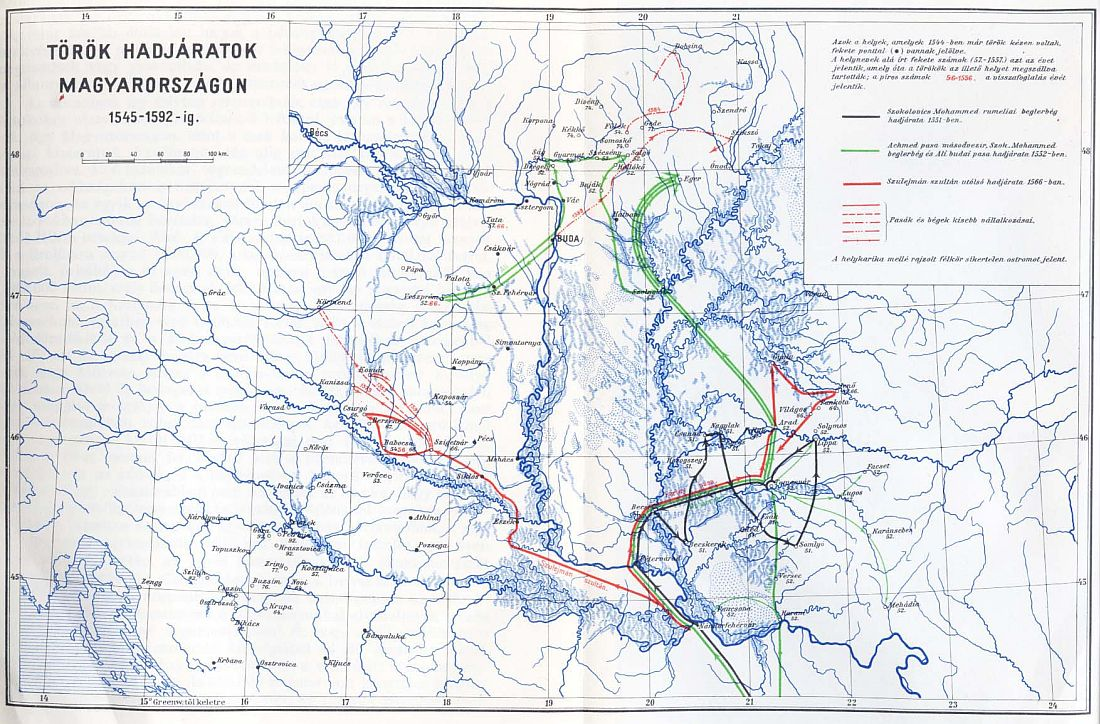
Ottoman campaigns in Hungarian kingdom 1545-1592

=== Restoration of John II ===
In 1556 the nobles of Transylvania recalled John II, and elected him Prince of Transylvania at the Diet of Szászsebes; also again acknowledging him as King.

On this day we have by our common will elected the son of our late King John as our Prince and King, and we will loyally serve his majesty and master now and in times to come.

In 1568, freedom of religion was formally recognized by John II in the Edict of Torda.

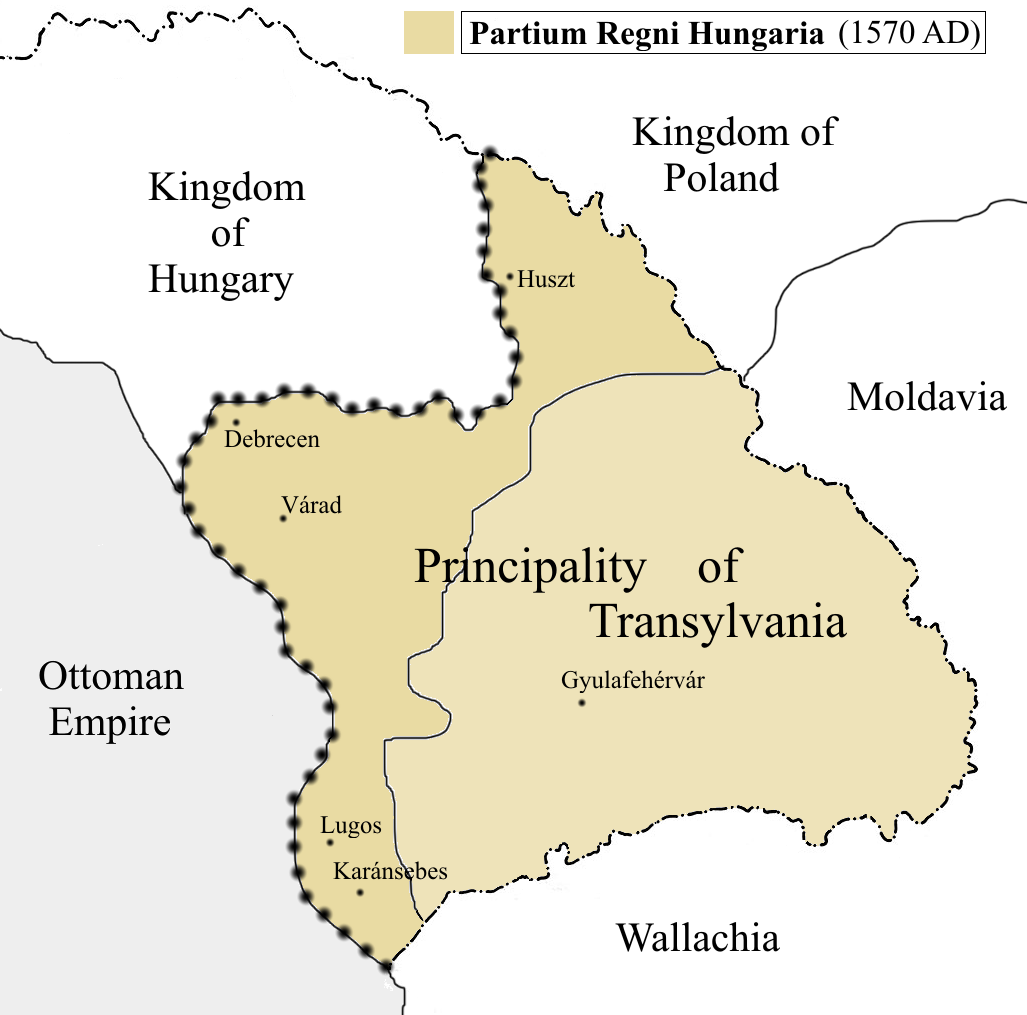
The Principality of Transylvania, the successor of Eastern Hungarian Kingdom (1570). Partium is depicted in the darker color

== Treaty of Speyer ==
In 1570, John II signed the Treaty of Speyer with Ferdinand's successor, Maximilian. John II again renounced his claim as king of Hungary in favor of Maximilian, thus ending the Eastern Hungarian Kingdom. John instead was recognized by Maximilian as "prince of Transylvania and the Partium" (princeps Transsylvaniae et partium regni Hungariae dominus; that is, "Prince of Transylvania and Lord of part of the Kingdom of Hungary") from 1570 until his death (1571).

This treaty, like the earlier Treaty of Nagyvárad, endorsed the principle of a united Hungary. Partium and Transylvania were entrusted to John Sigismund Zápolya, as a vassal of Maximilian. As mentioned above, the Zápolyas had already held the Partium, but now the Habsburgs recognized their lordship. In a sense, John Sigismund traded title for territory.

Thus the Eastern Hungarian Kingdom became the predecessor of the Principality of Transylvania (1570–1711). Despite John Sigismund's profession of vassalage to Maximilian, the princes of Transylvania ruled with near complete autonomy, and often paid tribute to the Ottoman Empire. Austria and Turkey contended for supremacy there for nearly two centuries. All reference after 1570 to the king of Hungary refer to the territory known as "Royal Hungary"; references to a prince refer to the "Principality of Transylvania".

== See also ==
- Little War in Hungary
- List of Hungarian rulers
- Kingdom of Hungary in the Middle Ages
- Ottoman Hungary
- Ottomans
- Habsburgs

== Sources ==
- Barta, Gábor (1994). "The Emergence of the Principality and its First Crises (1526–1606)". In Köpeczi, Béla; Barta, Gábor; Bóna, István; Makkai, László; Szász, Zoltán; Borus, Judit (eds.). History of Transylvania. Akadémiai Kiadó. pp. 247–300.
- Dávid, Géza; Fodor, Pál, eds. (1994). Hungarian-Ottoman Military and Diplomatic Relations in the Age of Süleyman the Magnificent. Budapest: Loránd Eötvös University, Hungarian Academy of Sciences, Institute of History. ISBN 9789638312310.
- Fodor, Pál; Dávid, Géza, eds. (2000). Ottomans, Hungarians, and Habsburgs in Central Europe: The Military Confines in the Era of Ottoman Conquest. Leiden: BRILL. ISBN 9004119078.
- Gavrilović, Slavko (1993). "Serbs in Hungary, Slavonia and Croatia in struggles against the Turks (15th-18th centuries)". Serbs in European Civilization. Belgrade: Nova, Serbian Academy of Sciences and Arts, Institute for Balkan Studies. pp. 41–54. ISBN 9788675830153.
