= Ottoman–Habsburg wars =

1526–1791 series of wars in Europe

- Part of the Ottoman wars in Europe and Spanish–Ottoman wars
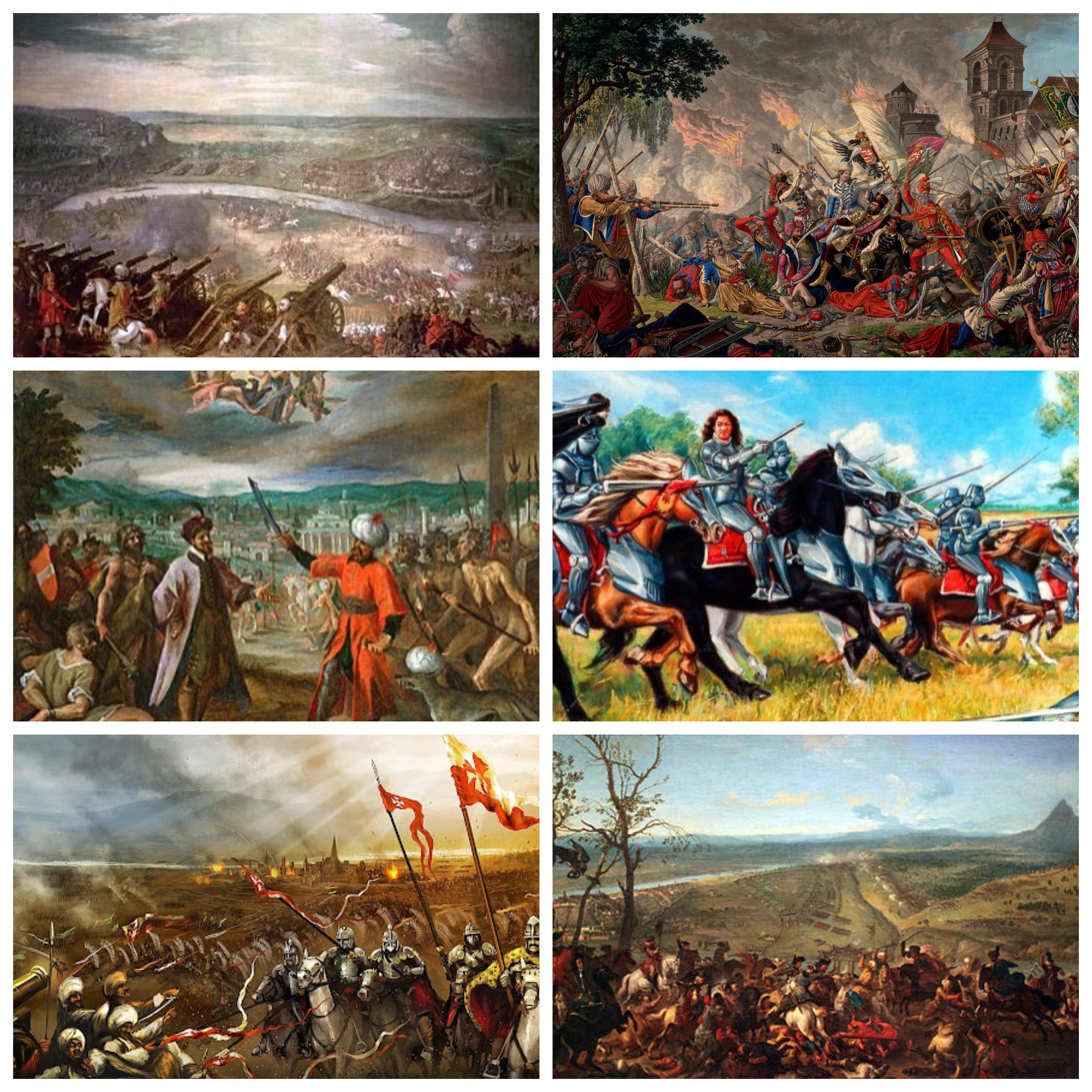
- Left to right from the top: the siege of Vienna, the siege of Szigetvár, the Long Turkish War, the Battle of Saint Gotthard, the Battle of Vienna, the siege of Belgrade
Date	29 August 1526 – 4 August 1791 (264 years, 11 months, 6 days)
Location	Central and Eastern Europe, Mediterranean
Result	Habsburg victory
Territorial changes	End of Ottoman expansion; The Habsburgs conquer all of the former Kingdom of Hungary by 1718; Rise of Habsburg Austria to great power status alongside the decline of the Ottoman Empire

Belligerents
Ottoman Empire Vassal states: Regency of Algiers; Ait Abbas; Kuku; Crimean Khanate; Moldavia; Wallachia; Transylvania; Cossack Hetmanate (Doroshenko's faction); Eastern Hungary; Upper Hungary; Transylvania-Hungary; Kurucs (Hungary); Hajduk rebels; Allies: France; Sultanate of Aceh; Székelys; Nogai Horde; Corsicans; Sultanate of Sulu	Habsburg monarchy: Holy Roman Empire; Archduchy of Austria; Bohemia; Duchy of Carniola; Flanders; Hungary; Croatia; Serbia; Spanish Empire: Spain; Sardinia; Naples; Philippines; Sicily; Portugal; Non-Habsburg states of the Holy Roman Empire: Saxony; Electoral Palatinate; Electorate of Bavaria; Brandenburg-Prussia; Savoy-Sardinia; Tuscany; Republic of Genoa; Mantua; Montferrat; Order of St. George; Non-Habsburg allies: Safavid Empire: Moldavia; Transylvania; Wallachia; Russian Empire; Cossack Hetmanate; Portugal; Hafsid Tunisia; Montenegro; Hajduk; Holy League allies: Polish-Lithuanian Commonwealth; Republic of Venice; (Sovereign Military Order of Malta) Order of Malta; Papal States; Urbino; Order of St. Lazarus; Ferrara; Order of St. Stephen

Casualties and losses
- Mediterranean: 900,000–1,000,000 deaths (1470–1574)

The Ottoman–Habsburg wars were fought from the 16th to the 18th centuries between the Ottoman Empire and the Habsburg monarchy, which was at times supported by the Kingdom of Hungary, Polish–Lithuanian Commonwealth, the Holy Roman Empire, and Habsburg Spain. The wars were dominated by land campaigns in Hungary, including Transylvania (today in Romania) and Vojvodina (today in Serbia), Croatia, and central Serbia.

By the 16th century, the Ottomans had become a serious threat to European powers, with Ottoman ships sweeping away Venetian possessions in the Aegean and Ionian seas and Ottoman-supported Barbary pirates seizing Spanish colonies in the Maghreb. The Protestant Reformation, French–Habsburg rivalry and the numerous civil conflicts of the Holy Roman Empire distracted Christians from their conflict with the Ottomans. Meanwhile, the Ottomans had to contend with the Safavid Empire and also to a lesser extent the Mamluk Sultanate, which was defeated by the Ottomans under Selim I and later fully incorporated into the empire.

Initially, the Ottoman conquests in Europe made significant gains with a decisive victory at Mohács, and reducing around one third of central Hungary to the status of an Ottoman tributary. Later, the Peace of Westphalia and the War of the Spanish Succession, in the 17th and 18th centuries respectively, left the Austrian Empire as the sole firm possession of the House of Habsburg. After the siege of Vienna in 1683, the Habsburgs assembled a large coalition of European powers known as the Holy League to fight the Ottomans and regain control over Hungary. The Great Turkish War ended with the decisive Holy League victory at Zenta. The wars ended after Austria's participation in the war of 1787–1791, which Austria fought allied with Russia. Intermittent tension between Austria and the Ottoman Empire continued throughout the nineteenth century, but they never fought each other in a war and ultimately found themselves allied in World War I, after which both empires were dissolved.

Historians have focused on the second siege of Vienna of 1683, depicting it as a decisive Austrian victory that saved Western civilization and marked the decline of the Ottoman Empire. Recent historians have taken a broader perspective, noting that the Habsburgs at the same time resisted internal separatist movements and were fighting Prussia and France for control of central Europe. The key advance made by the Europeans was an effective combined arms doctrine involving the cooperation of infantry, artillery and cavalry. Nevertheless, the Ottomans were able to maintain military parity with the Habsburgs until the middle of the eighteenth century. Historian Gunther E. Rothenberg has emphasized the non-combat dimension of the conflict, in which the Habsburgs built up military communities that protected their borders and produced a steady flow of well-trained, motivated soldiers.

== Origins ==
While the Habsburgs were occasionally the Kings of Hungary and Emperors of the Holy Roman Empire (almost always of the Holy Roman Empire after the 15th century), the wars between the Hungarians and the Ottomans included other dynasties as well. Naturally, the Ottoman Wars in Europe attracted support from the West, where the advancing and powerful Islamic state was seen as a threat to Christendom in Europe. The Crusades of Nicopolis (1396) and of Varna (1443–44) marked the most determined attempts by Europe to halt the Turkic advance into Central Europe and the Balkans.

For a while the Ottomans were too busy trying to put down Balkan rebels such as Vlad Dracula and Skanderbeg. However, the defeat of these and other rebellious vassal states opened up central Europe to Ottoman invasion. The Kingdom of Hungary now bordered the Ottoman Empire and its vassals.

The Ottoman conquest of Bosnia in 1463 brought their frontier closer to the Habsburg lands under Frederick III, setting the stage for more intense incursions. The Ottomans raided Carniola in 1469 and launched almost annual raids into Styria after 1471. Carinthia saw five Turkish incursions into its territory between 1473 and 1483, with much plundering and killing at the hands of Ottoman cavalry. These raids led to the Carinthian Peasant Revolt of 1478, as peasants, left unprotected by the nobility, tried to defend themselves and formed a peasants' league to organize their own defense. The raids also prompted the construction of defensive structures like fortified churches and castles (tabor). In 1491, Ottoman raids in the Habsburg territories of Styria and Carniola ended after a significant Ottoman defeat by the Kingdom of Croatia at the Battle of Vrpile.

After King Louis II of Hungary was killed at the Battle of Mohács in 1526, his widow Queen Mary of Austria fled to her brother the Archduke of Austria, Ferdinand I. Ferdinand's claim to the throne of Hungary was further strengthened by his marriage to Anne, the sister of King Louis II and the only family member claimant to the throne of the shattered kingdom. Consequently, Ferdinand I was elected King of Bohemia, and at the Diet of Pozsony he and his wife were elected king and queen of Hungary. However another assembly of the nobility elected John Zápolya, who as the voivode of Transylvania had gained popularity among the magnates (and who had closer ties to the Ottoman Sultan), setting the stage for a conflict between the Hapsburgs and the Ottoman Empire.

== List of Habsburg-Ottoman conflicts ==
Austro-Ottoman conflicts			Spanish-Ottoman Mediterranean conflicts		
Name	Date	Result	Name	Date	Result
Battle of Mohács	1526	Ottoman victory	Algiers expedition (1516)	1516	Ottoman victory
Habsburg–Ottoman war (1529–1533)	1529–1533	Ottoman victory	Conquest of Tunis (1535)	1535	Spanish victory
Habsburg–Ottoman war (1534–1537)	1534–1537	Ottoman victory	Apulia expedition (1537)	1537	Ottoman victory
Habsburg–Ottoman war (1540–1547)	1540–1547	Ottoman victory	Battle of Preveza (1538)	1538	Ottoman victory
Habsburg–Ottoman war (1551–1562)	1551–1562	Ottoman victory	Algiers expedition (1541)	1541	Ottoman victory
Habsburg–Ottoman war (1565–1568)	1565–1568	Ottoman victory	Siege of Nice (1543)	1543	Christian victory
Long Turkish War	1593–1606	Inconclusive	Expedition to Mostaganem (1558)	1558	Ottoman victory
Austro-Turkish War (1663–1664)	1663–1664	Ottoman victory	Battle of Djerba (1560)	1560	Ottoman victory
Great Turkish War	1683–1699	Habsburg victory	Siege of Oran (1563)	1563	Spanish victory
Austro-Turkish War (1716–1718)	1716–1718	Habsburg victory	Great Siege of Malta (1565)	1565	Christian victory
Austro-Turkish War (1737–1739)	1737–1739	Ottoman victory	Battle of Lepanto (1571)	1571	Christian victory
Austro-Turkish War (1788–1791)	1788–1791	Inconclusive	Conquest of Tunis (1574)	1574	Ottoman victory

== Habsburg advance ==
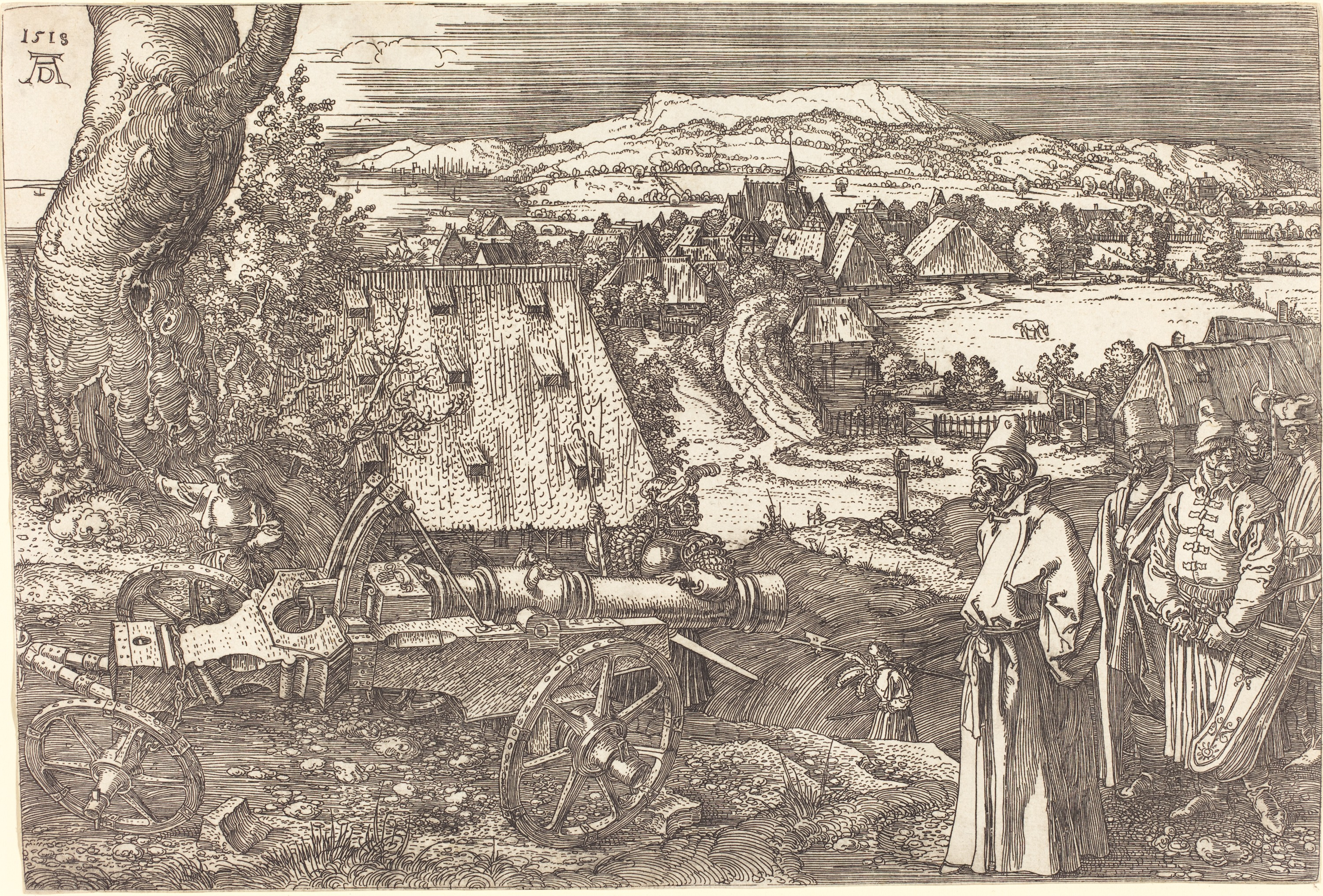
"The Great Gun" (1518), an allegorical representation by Albrecht Dürer of the Turkish menace for the German lands

The Austrian lands were in miserable economic and financial conditions, thus Ferdinand desperately introduced the so-called Turkish Tax (Türkensteuer). Despite this, he was not able to collect enough money to pay the expenses of the defense costs of the Austrian lands. His annual revenues only allowed him to hire 5,000 mercenaries for two months, thus Ferdinand asked help from his brother Charles V, Holy Roman Emperor, and started to borrow money from rich bankers like the Fugger family.

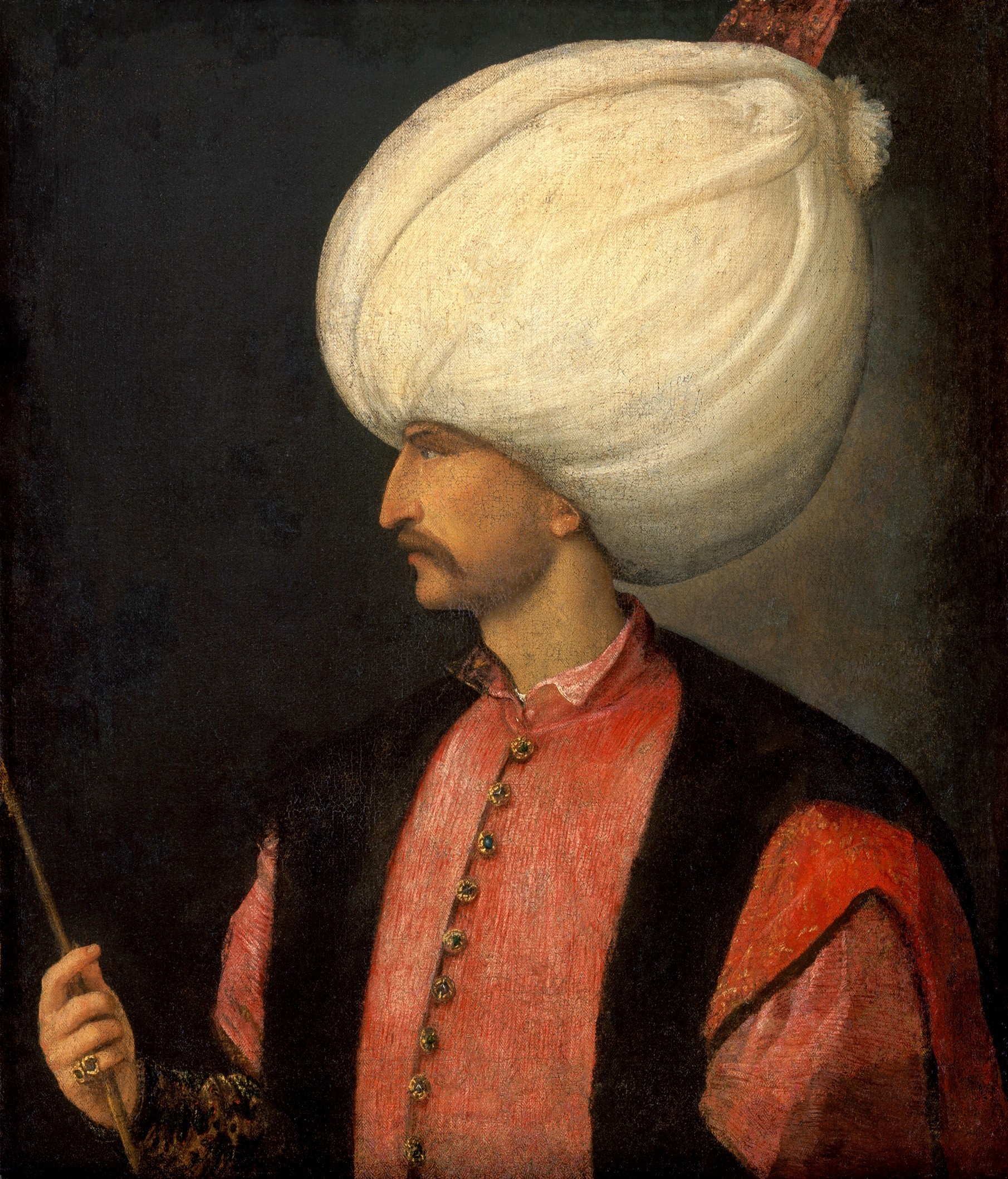
Ottoman sultan Suleiman the Magnificent in 1530, by Titian.

Ferdinand I attacked Hungary, a state severely weakened by civil conflict, in 1527, in an attempt to drive out John Zápolya and enforce his authority there. John was unable to prevent Ferdinand's campaigning, which led to the capture of Buda and several other key settlements along the Danube. Despite this, the Ottoman sultan was slow to react and only came to the aid of his vassal when he launched an army of about 120,000 men on 10 May 1529. The Austrian branch of Habsburg monarchs needed the economic power of Hungary for the Ottoman wars. During the Ottoman wars the territory of former Kingdom of Hungary shrunk by around 70%; despite these territorial and demographic losses, the smaller, heavily war-torn Royal Hungary remained economically more important than Austria or Kingdom of Bohemia at the end of the 16th century, as it was Ferdinand's largest source of revenue.

== Technological advantage of the Western Christian forces ==
The earliest type of Turkish hand cannons are called as "Şakaloz", the word came from the Hungarian hand cannon "Szakállas puska" in the 15th century.

Although Ottoman Janissaries adopted firearms in battles since the beginning of the 16th century, the Ottoman usage of the handheld firearms spread much more slowly than in the Western Christian armies. Wheellock firearms were unfamiliar for Ottoman soldiers until the siege of Székesfehérvár in 1543, despite the fact they had been used for decades by Christian armies in Kingdom of Hungary and in Western Europe. According to a report from 1594, the Ottoman soldiers had not adopted the pistol yet.

In 1602, the grand vizier reported from Hungarian front about the firepower superiority of the Christian forces:

"in a field or during a siege we are in distressed position, because the greater part of the enemy forces are infantry armed with muskets, while the majority of our forces are horsemen, and we have very few specialists skilled in the musket"

According to Alvise Foscarini's (Venetian ambassador in Constantinople) report in 1637,

"few Janissaries even knew how to use an arquebus"

== Siege of Vienna ==
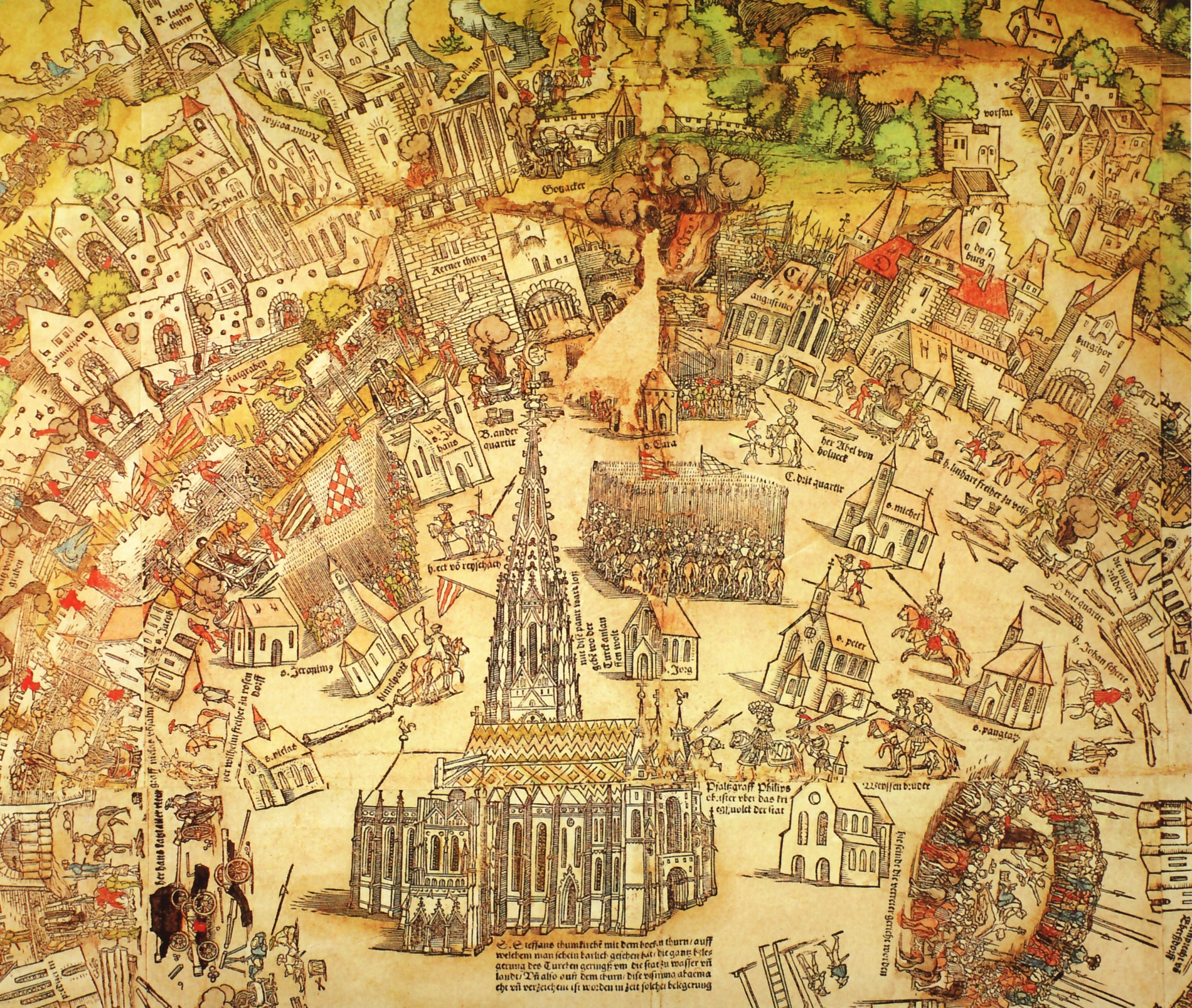
The Ottomans were unable to overcome the long pike formations and arquebus fire of the defenders in the siege of Vienna (1529)

Ottoman sultan Suleiman the Magnificent easily wrested from Ferdinand most of the gains he had achieved in the previous two years – to the disappointment of Ferdinand I, only the fortress of Pozsony resisted. Considering the size of Suleiman's army and the devastation wrought upon Hungary in the previous few years it is not surprising that the will to resist one of the world's most powerful states was lacking in many of the recently garrisoned Habsburg settlements.

The Sultan arrived at Vienna on 27 September 1529. Ferdinand's army was some 16,000 strong – he was outnumbered roughly 7 to 1 and the walls of Vienna were an invitation to Ottoman cannon (6 ft thick along some parts). However, the heavy cannons on which the Ottomans relied to breach the walls were all abandoned on the way to Vienna, after they got stuck in mud due to heavy rainfall. Ferdinand defended Vienna with great vigour. By 12 October, after much mining and counter-mining an Ottoman war council was called and on 14 October the Ottomans abandoned the siege. The retreat of the Ottoman army was hampered by the resistance of Pozsony, which attempted to attack Ottoman forces. Early snowfall made matters worse, and it would be another three years before Suleiman could campaign in Hungary.

== Little War ==
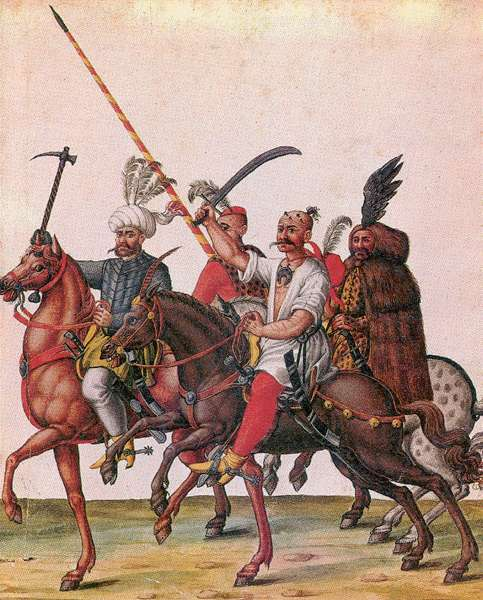
The Ottoman army consisted of both heavy and missile fire, cavalry and infantry, making it both versatile and powerful.

After the defeat at Vienna, the Ottoman Sultan had to turn his attention to other parts of his domain. Taking advantage of this absence, Archduke Ferdinand launched an offensive in 1530, recapturing Esztergom and other forts. An assault on Buda was only thwarted by the presence of Ottoman Turkish soldiers.

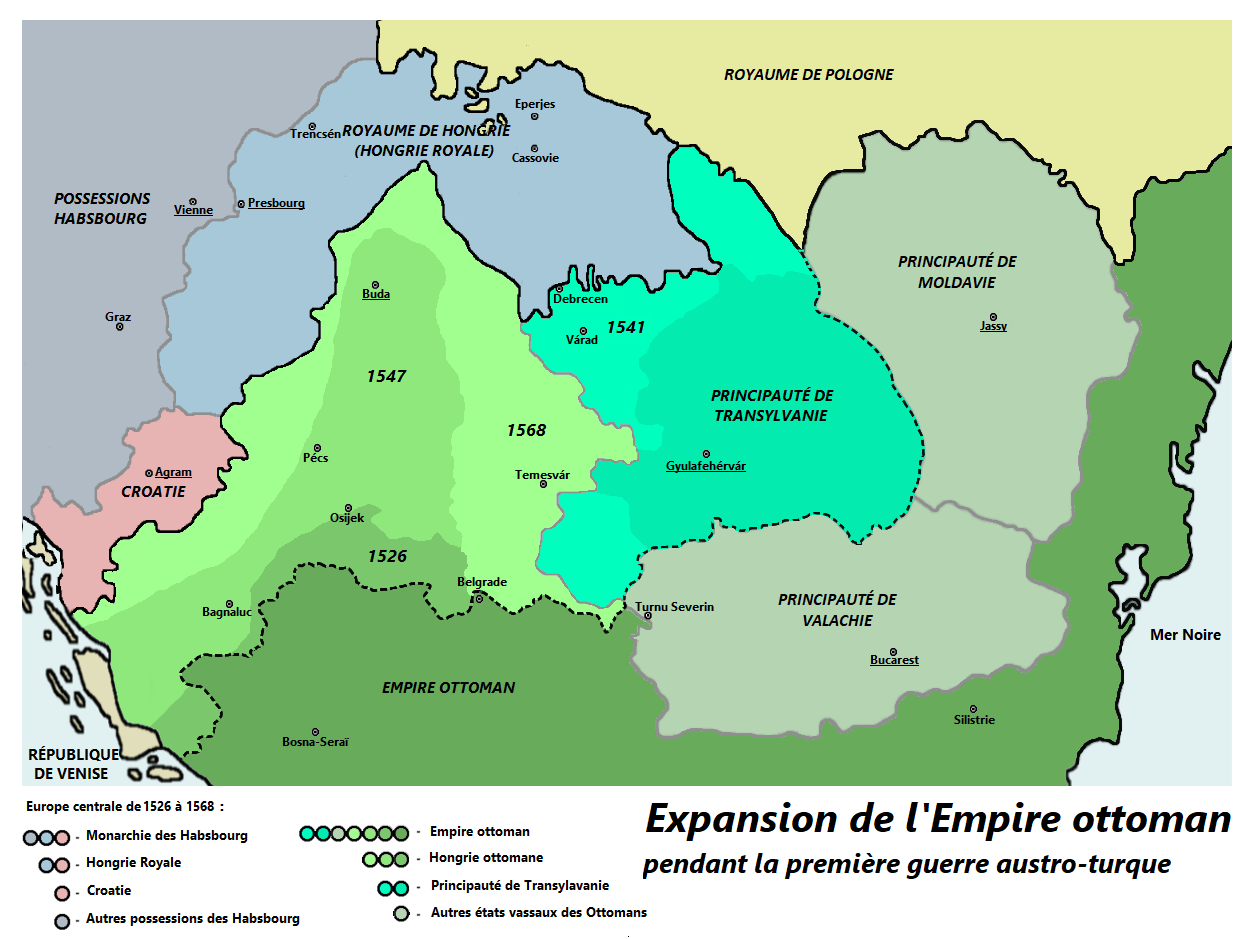
Expansion of the Ottoman empire(1526-1568)

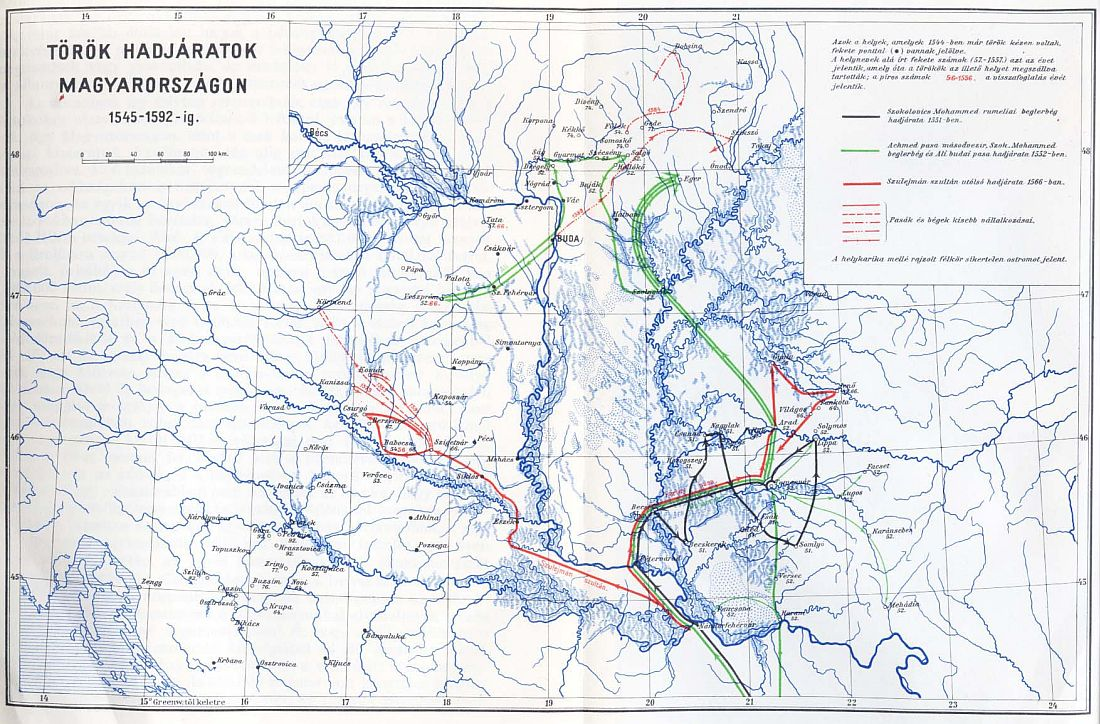
Ottoman wars in the territory of the Hungarian kingdom against the Habsburg empire 1545-1592 aftermath the permanent Ottoman occupation

As in the previous Austrian offensive, the return of the Ottomans forced the Habsburgs in Austria to go on the defensive. In 1532, Suleiman sent a massive Ottoman army to take Vienna. However, the army took a different route to Kőszeg and was defeated at the Siege of Güns by a mere 700-strong force led by the Croatian earl Nikola Jurišić. Historians have argued that the siege was an excuse rather than a real reason for the caliph's retreat; Arguing instead that Suleiman was demoralized by the mobilization of a large Habsburg army personally commanded by Charles V, Ferdinand's older brother, in Vienna. After the Ottoman retreat, the Sultan was forced to recognize the Ferdinand's gains in Hungary, while forcing Ferdinand to recognize John Zápolya as King of Hungary. Tatar raiders plundered Lower Austria and carried off many people into slavery. However, a massive contingent of these Ottoman raiders was entrapped and annihilated at the Battle of Leobersdorf.

While the peace between the Austrians and the Ottomans would last for nine years, John Zápolya and Ferdinand found it convenient to continue skirmishes along their respective borders. In early 1537, the Ottoman sanjak-bey of Bosnia, Gazi Husrev-beg, occupied the town of Požega in Slavonia. Ferdinand, under pressure from the local nobility, decided to respond by launching an offensive in Slavonia in 1537, sending one of his ablest generals to take Osijek. The siege failed and led to the Battle of Gorjani, which was another Ottoman triumph. Nevertheless, Ferdinand was recognized by the Treaty of Nagyvárad as the heir of the Kingdom of Hungary.

After the death of John Zápolya in 1540, Ferdinand's inheritance was robbed, given instead to John's son, John Sigismund Zápolya. Attempting to enforce the treaty, the Austrians advanced on Buda where they experienced another defeat by Suleiman; the elderly Austrian General Wilhelm von Roggendorf proved to be incompetent. Suleiman then finished off the remaining Austrian troops and proceeded to de facto annex Hungary. By the time a peace treaty was enforced in 1551, Habsburg Hungary had been reduced to little more than border land.

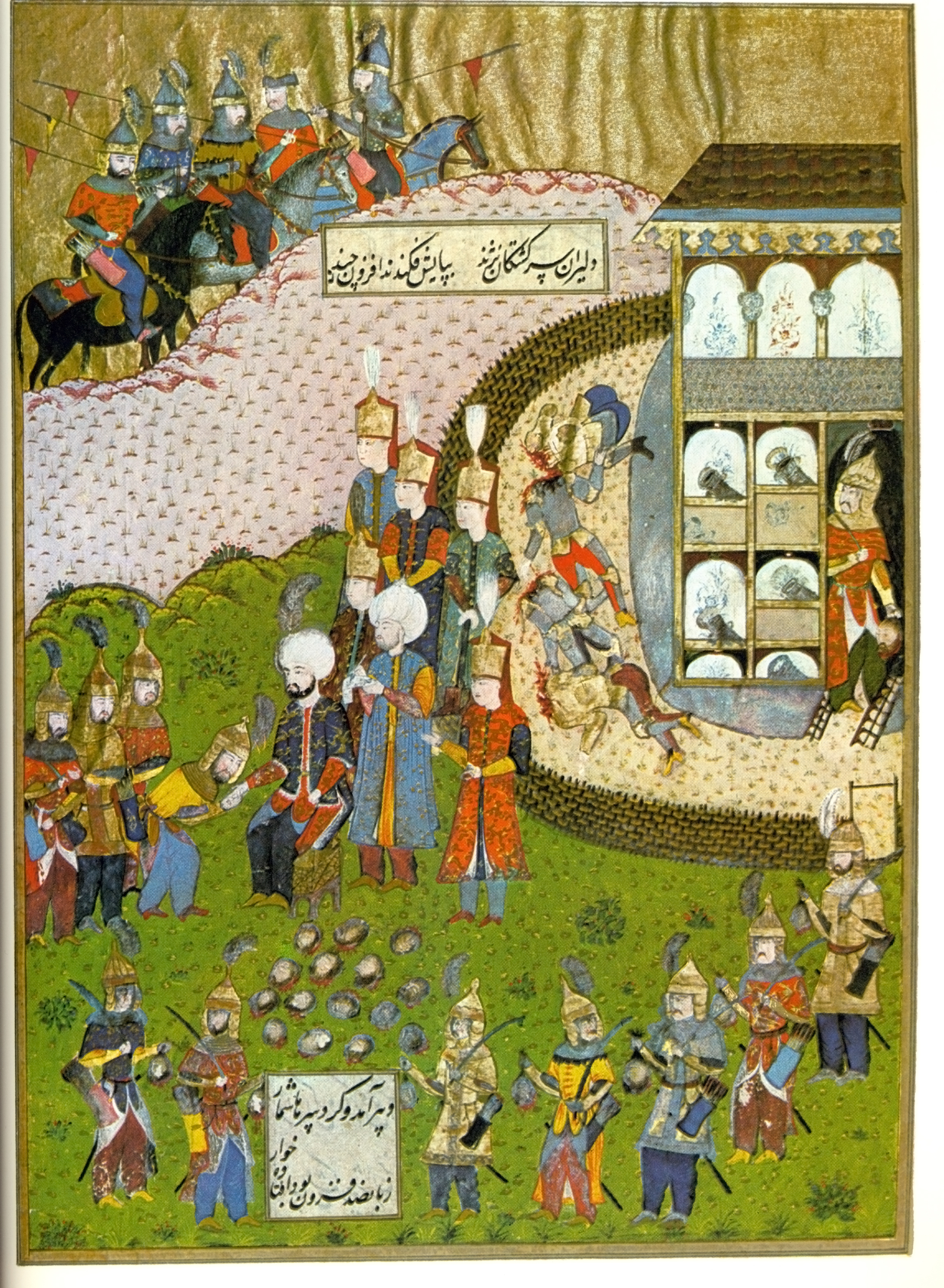
After the capture of Temesvár, 1552

In 1552 two Ottoman armies crossed the border into the Hungarian kingdom. One of them – led by Hadim Ali Pasha – started a campaign against the western and central part of the country while the second army – led by Kara Ahmed Pasha – attacked the fortresses in the Banat region. Ottoman troops conquered nine-tenths of the castles in the Hont and Nógrád counties. The Habsburg army under Erasmus von Teufel made a belated attempt to stop the Ottoman troops at Plášťovce (then Palást), but was completely defeated in a two-day battle of Palást, and 4,000 German and Italian prisoners were deported to Constantinople. The two armies united under Szolnok, then besieged and conquered the Szolnok Castle, and turned against the gate of Upper Hungary, Eger. At the end of the July there was an enormous gap in the Hungarian border castle system.

In September 1552 the forces of the Ottoman Empire led by Kara Ahmed Pasha laid siege to Eger Castle, located in the northern part of the Kingdom of Hungary, but the defenders led by István Dobó repelled the attacks and defended the castle. The siege of Eger (1552) become an emblem of national defense and patriotic heroism in Hungary's occupations

By orders of the king in 1553 and 1578, large areas of Croatia adjacent to the Ottoman Empire were carved out into the Military Frontier (Vojna krajina or Vojna granica) and ruled directly from Vienna's military headquarters. In the zone of the Croatian Military Frontier, the Habsburg king-emperors promised free land and freedom of religion to people who came to the area with the majority of the population being Serbs and Vlachs. Carinthian, Carniolan and Styrian nobility agreed to partially finance the Military Frontier in order to hold off the Ottomans in Croatia/Slavonia and therefore prevent them from invading their own lands.

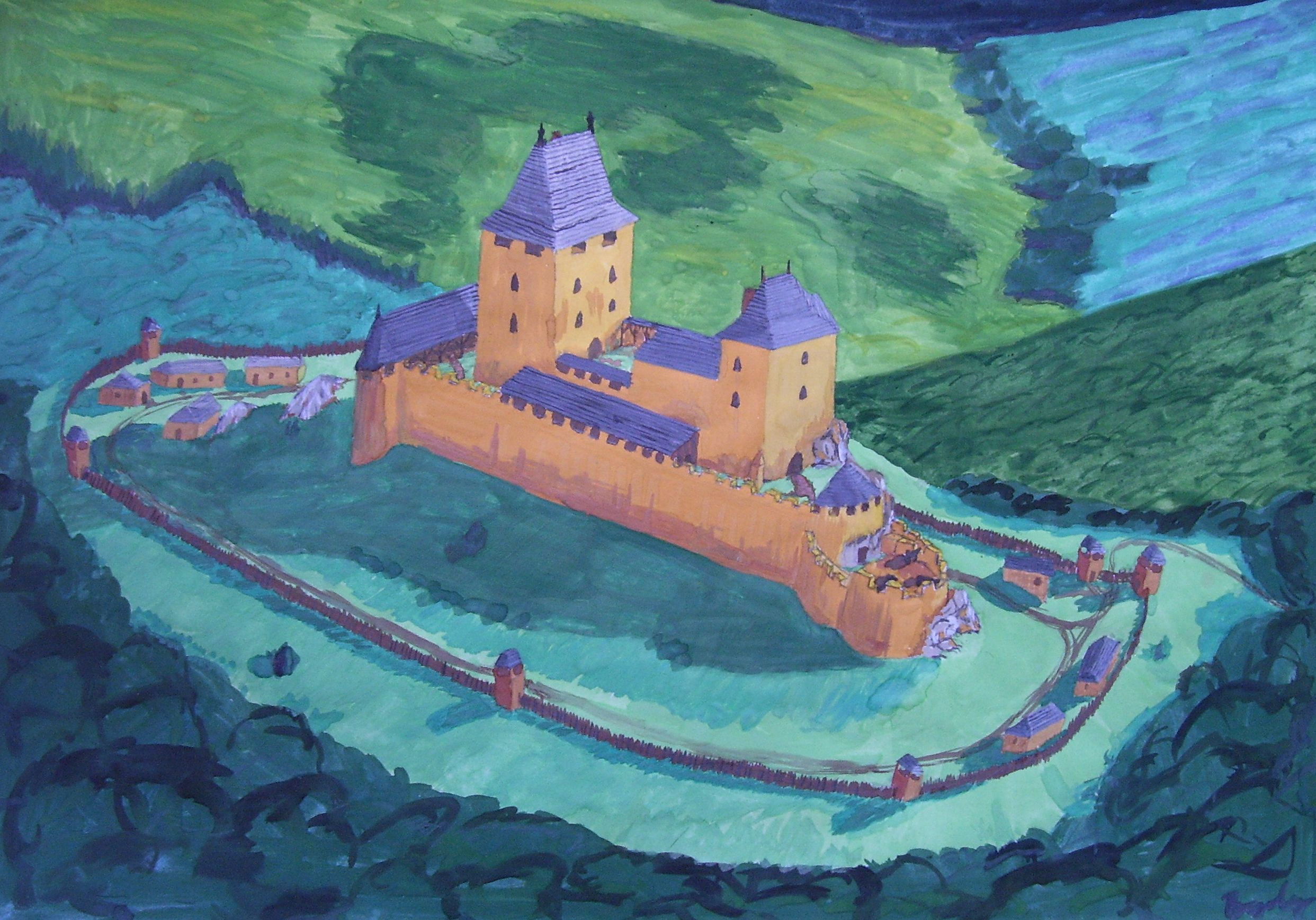
Drégely Castle was defended by the Hungarians to the last man in 1552

In 1554, the town of Fiľakovo in south-central Slovakia with the castle of the same name was conquered by the Turks and was the seat of a sanjak until 1593, when it was reconquered by the Imperial troops. On 27 March 1562, Hasszán, the sanjak-bey of Fülek (Fiľakovo) castle, defeated the Hungarian army of the Upper Lands at the Battle of Szécsény.

After the seizure of Buda by the Turks in 1541, west and north Hungary recognized a Habsburg as king ("Royal Hungary"), while the central and southern counties were occupied by the Sultan ("Ottoman Hungary"), and the east became the Principality of Transylvania. The vast majority of the seventeen and nineteen thousands Ottoman soldiers in service in the Ottoman fortresses in the territory of Hungary were Orthodox and Muslim Balkan Slavs instead of ethnic Turkish people. Southern Slavs were also acting as akinjis and other light troops intended for pillaging in the territory of present-day Hungary.

There were wasted opportunities on both sides in the Little War; Austrian attempts to increase their influence in Hungary were just as unsuccessful as the Ottoman drives to Vienna. Nonetheless, there were no illusions as to the status quo: the Ottoman Empire was still a very powerful and dangerous threat. Even so, the Austrians would go on the offensive again, their generals building a bloody reputation for so much loss of life. Costly battles like those fought at Buda and Osijek were avoided but not absent in the upcoming conflicts. In any case Habsburg interests were split between fighting for devastated European land under Islamic control, trying to stop the gradual decentralization of Imperial authority in Germany, and for Spain's ambitions in North Africa, the Low Countries and against the French. Nevertheless, the Ottomans, while hanging on to their supreme power, could not expand as they had in the days of Mehmet and Bayezid. To the east lay further wars against their Shi'ite opponents, the Safavids. Both the French (since 1536) and the Dutch (since 1612) occasionally worked together against the Habsburgs with the Ottomans.

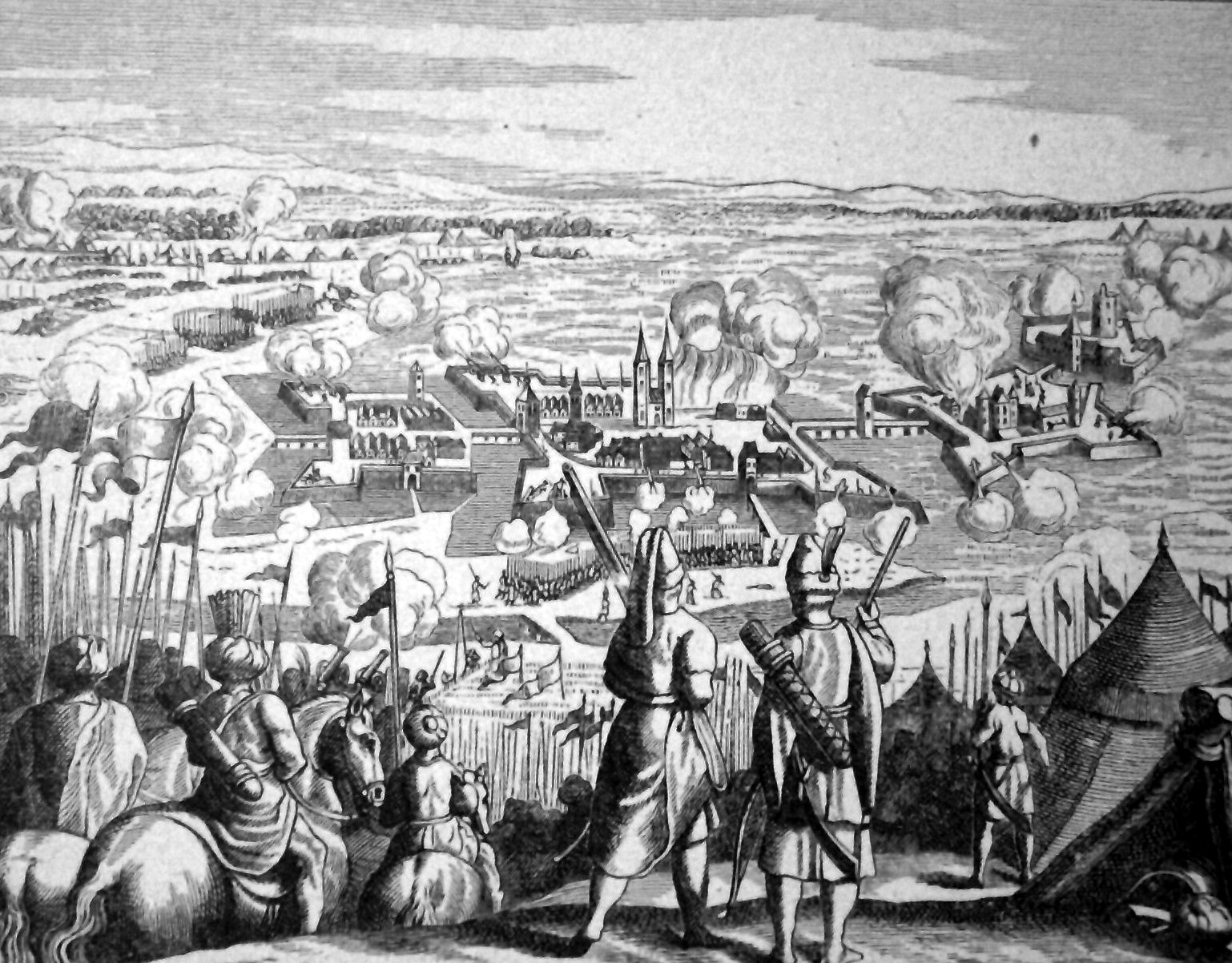
Turkish attack on river fortress, siege of Szigetvár, 1566

Suleiman the Magnificent led one final campaign in 1566, ending at the siege of Szigetvár. The siege was meant to be only a temporary stop before taking on Vienna. However, the fortress withstood against the Sultan's armies. Eventually the Sultan, already an old man at 72 years (ironically campaigning to restore his health), died. The Royal Physician was strangled to prevent news from reaching the troops and the unaware Ottomans took the fort, ending the campaign shortly afterward without making a move against Vienna.

Peace was finally concluded in Adrianople in 1568 and renewed in 1576, 1584, and 1591. War would not again break out between the Habsburgs and Ottomans until 1593, in the Long Turkish War. However, throughout this period of peace small-scale warfare continued, a conflict known as the "Little War" (German: Kleinkrieg). In 1571 the Turks destroyed the Hodejov castle and in 1575 they conquered the Modrý Kameň castle. In 1588 there was a battle near the town of Szikszó, where the Hungarian army defeated the Turks.

== War in the Mediterranean ==
=== 1480–1563 ===
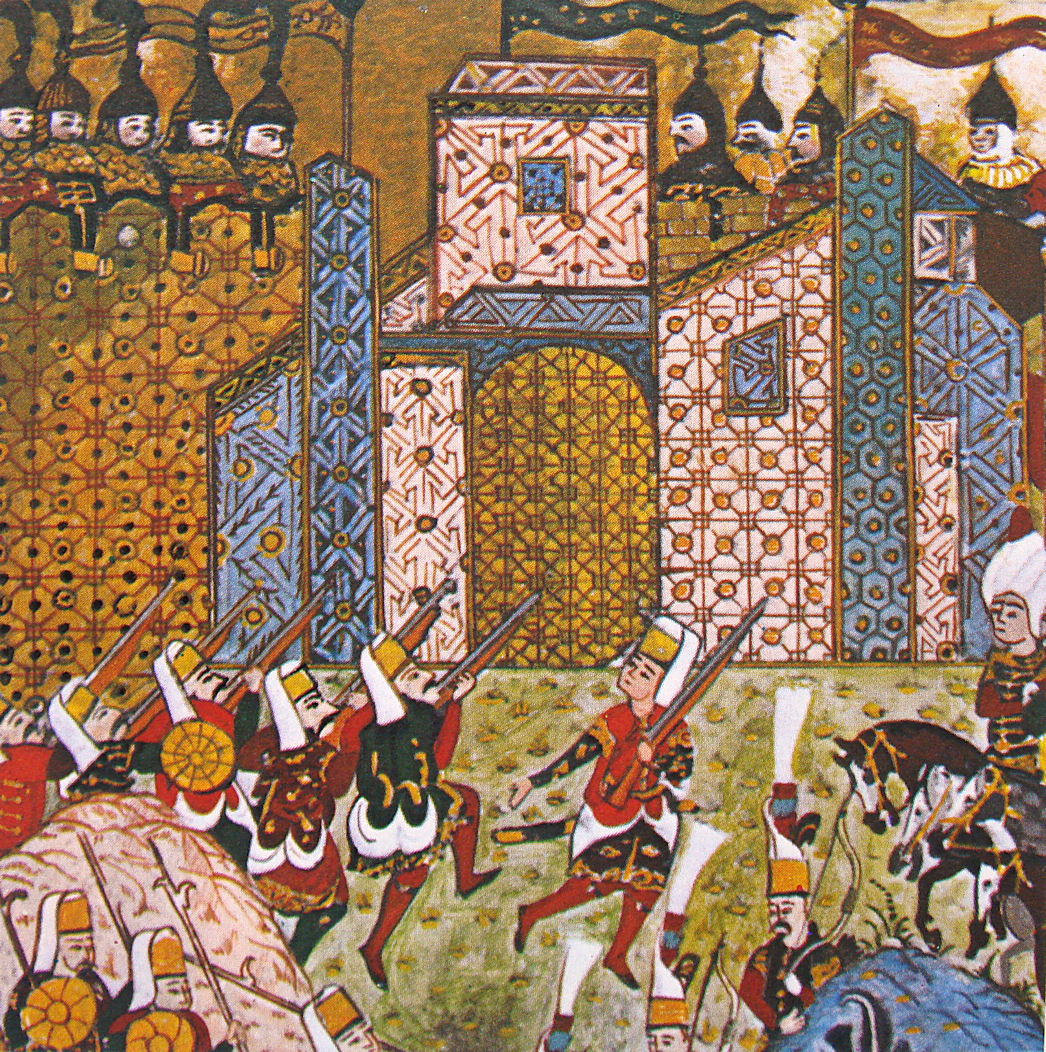
Siege of Rhodes in 1522

Meanwhile, the Ottoman Empire rapidly began displacing its Christian opponents at sea. In the 14th century, the Ottomans had only a small navy. By the 15th century, hundreds of ships were in the Ottoman arsenal taking on Constantinople and challenging the naval powers of the Italian republics of Venice and Genoa. In 1480, the Ottomans unsuccessfully laid siege to Rhodes, the stronghold of the Knights of St. John. When the Ottomans returned in 1522, they were more successful and the Christian powers lost a crucial naval base.

In 1516, Ottoman corsair Aruj Barbarossa moved his base of operations from Tunisia to Algiers. Under his brother Hayreddin Barbarossa, Algiers became the center of Ottoman authority in the Maghreb; Turkish was the official language, and Arabs and Berbers were excluded from government posts.

Between 1526 and 1533, Ottoman corsair Turgut Reis landed several times at the ports of the Kingdom of Sicily and the Kingdom of Naples, while intercepting the ships which sailed between Spain and Italy, capturing many of them.

Hayreddin Barbarossa, who set sail for the Mediterranean with the strong fleet he had prepared in the winter of 1533–1534, devastated the coasts of the Kingdom of Naples and then conquered Tunis on 16 August 1534. In retaliation, Charles V led a massive Holy League of 60,000 soldiers against the Ottoman city of Tunis. After Hayreddin Barbarossa's fleet was defeated by a Genoese one, Charles' army put 30,000 of the city's residents to the sword. Afterwards, the Spanish placed a friendlier Muslim leader in power. The campaign was not an unmitigated success; many Holy League soldiers succumbed to dysentery, only natural for such a large overseas army. Furthermore, much of Barbarossa's fleet was not present in North Africa and the Ottomans won a victory against the Holy League in 1538 at the Battle of Preveza in western Greece.

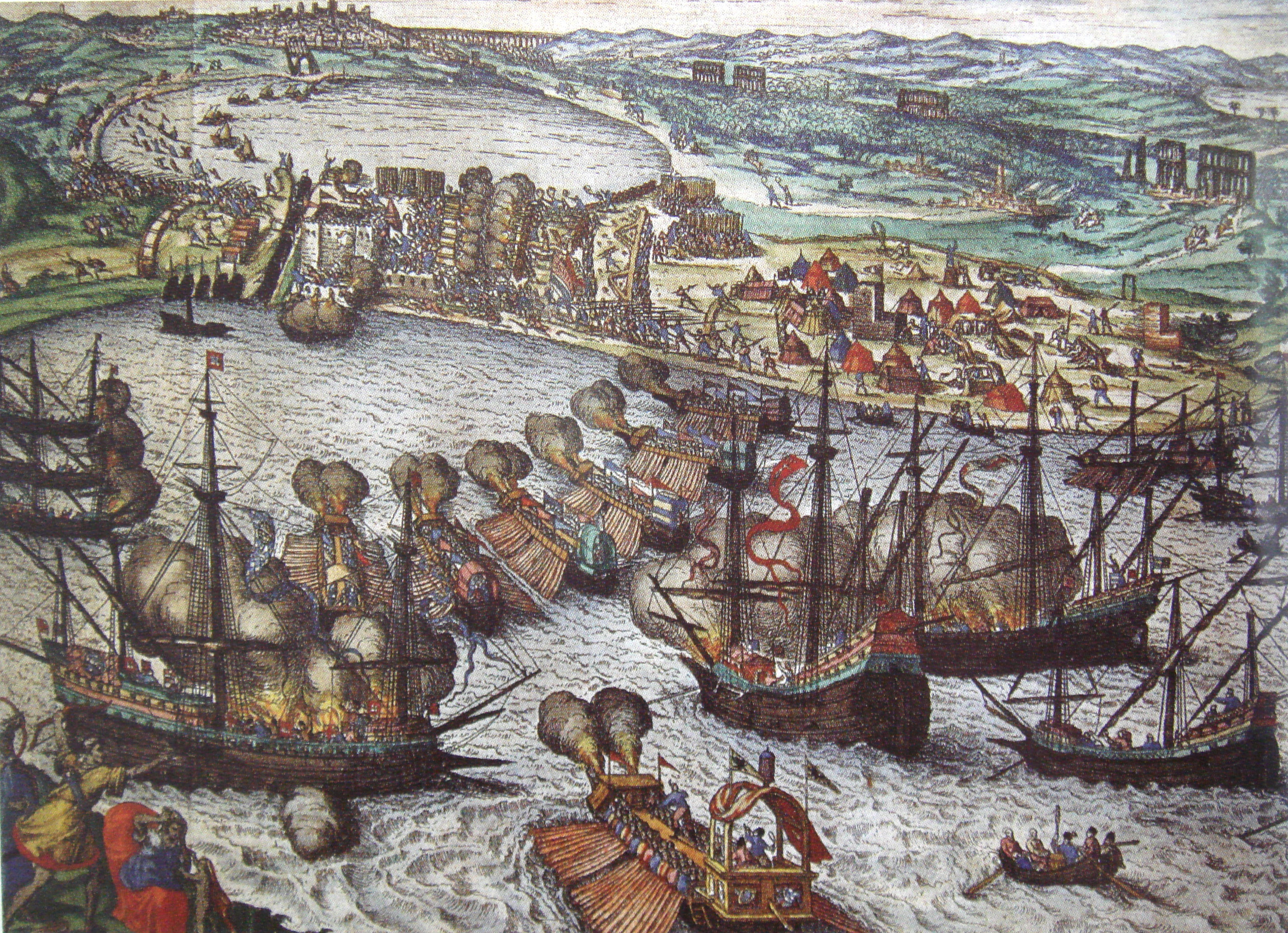
Conquest of Tunis in 1535

On the Adriatic Sea, Castelnouvo, which was captured by the Genoese Admiral Andrea Doria (at the service of Habsburg Spain) in the same year to be used as a base against the Ottomans in the future, was recaptured by Barbarossa in 1539 in a siege in which the 6,000-man Spanish garrison was annihilated.

In 1541, Charles led an amphibious attack on the Ottoman stronghold of Algiers, which was defended by Hasan Agha, an Italian renegade from Sardinia. As Charles put ashore, Andrea Doria's accompanying fleet was battered by a storm and many ships were lost. Charles's land force marched toward Algiers, but sorties by Janissaries halted the advance, and Charles withdrew.

In 1544, Algerian corsairs sailed into the Bay of Naples and raided it. They then took an estimated 7,000 Neapolitan slaves. In 1544, Hayreddin Barbarossa captured the island of Ischia, taking 4,000 prisoners, and enslaved some 2,000–7,000 inhabitants of Lipari. Among 55 Algiers corsair captains recorded in 1625–26, 51% were European converts, 38% were Turks, 9% were Moriscos, and 2% were Moors.

In 1554, Turgut Reis sailed to the Adriatic Sea and landed at Vieste in the Kingdom of Naples, capturing and sacking the city, killing 5,000 of its inhabitants and enslaving 6,000. In 1558, the Ottoman Empire launched a raid on the Balearic Islands. The Ottoman forces, led by admirals Piali Pasha and Turgut Reis, enslaved over 4,000 inhabitants and ravaged the islands. In 1558, the Ottomans attacked Reggio Calabria and took most of its inhabitants as slaves to Tripoli. In 1563, Turgut Reis landed at the shores of the province of Granada and captured coastal settlements in the area like Almuñécar, along with 4,000 prisoners. In April 1563 he supported the fleet of Salih Reis with 20 galleys during the Ottoman siege of Oran, bombarding the Fortress of Mers-el-Kebir.

=== Siege of Malta ===
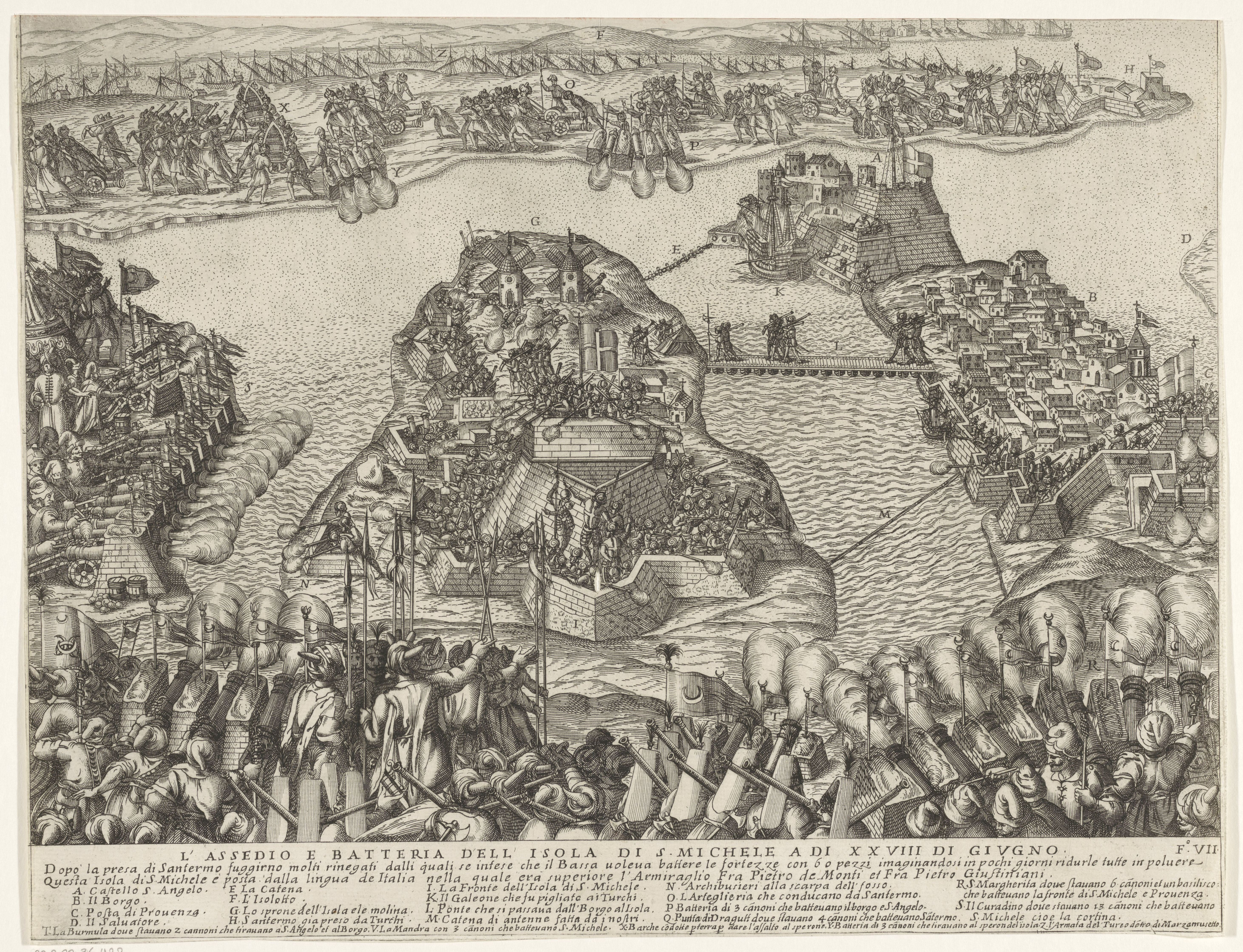
Siege of Malta in 1565. Fort St. Elmo (top right) was captured after a siege lasting 29 days.

Despite the loss of Rhodes, Cyprus (an island farther from Europe than Rhodes) remained Venetian. When the Knights of St. John moved to Malta, the Ottomans found that their victory at Rhodes only displaced the problem; Ottoman ships came under frequent attacks by the Knights, as they attempted to stop Ottoman expansion to the West. Not to be outdone, Ottoman ships struck many parts of southern Europe and around Italy, as part of their wider war, allied with France against the Habsburgs (See Italian Wars). The situation finally came to a head when Suleiman, the victor at Rhodes in 1522 and at the Battle of Djerba, decided in 1565 to destroy the Knights' base at Malta. The presence of the Ottoman fleet so close to the Papacy alarmed the Spanish, who began assembling first a small expeditionary force (that arrived in time for the siege) and then a larger fleet to relieve the island. The ultra-modern star-shaped fort of St Elmo was taken only with heavy casualties including the Ottoman general Turgut Reis, and the rest of the island was too much. Even so, Barbary piracy continued and the victory at Malta had no effect on Ottoman military strength in the Mediterranean.

=== Cyprus and Lepanto ===
Battle of Lepanto

The death of Suleiman the Magnificent in 1566 brought Selim II to power. Known by some as "Selim the Sot", he assembled a massive expedition to take Cyprus from Venice. An option that Selim opted out of was to assist the Moorish rebellion that had been instigated by the Spanish crown to root out disloyal Moors. Had Selim succeeded in landing in the Iberian peninsula, he may have been cut off, for after he had captured Cyprus in 1571 he suffered a decisive naval defeat at the Battle of Lepanto. The Holy League, assembled by the Pope to defend the Island, arrived too late to save it (despite 11 months of resistance at Famagusta); having collected so much of Europe's available military strength, the Holy League was better supplied with ammunition and armor and inflicted a blow on the Ottomans. The chance to retake Cyprus was wasted in the typical squabbling that followed the victory, so that when the Venetians signed a peace treaty with the Ottomans in 1573, they did so according to Ottoman terms.

== War in the Indian Ocean and Southeast Asia ==
By the end of Suleiman's reign, the Empire spanned approximately 877,888 mi^{2} (2,273,720 km^{2}), extending over three continents: mainly Europe, Africa and Asia. In addition, the Empire became a dominant naval force, controlling much of the Mediterranean Sea. By this time, the Ottoman Empire was a major part of the European political sphere. The Ottomans became involved in multi-continental religious wars when Spain and Portugal were united under the Iberian Union led by the Habsburg monarch Philip II of Spain, the Ottomans as holders of the Caliph title, meaning leader of all Sunni Muslims worldwide, and Iberians, as leaders of the Christian crusaders, were locked in a worldwide conflict, with zones of operations in the Mediterranean sea and Indian Ocean where Iberians circumnavigated Africa to reach India, and in the way, wage wars upon the Ottomans and its local Muslim allies and likewise the Iberians passed through newly Christianised Latin-America and sent expeditions that traversed the Pacific to Christianize the partially Muslim Philippines and use it as a base to further attack the Muslims in the far east. In which case, the Ottomans sent armies to aid its easternmost vassal and territory, the Sultanate of Aceh in Southeast Asia. During the 17th century, the bloody worldwide conflict between the Ottoman Caliphate and Iberian Union was nevertheless a stalemate, since both powers were at similar population, technology and economic levels.

=== The Luzones and the Conquest of Philippines by the Spanish Habsburgs ===
During the 1500s, The Luzones were a people coming from Luzon, Philippines that had trade and military networks across South, Southeast, and East Asia, and had found employment both for the Ottoman and Portuguese sides back when the Ottomans concentrated assistance to Southeast Asian Sultanates on their new protectorate, the Sultanate of Aceh and the Portuguese conquered Malacca. Luzon, where the Luzones were from were divided among Islamized and Pagan peoples (Buddhist, Hindu, and Animist) who fought each other. Nevertheless, Luzones found employment as officials across the region such as the following cases. Due to the invasion of Hindu Tondo by the Sultanate of Brunei which set up the Muslim Rajahnate of Maynila as a puppet-state, the prince of Manila and grandson of Sultan Bolkiah, named Rajah Ache, served as the admiral of the Bruneian navy and had suppressed a Buddhist revolt in Southwest Borneo at the city of Loue as well as served as the enforcer of Bruneian interests in Luzon. Likewise, after the Ottoman expedition to Aceh, the Ottoman commander, Heredim Mafamede sent out from Suez by his uncle, Suleiman, Viceroy of Cairo, when his fleet later took Aru on the Strait of Malacca, which contained 4,000 Muslims from Turkey, Abyssinia, Malabar, Gujarat and Luzon, and following his victory, Heredim left a hand-picked garrison there under the command of a Luzones Filipino by the name of Sapetu Diraja. Sapetu Diraja, was then assigned by the Sultan of Aceh the task of holding Aru (northeast Sumatra) in 1540. The Luzones even joined the attempt for a Muslim reconquest of Malacca against the Portuguese. Luzon mercenaries also participated in an unsuccessful attempt to retake Malacca in 1525 with the help of Portuguese renegade Martin Avelar. The "captain of the Luces" sailed in the flagship with warriors Joao de Barros considered "the most warlike and valiant of these parts." However, the Luzones also found employment in Portuguese Malacca, and one of them, Regimo Diraja was appointed as Temenggung (Jawi: تمڠݢوڠ (Governor and Chief General) over the natives and he even controlled and policed the trade between the Indian Ocean, the Strait of Malacca, the South China Sea, and the medieval maritime principalities of the Philippines. The dual allegiance to the Ottomans and Portuguese, of Filipinos (Lucoes) who had trade networks across East, Southeast and East Asia had effects on Turkish interests in the Indian Ocean because Luzon eventually gave their allegiance to Habsburg controlled Spain at a later date.

1521 saw the beginnings of the Spanish and Habsburg conquest of the Philippines (Including Luzon) by Conquistadors from either Spain or Mexico. The Ferdinand Magellan expedition passed through the Philippines and attempted to conquer the Hindu Rajahnate of Cebu but only succeeded temporarily. Afterwards, in 1543, Ruy López de Villalobos arrived at the islands of Leyte and Samar and named them Las Islas Filipinas in honor of Philip II of Spain, at the time Prince of Asturias and himself a Habsburg, as the name was eventually expanded to label the whole archipelago of The Philippines.

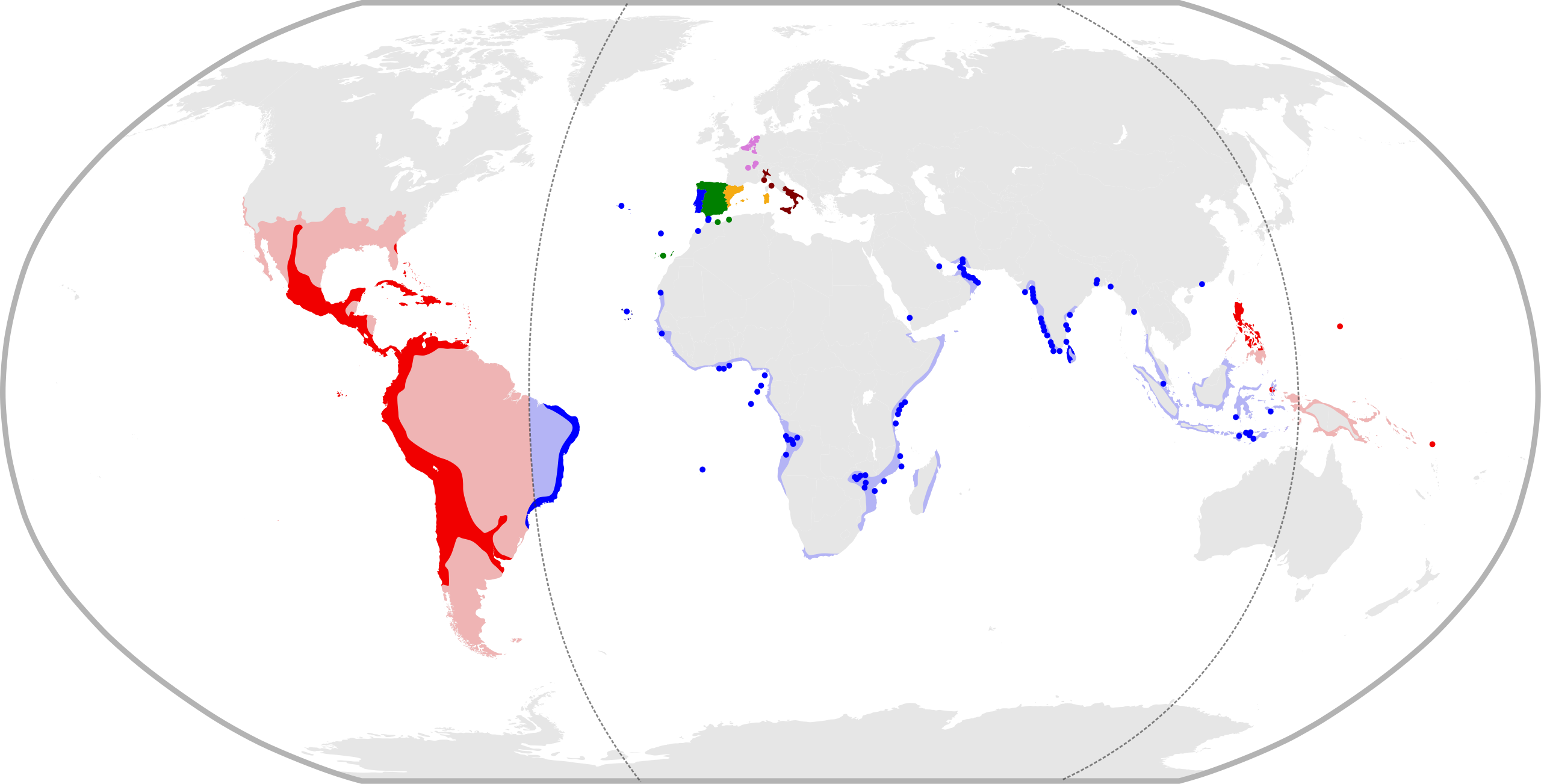
The Iberian Union in 1598, under Philip II, King of Spain and Portugal

European colonialization began in earnest when Spanish explorer Miguel López de Legazpi arrived from Mexico in 1565 and formed the first European settlements in Cebu. Beginning with just five ships and five hundred men accompanied by Augustinian monks, and further strengthened in 1567 by two hundred soldiers, he was able to repel the Portuguese and create the foundations for the colonialization of the Archipelago. In 1571, the Spanish, their Latin-American recruits and their Filipino (Visayan) allies, commanded by able conquistadors such as Mexico-born Juan de Salcedo (who was in love with Tondo's princess, Kandarapa) attacked Maynila, a vassal-state of the Brunei Sultanate and liberated plus incorporated the kingdom of Tondo as well as establishing Manila as the capital of the Spanish East Indies. The Spanish employed the divide and conquer policy of pitting the various Animist, Hindu and Muslim Filipino kingdoms against each other to rapidly conquer a divided people. After the initial conquest, control of the archipelago was cemented by a steady flow of Spanish, Mexican and Peruvian settlers and soldiers from Europe and Latin-America, as the Philippines was governed under the Mexico-based Viceroyalty of New Spain until the onset of Mexican independence.

=== Ottoman-Bruneian conflict against Spanish-Philippines ===
The fall of Bruneian Manila to Habsburg Spain had disastrous after effects to Muslim interests, especially among the Bruneians, Ottomans, and Acehnese as the formerly Muslim city-state became a center of Christian crusading against most of the Sultanates of Southeast Asia. The Bruneians raised several fleets to retake Manila but they were frustrated. However, the Spanish in Manila grew afraid of the power of Brunei and one Spaniard named Melchor Davalos warned of the constant migration of even the Turks/Ottomans to Borneo as well as other Muslims from the Middle East. Melchor Davalos was so warry he complained to the Spanish king.

Persians and Arabs and Egyptians and Turks brought [Muhammad's] veneration and evil sect here, and even Moors from Tunis and Granada came here, sometimes in the armadas of Campson [Kait Bey], former Sultan of Cairo and King of Egypt... Thus it seems to me that these Moros of the Philippine Islands [are] mainly those who, as had been said, come from Egypt and Arabia and Mecca, and are their relatives, disciples and members, and every year they say that Turks come to Sumatra and Borneo, and to Ternate, where there are now some of those defeated in the famous battle which Señor Don Juan de Austria won.

— Melchor Davalos

Increasing tension between Spain and Brunei plus its oppressed allies in the Philippines, mainly the Sultanates of Sulu, Maguindanao and Lanao, which was spurred on by the continual Ottoman and Arab migrations into Brunei some of whom were even defeated veterans of the Battle of Lepanto contrasted with the Spanish and Latin-American migrations to the Philippines, eventually erupted into the violence of the Castille War against Brunei and the Spanish-Moro Wars.

The time the Castilian War broke out was a time of religious fervor in Europe and many parts of the world, when a single state religion was followed. In Spain, the state religion was Roman Catholicism, obliging followers of other faiths such as Jews and Muslims to convert to this religion. Spain had recently finished a 700-year-old war to reconquer and re-Christianise Spain, which had been invaded by the Muslims under the Umayyad Caliphate since the 8th century AD. The long process of reconquest, sometimes through treaties, mostly through war, is known as the Reconquista. The hatred of Spaniards against the Muslims that once invaded Spain fueled the Castilian War against the similarly Muslim Bruneians. This war also started the Spanish–Moro Wars in the Philippines against the Sultanate of Sulu and Sultanate of Maguindanao.

In 1576, the Spanish Governor in Manila, Francisco de Sande, had arrived from Mexico. He sent an official mission to neighbouring Brunei to meet Sultan Saiful Rijal. He explained to the Sultan that they wanted to have good relations with Brunei and also asked for permission to spread Christianity in Brunei (Roman Catholicism in Brunei was a legacy brought by Spaniards). At the same time, he demanded an end to Brunei proselytism of Islam in the Philippines. Sultan Saiful Rijal would not agree to these terms and also expressed his opposition to the evangelisation of the Philippines, which he deemed part of Dar al-Islam. In reality, de Sande regarded Brunei as a threat to the Spanish presence in the region, claiming that "the Moros from Borneo preach the doctrine of Mohammed, converting all the Moros of the islands".

Spain declared war in 1578. In March that year, the Spanish fleet, led by de Sande himself, acting as Capitán General, started their journey towards Brunei. The expedition consisted of 200 Spaniards and 200 Mexicans, 1,500 Filipino natives, and 300 Borneans. The campaign was one of many, which also included action in Mindanao and Sulu. The racial make-up of the Christian side was likely diverse, as documents a few decades later showed that the infantry was composed of Mestizos, Mulattoes, and "Indians" (From Peru and Mexico), led by Spanish officers who had worked together with native Filipinos in military campaigns across Southeast Asia. The Muslim side though was also equally racially diverse. In addition to the native Malay warriors, the Ottomans had repeatedly sent military expeditions to nearby Aceh. The expeditions were composed mainly of Turks, Egyptians, Swahilis, Somalis, Sindhis, Gujaratis, and Malabars. These expeditionary forces had also spread to other nearby Sultanates such as Brunei and had taught local mujahideen new fighting tactics and techniques on how to forge cannons.

The fighting was fierce but Spain succeeded in invading the capital of Brunei at that time, Kota Batu, on 16 April 1578, with the help of two disgruntled Brunei noblemen, Pengiran Seri Lela and Pengiran Seri Ratna. The former had travelled to Manila to offer Brunei as a tributary of Spain for help to recover the throne usurped by his brother, Saiful Rijal. Spain agreed that if they succeeded in conquering Brunei, Pengiran Seri Lela would indeed become the Sultan, while Pengiran Seri Ratna would be the new Bendahara.

Sultan Saiful Rijal and Paduka Seri Begawan Sultan Abdul Kahar were forced to flee to Meragang, then to Jerudong, where they made plans to chase the conquering army away from Brunei. In the meantime, Spain suffered heavy losses due to a cholera or dysentery outbreak. They were so weakened by the illness. However, this war entering the national conscience as a heroic episode, with the Spaniards being driven out by Pengiran Bendahara Sakam Ibni Sultan Abdul Kahar and a thousand native warriors to restore back the Sultan's power over the Empire. The Spanish return to Manila on 26 June 1578, after just 72 days. Before doing so, they burned the mosque, a high structure with a five-tier roof. Afterwards, peaceful relations were restored between the Spaniards and Bruneians. However, a legacy of Castilian-Bruneian war is the Conspiracy of the Maharlikas when the Bruneian aristocracy of Manila attempted an uprising against Spain with Japan and Brunei as allies. The conspiracy was suppressed and the conspirators were exiled to Guerrero, Mexico which later became a center of the Mexican war of independence against Spain. The onset of the Iberian Union resulted in the takeover by the Spanish Habsburgs of the territories held by Portugal across the world, and in this period, the Habsburgs conducted the ongoing Ottoman–Portuguese confrontations in the Indian Ocean and the Mediterranean Sea.

== Thirteen Years' War 1593–1606 ==
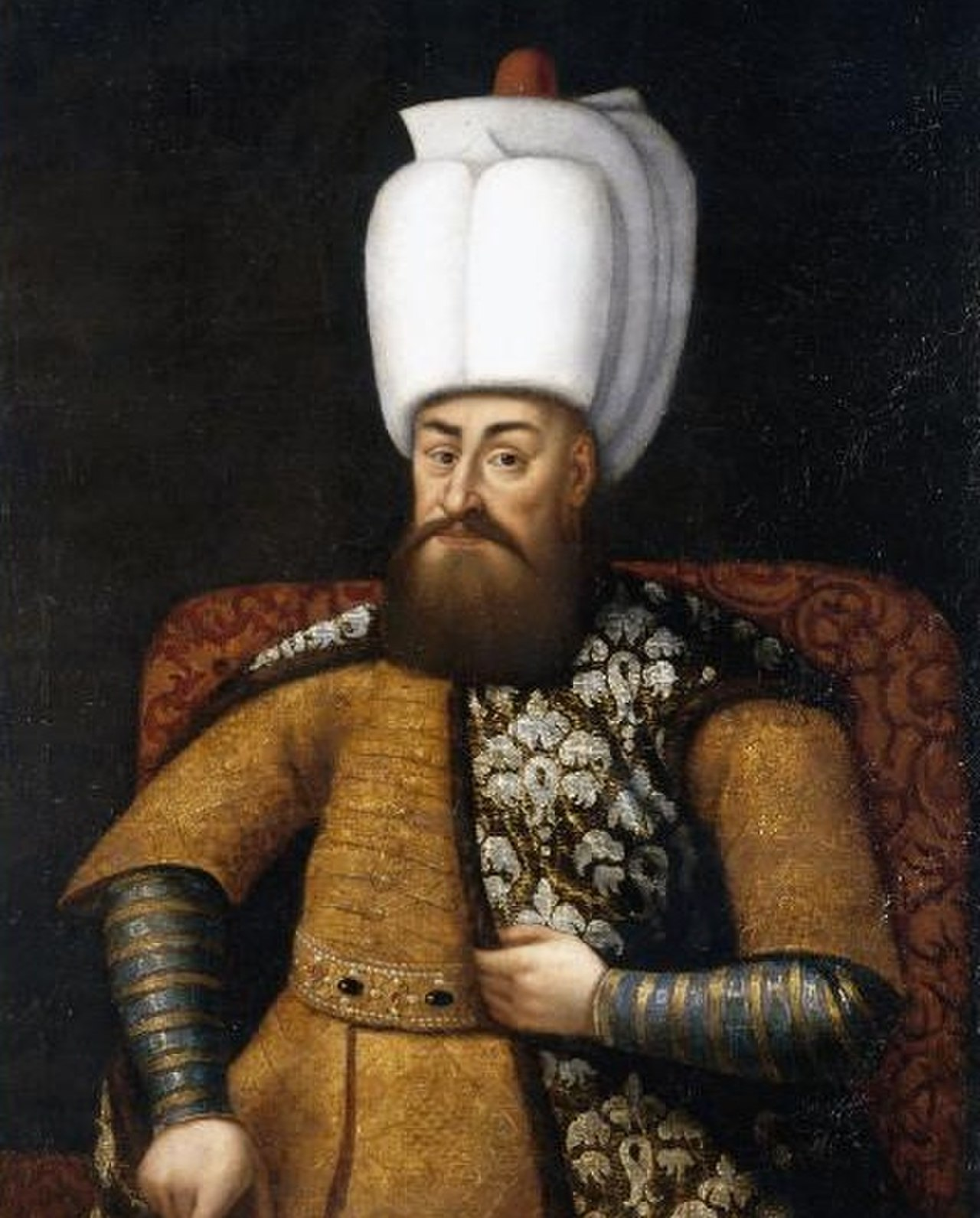
Mismanagement by Murad III may have led to early Ottoman defeats in the war

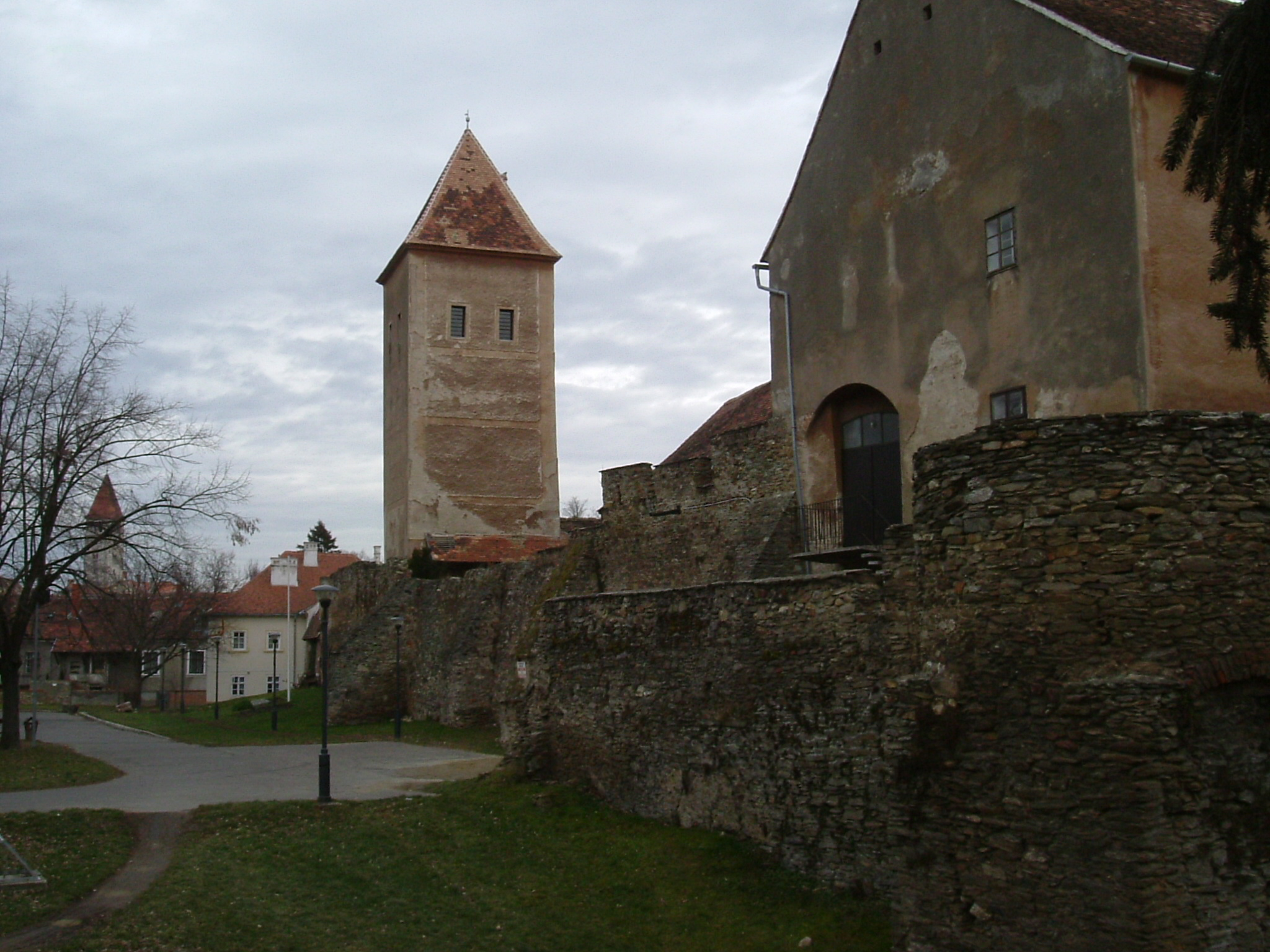
Ruins of Kőszeg castle, site of the siege of Güns in 1532

After the death of Suleiman in 1566, Selim II posed less of a threat to Europe. Though Cyprus was captured at long last, the Ottomans failed against the Habsburgs at sea (see above, Battle of Lepanto). Selim died not too long after, leaving in power his son Murad III, a hedonist who spent more time at his Harem than at the war front. Under such deteriorating circumstances, the Empire found itself at war with the Austrians yet again. In the early stages of the war, the military situation for the Ottomans worsened as the Principalities of Wallachia, Moldova and Transylvania each had new rulers who renounced their vassalship to the Ottomans. At the Battle of Sisak, a group of ghazis sent to raid the insubordinate lands in Croatia were thoroughly defeated by tough Imperial troops fresh from savage fighting in the Low Countries. In response to this defeat, the Grand Vizier launched a large army of 13,000 Janissaries plus numerous European levies against the Christians. When the Janissaries rebelled against the Vizier's demands for a winter campaign, the Ottomans had captured little other than Veszprém.

Technological disadvantages also significantly worsened the Ottoman positions in Hungary.

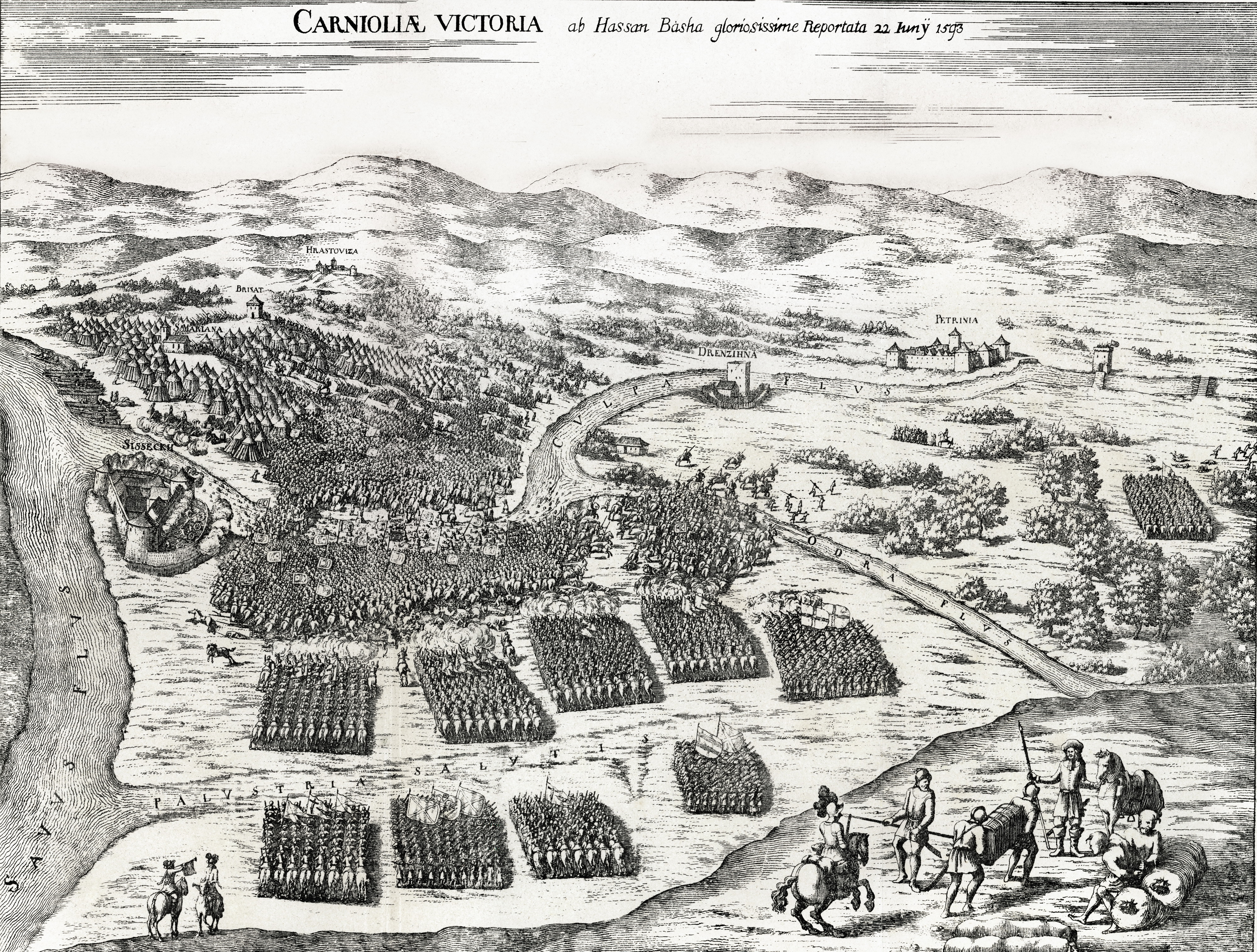
The fatal Cavalry charge by Hasan Predojević, during the Battle of Sisak in 1593.

In 1594 an even larger army was assembled by the Grand Vizier Sinan Pasha. In the face of this threat, the Austrians abandoned a siege of Gran, a fortress that had fallen during Suleiman's career, and then lost Raab. For the Austrians, their only comfort in the year came when the fortress of Komárno held out long enough against the Vizier's forces to retreat for the winter.

Despite the success of the previous year, the situation for the Ottomans worsened yet again in 1595. A Christian coalition of the former vassal states along with Austrian troops recaptured Esztergom and marched southward down the Danube. Michael the Brave, the prince of Wallachia started a campaign against the Turks (1594–1595), conquering several castles near the Lower Danube, including Giurgiu, Brăila, Hârşova, and Silistra, while his Moldavian allies defeated the Turks in Iaşi and other parts of Moldavia. Michael continued his attacks deep within the Ottoman Empire, taking the forts of Nicopolis, Ribnic, and Chilia and even reaching as far as Adrianople (Edirne), the former Ottoman capital city; no Christian army had set foot in the region since the days of the Byzantine Empire under the Palaiologoi.

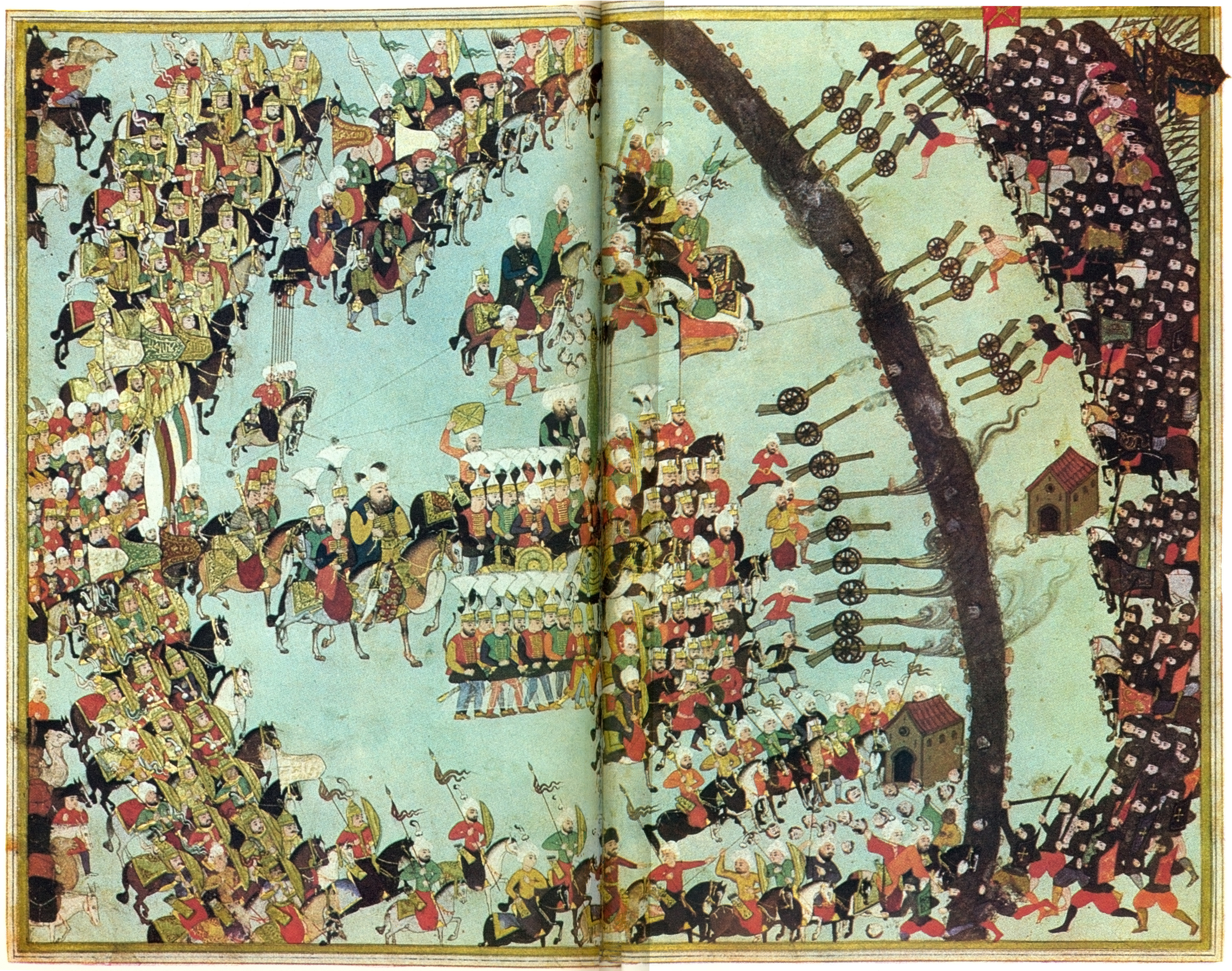
Victory of the Ottoman Army during the Battle of Keresztes.

Following the defeat of the Ottoman army in Wallachia (see the Battle of Călugăreni) and the series of unsuccessful confrontations with the Habsburgs (culminating in the devastating siege and fall of Ottoman-held Esztergom), and alarmed by the success and proximity of the threat, the new Sultan Mehmed III strangled his 19 brothers to seize power and personally marched his army to the north west of Hungary to counter his enemies' moves. In 1596 Eger fell to the Ottomans. At the decisive Battle of Keresztes, a slow Austrian response was wiped out by the Ottomans. Mehmet III's inexperience in ruling showed when he failed to reward the Janissaries for their efforts in battle; rather he punished them for not fighting well enough and thereby incited a rebellion.

The Austrians renewed the war against their enemies in the summer of 1597 with a drive southward, taking Pápa, Tata, Raab (Győr) and Veszprém. Further Habsburg victories were achieved when a Turkish relief force was defeated at Grosswardein (Nagyvárad). Enraged by these defeats, the Turks replied with a more energetic response so that by 1605, after much wasted Austrian relief efforts and failed sieges on both sides, only Raab remained in the hands of the Austrians. In that year a pro-Turkish vassal prince was elected leader of Transylvania by the Hungarian nobles and the war came to a conclusion with the Peace of Zsitva-Torok.

=== Military Innovations in the Long Ottoman-Habsburg War (1593–1606) ===
The Long Ottoman-Habsburg War (1593–1606) marked a significant period in the history of the Ottoman-Habsburg conflicts, featuring innovations in military tactics and technology. During this time, the Ottoman army, particularly its elite Janissary corps, demonstrated an increasing reliance on firearms, challenging the prevailing notion that the Ottomans were technologically inferior to their European counterparts. Scholars have debated whether the Ottoman adoption of volley fire represented an independent development or an emulation of European methods.

==== Janissary Volley Fire and Tactical Adaptations ====
Contrary to conventional views that the Ottomans lagged behind European innovations, recent studies indicate that the Janissaries employed a form of musketry volley fire during the war. Ottoman sources describe how Janissary musketeers lined up in three ranks, firing in sequence to maintain continuous fire while others reloaded. This tactic, first recorded in battle in 1605, suggests that the Ottomans had developed or adopted volley fire techniques well before many European armies fully implemented them.

The Janissaries were traditionally placed in the center of the battlefield, positioned behind chained artillery wagons (Wagenburg), and played a decisive role in engagements such as the Battle of Mezökeresztes (1596). Ottoman chronicles describe their firepower as instrumental in repelling Habsburg advances, with successive volleys preventing enemy infantry from closing in. This challenges the long-held perception that Ottoman victories in this period were primarily due to numerical superiority rather than tactical sophistication.

==== Influence of the Military Revolution Debate ====
The Ottoman use of volley fire during the Long War has been a point of contention in the broader "Military Revolution" debate. Some historians argue that the Military Revolution was a uniquely European phenomenon, characterized by the development of standing armies, extensive use of firearms, and complex battlefield formations. However, evidence suggests that the Ottomans, despite their distinct military organization, were active participants in these developments. The rapid expansion of musket-bearing soldiers within the Ottoman army and the integration of new formations, such as the sekbans (irregular riflemen), indicate a parallel evolution rather than stagnation.

Furthermore, the Hungarian theater of war during this period became a site of mutual military adaptation. The Ottomans encountered new European fortifications, such as the trace italienne, and sophisticated siege tactics. In response, they refined their artillery techniques and introduced new defensive strategies, including counter-battery fire and fortification improvements in border provinces. Additionally, the adoption of the pétard, an explosive device originally used by Habsburg forces, demonstrates Ottoman adaptability in weaponry.

==== The Aftermath and Legacy ====
The Long War ended with the Treaty of Zsitvatorok in 1606, marking a shift in Ottoman-Habsburg relations. Unlike previous treaties that reaffirmed Ottoman superiority, Zsitvatorok recognized the Habsburg emperor as an equal to the Ottoman sultan, reflecting a changing balance of power. While the war did not yield significant territorial changes, it influenced Ottoman military reforms in the early 17th century. The increased reliance on firearms and the refinement of battlefield tactics laid the groundwork for subsequent Ottoman campaigns against European adversaries.

The debate over Ottoman participation in the Military Revolution continues, but evidence from the Long War suggests that the Ottomans were not passive observers. Instead, they actively engaged in military innovation, challenging Eurocentric narratives that portray them as technologically stagnant. The integration of volley fire, strategic adaptations in siege warfare, and continued investment in firearms indicate that the Ottoman army remained a formidable force well into the early modern period.

== Conquest of Crete ==
After Ottoman victories at Rhodes (1522), Chios (1566) and Cyprus (1570); Crete (1669) was the last major island in the Eastern Mediterranean to be brought under the control of the Ottoman Empire. Before Ottoman capture, Crete was one of the largest and most prominent overseas holdings of the Republic of Venice. The island was significant to the Ottomans not only for its strategic position along shipping routes between Istanbul and Egypt, but also for its role as a safe harbor for pirates.

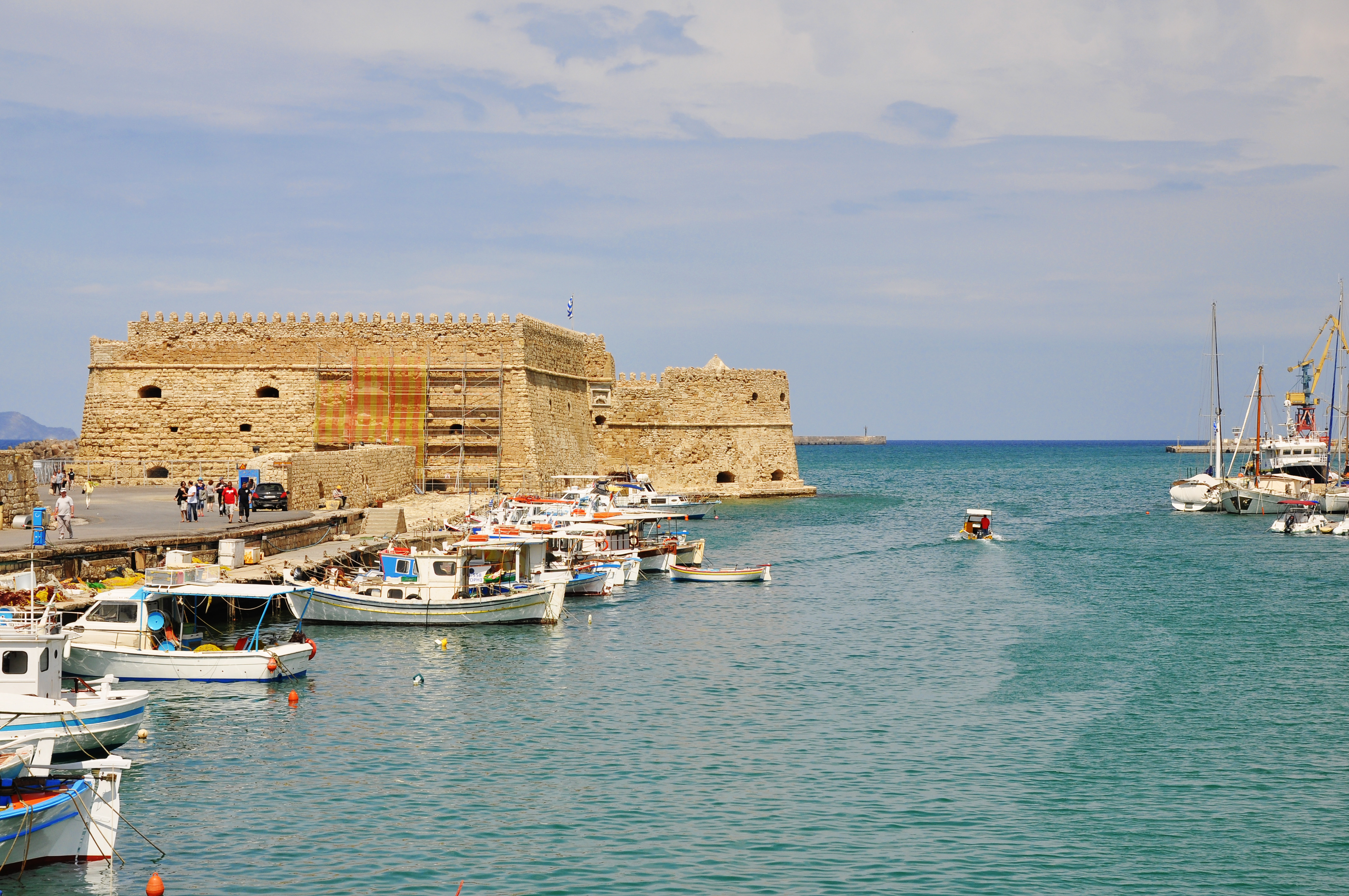
A Venetian fortress in Candia (Heraklion), Crete

In July 1644, an Ottoman ship bound for Egypt, carrying the former Chief Black Eunuch of the Harem, the kadi of Cairo, and many pilgrims heading to Mecca, was besieged and captured by the Knights of Malta. In response, the Ottomans in 1645 amassed a sizable fleet with no stated target, although many believed it would sail on Malta. Taking advantage of surprise, the Ottomans began their campaign on Crete in June 1645. Between 1645 and 1648, the Ottomans captured nearly the entire island, and in May 1648 began a siege on the capital, Candia (modern Heraklion).

Even though the Ottomans held nearly universal control over the island, the siege of Candia would go on for 21 years. The situation was complicated by naval engagements against Christian fleets in the Aegean, as well as internal political turmoil including the deposition of Sultan Ibrahim in favor of his son, Mehmed IV. During this same period, the Ottoman–Venetian war raged on several other fronts, notably a campaign in Dalmatia and several Venetian attempts to blockade the Dardanelles. In 1666, after the resolution of several other fronts, the Ottomans dispatched sizeable reinforcements towards Crete, under the personal command of Grand Vizier Köprülü Fazıl Ahmed Pasha. Over the final two years of the siege, the Venetians, bolstered by Ottoman infighting and expecting reinforcements from France, refused several offers of peace treaties. After a failed attempt by French soldiers under François de Vendôme, duc de Beaufort to break the Ottoman siege, the city surrendered on 5 September 1669. With this victory, the Ottomans secured their first major territorial gain in almost a century, and simultaneously ended 500 years of Venetian rule over Crete.

== Great Turkish War ==
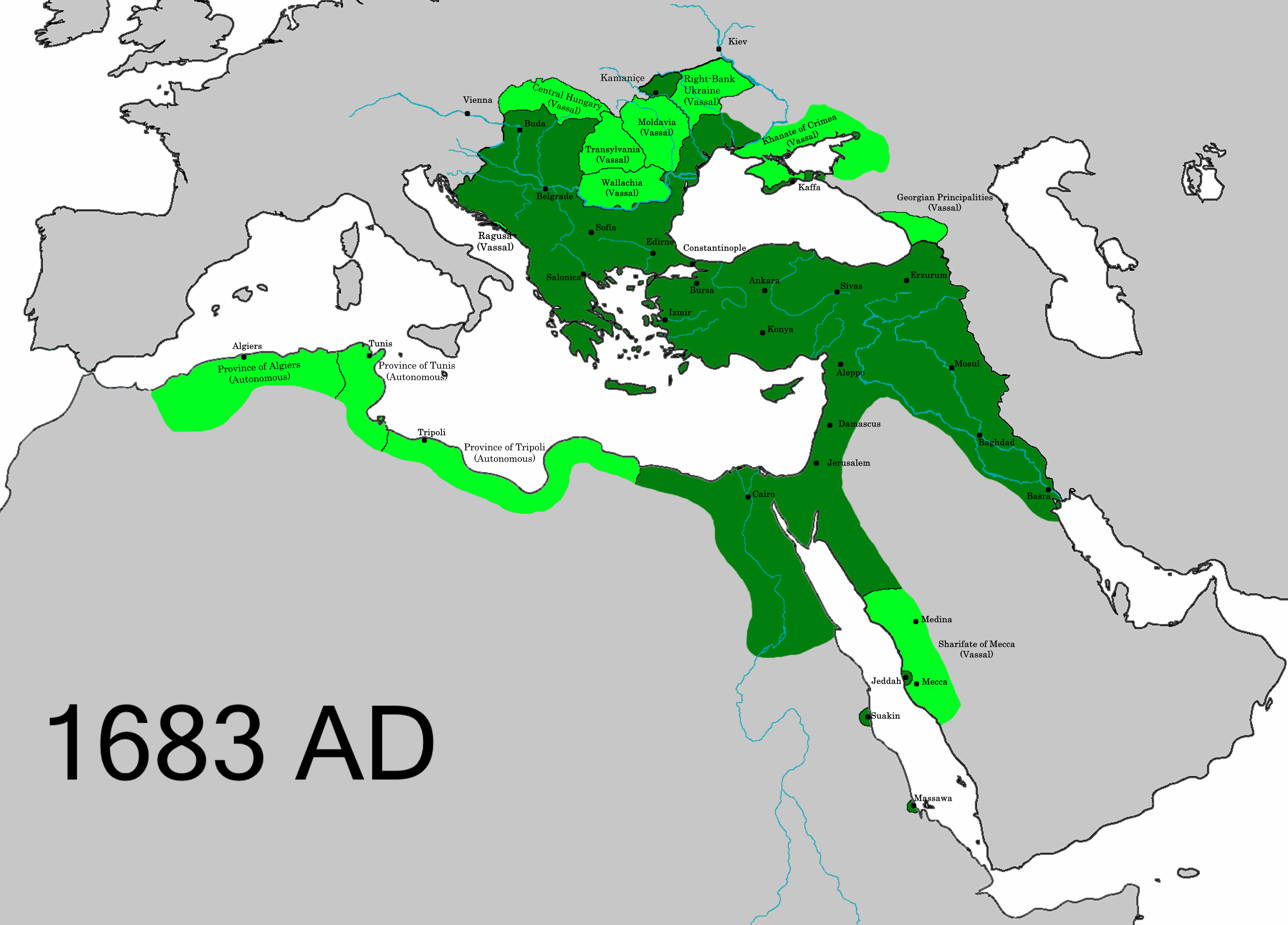
The Ottoman Empire in 1683

In August 1652, Ádám Forgách organized the defense against the marauding Ottomans, which he faced near Veľké Vozokany in Upper Hungary (present-day Slovakia). He defeated the Turkish troops in the two-day Battle of Vezekény.

In 1663, the Ottomans launched an invasion of the Habsburg Monarchy. They conquered the fortress of Nové Zámky, crossed the Váh river and invaded Moravia. The war ended at the Battle of St. Gotthard. The battle was won by the Christians, chiefly through the attack of 6,000 French troops led by François d'Aubusson de La Feuillade and Jean de Coligny-Saligny. The Austrians were unable to follow up on this victory due to the intervention of Louis XIV on the Rhine; in such circumstances the Protestant allies of the Catholic Habsburgs would have proven unreliable, wanting instead to have the Austrians and themselves fight the French in a German coalition. The Ottomans therefore turned their attention north again against the Polish–Lithuanian Commonwealth. By now, the kingdom had fallen into a terrible state; the Sejm had divided loyalties and the treasury was bankrupt. It is therefore noteworthy that John III Sobieski, king of Poland, led a decisive victory against the Ottomans at the Second Battle of Khotyn.

Restless, the Ottomans were to have another chance in 1682, when the Grand Vizier marched a massive army into Hungary and to Vienna in response to Habsburg raids into Ottoman controlled Hungary.

=== Siege of Vienna ===
In 1683, after 15 months of mobilizing forces, the Grand Vizier reached Vienna to find the city well defended and prepared. Worst for the Vizier were the numerous alliances established by the Austrians, including with Sobieski. When the siege of Vienna began in 1683, Sobieski and his coalition of Germans and Poles arrived just as Vienna's defense was becoming untenable. In one of history's truly decisive battles, and simultaneously the Ottomans' high watermark; they were defeated and the siege lifted.

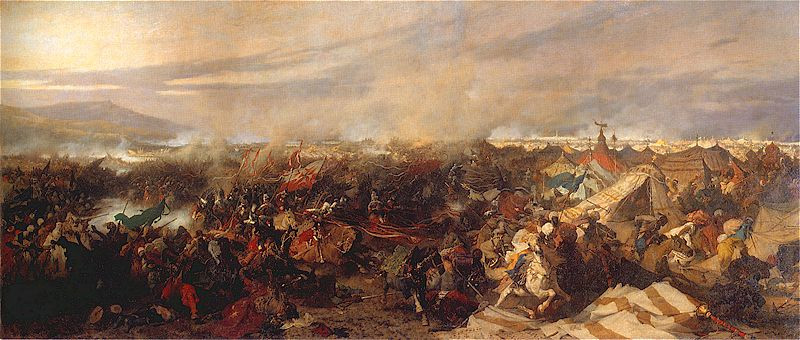
The climax of the siege of Vienna

=== Reconquest of the Ottoman occupied territories of Kingdom of Hungary ===
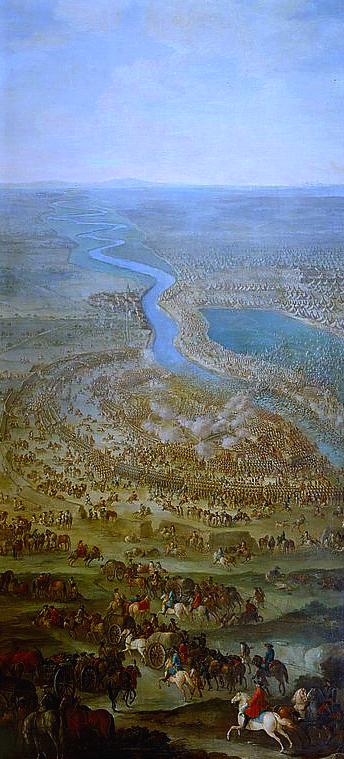
Battle of Zenta

In 1686, two years after an unsuccessful siege of Buda, a renewed European campaign was started to enter Buda, the erstwhile capital of medieval Hungary. This time, the Holy League's army was twice as large, containing over 74,000 men, including German, Croat, Dutch, Hungarian, English, Spanish, Czech, Italian, French, Burgundian, Danish and Swedish soldiers, along with other Europeans as volunteers, artillerymen, and officers, the Christian forces reconquered Buda. (See: Siege of Buda)

In 1687, the Ottomans raised new armies and marched north once more. However, Charles V, Duke of Lorraine intercepted the Turks at the Second Battle of Mohács and avenged the loss inflicted over 160 years ago by Suleiman the Magnificent. The Ottomans continued to resist the southward-pressing Austrians, denying them an opportunity to negotiate from a position of strength. Only when the Ottomans suffered yet another disastrous battle at the Battle of Zenta in 1697 did the Ottomans sue for peace; the resulting Treaty of Karlowitz in 1699 secured territories, the rest of Hungary and overlordship of Transylvania for the Austrians.

Throughout Europe Protestants and Catholics hailed Prince Eugene of Savoy as "the savior of Christendom" – English volunteers, including a son of Prince Rupert (nephew of Charles I of England) and Protestants from as far as Scotland fought in the Prince's army. For the Ottomans, the years between 1683 and 1702 were a sad time; 12 Grand Viziers were deposed in 19 years – the legacy of what was at one time under Köprülü Mehmed Pasha the most powerful position of one of the most powerful Empires in the world.

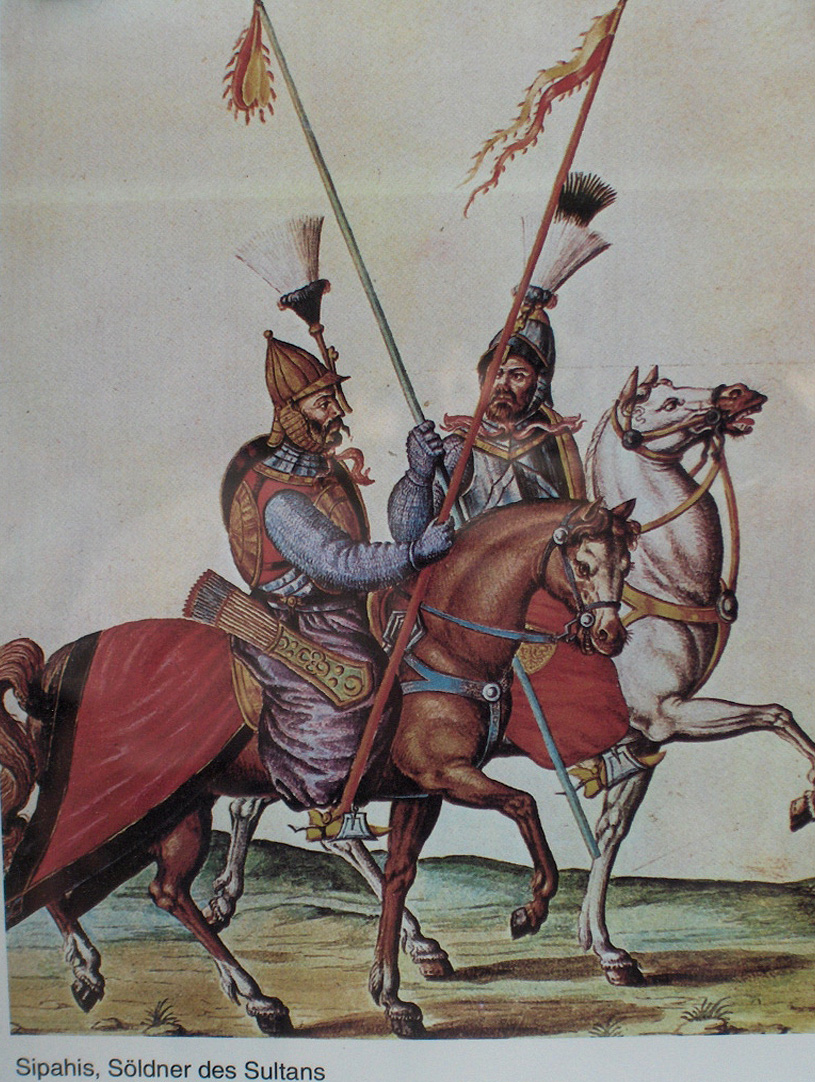
Ottoman Sipahis at the Battle of Vienna in 1683

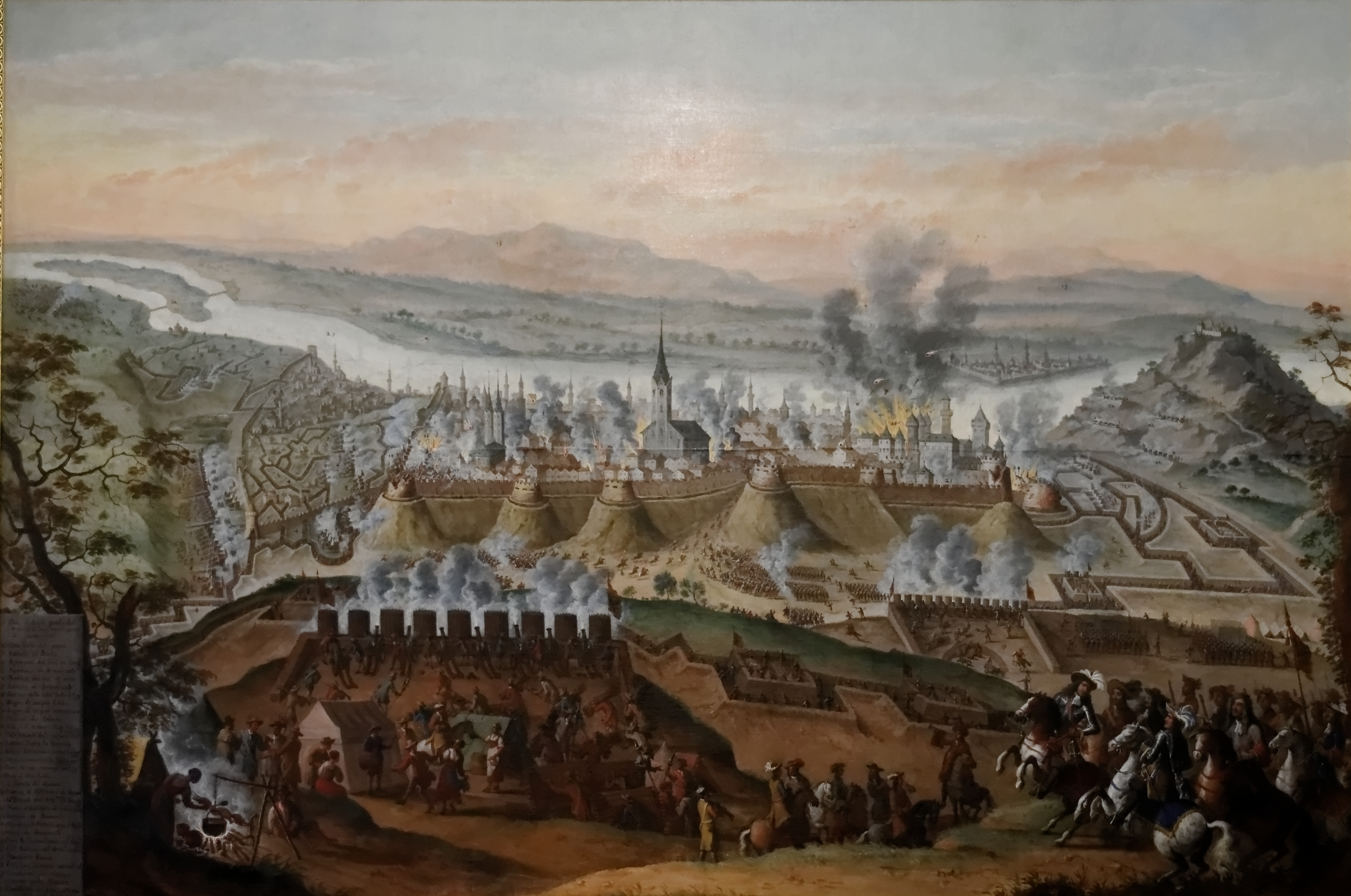
The siege of united Christian forces in Buda, 1686, by Frans Geffels

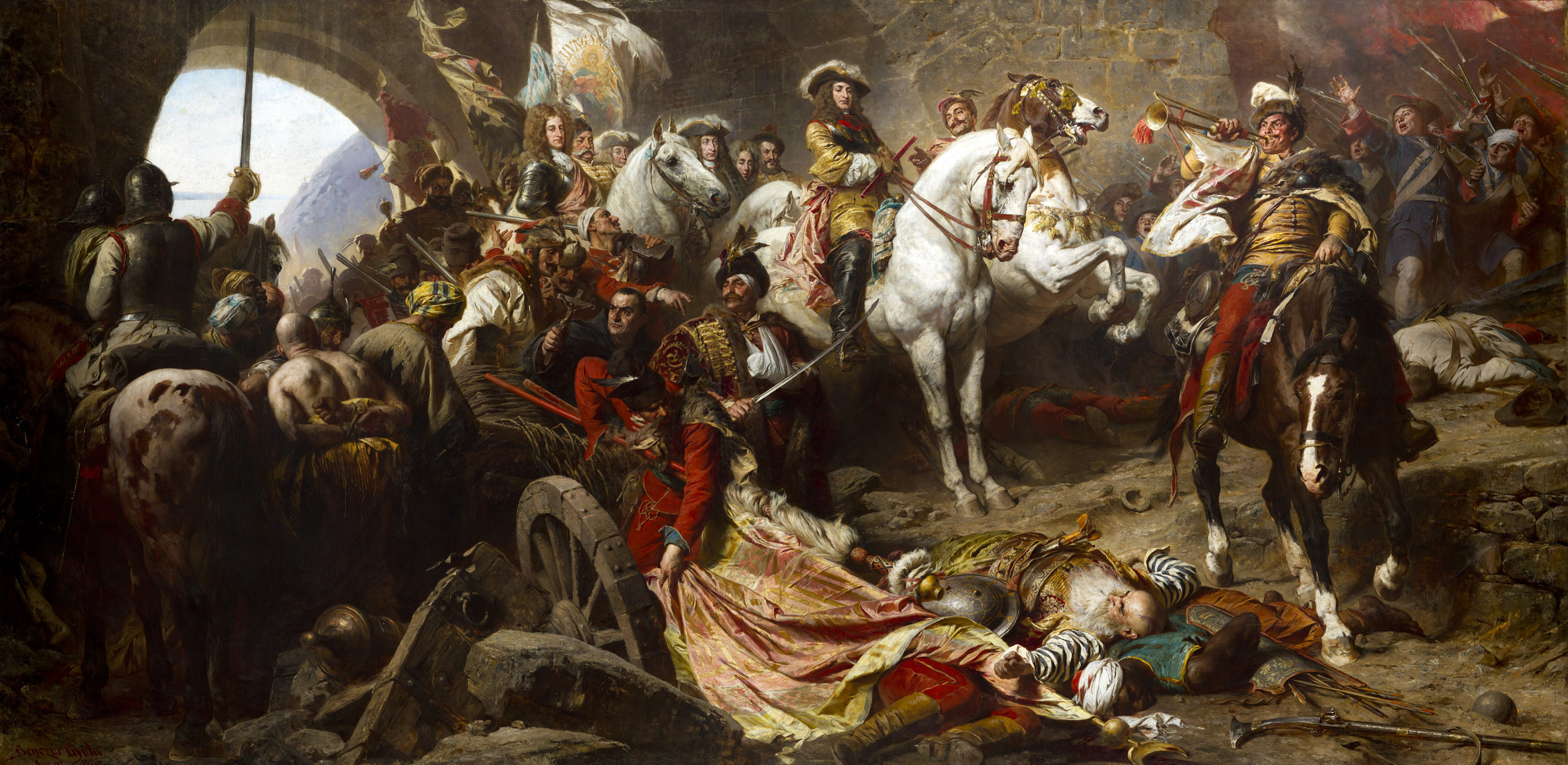
Recapturing Buda, 1686

== Endgame ==
=== 18th century wars ===
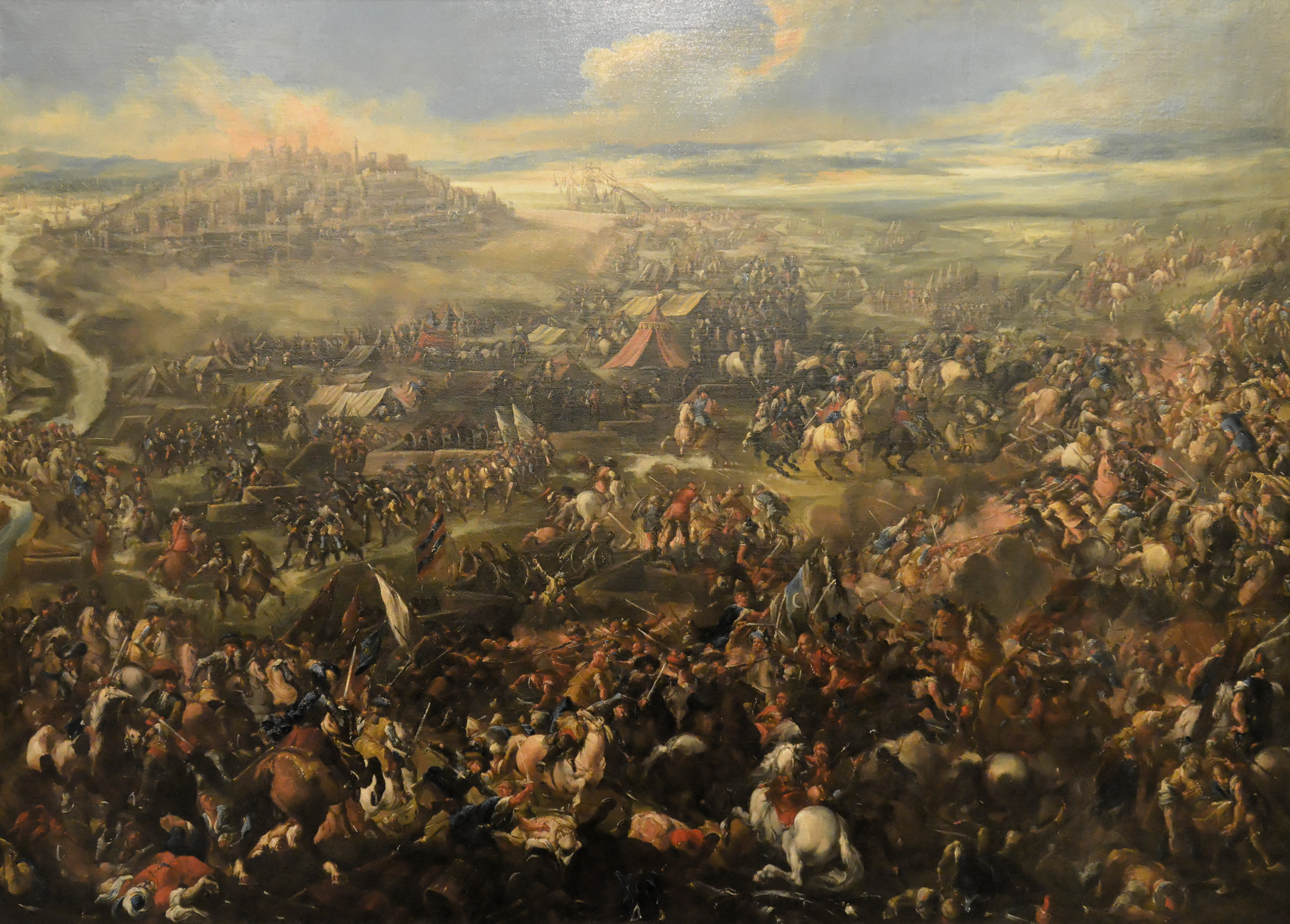
The Austro-Turkish War (1716–1718)

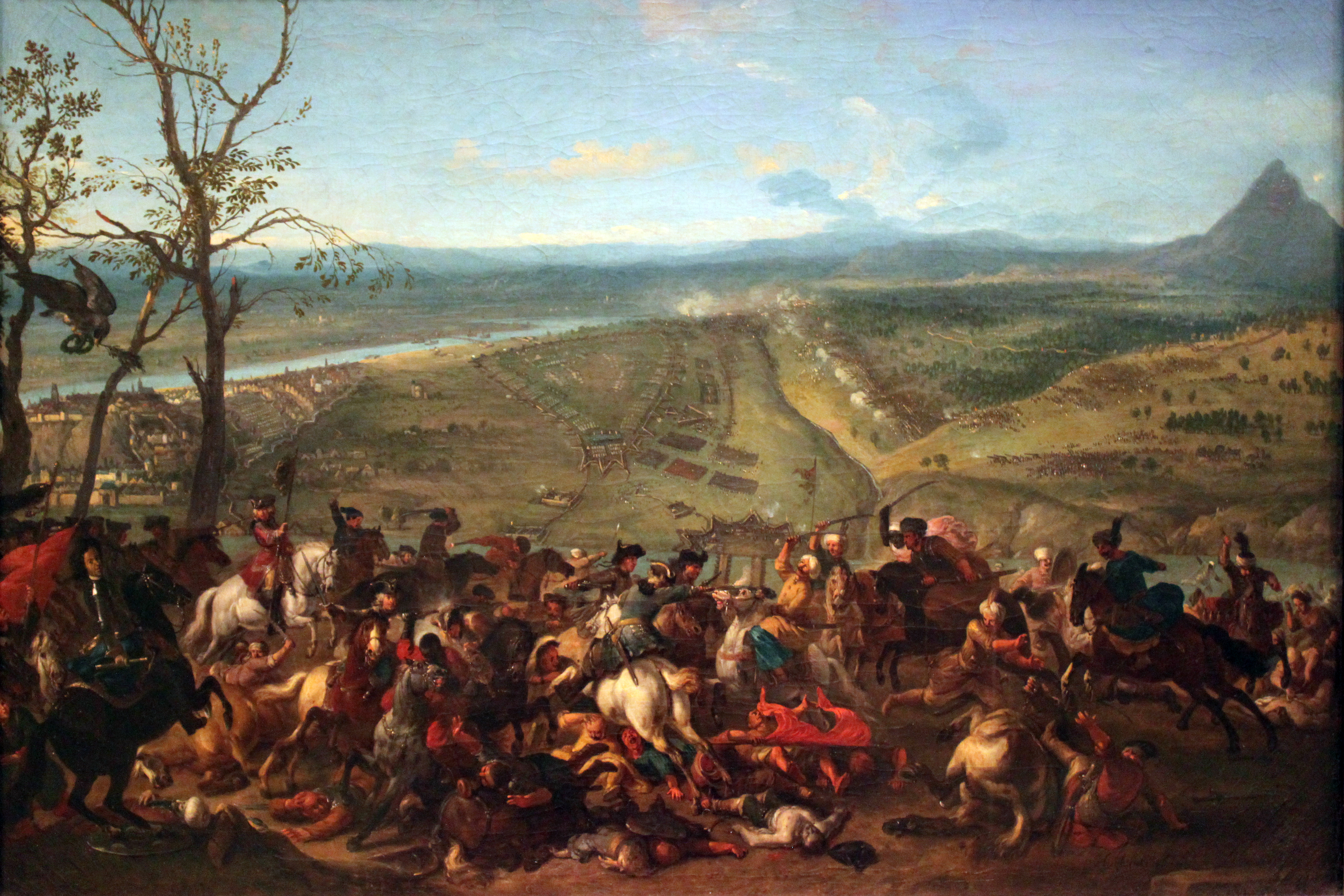
Prince Eugene of Savoy captures Belgrade, 1717

Although the Great Turkish War was a disaster for the Ottomans, the Habsburgs were soon drawn into another destructive European war (the War of the Spanish Succession) against the French, their traditional rivals.

Brimming with confidence after their victories over the Russians in 1711 (Pruth River Campaign) and over the Venetians in 1715 (Ottoman–Venetian War (1714–1718)), the Ottomans declared war on the Habsburg monarchy in 1716 and marched north from Belgrade in July under the command of Grand Vizier Ali Pasha. The invasion was a catastrophe, however, and the Ottoman army was broken and the Grand Vizier killed at the Battle of Petrovaradin in August by an outnumbered Austrian army under the command of Prince Eugene of Savoy, who went on to capture Belgrade a year later. At the subsequent Treaty of Passarowitz in 1718, the Austrians gained possession of the Banat of Temeswar, Serbia and Oltenia.

Austria joined Russia in war against the Ottomans in 1737. At the Battle of Grocka in 1739 the Austrians were defeated by the Ottomans. As a result, with the Treaty of Belgrade (1739), conquests in Serbia and Wallachia were undone. The Habsburgs ceded Serbia (including Belgrade), the southern part of the Banat of Temeswar and northern Bosnia to the Ottomans, and the Banat of Craiova (Oltenia), gained by the Treaty of Passarowitz in 1718, to Wallachia (an Ottoman subject), and set the demarcation line to the rivers Sava and Danube.

With the decline of the Ottoman Empire, Austria's foreign policy became largely disinterested in combating them and more concerned with France and Russia. During the Russo-Turkish War (1768–1774), the Russians easily defeated the Ottomans. The ease of their success alarmed the Austrians and caused them to financially subsidize the Ottomans as a counterweight. The Austrians also placed a large army on the border with Russia. The Russians, fearing an Austrian intervention, agreed to return much of the territory they captured back to the Ottomans and end the war on lesser terms than they might otherwise have obtained. Despite not participating in the war, the Austrians gained the Ottoman region of Bukovina from the treaty that ended it.

The Austro-Turkish War (1788–91) was an inconclusive struggle and Austrian territorial gains were meager in the Treaty of Sistova. The Austrians had occupied large territories including Bosnia, Belgrade and Bucharest but found themselves threatened by the imminent French Revolutionary Wars and diplomatic tensions with Prussia who threatened intervention. The gains from the enterprise came in the form of the town of Orșova in Wallachia and two small towns on the Croatian frontier. This conflict was the last time the two powers came into direct conflict, although political and military tensions remained.

=== 19th century ===
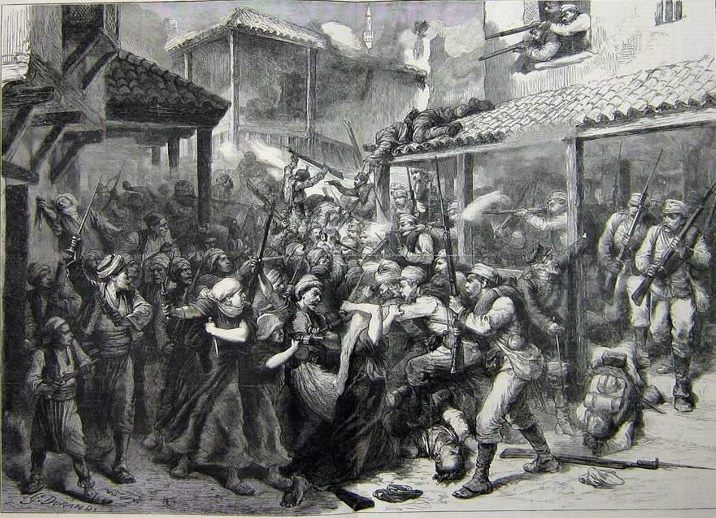
Muslim Bosniak resistance during the battle of Sarajevo in 1878 against the Austro-Hungarian occupation.

For the next 100 years, the Austrians and the Ottomans both began to slowly lose their power to the French, British, Prussians and Russians. Both the Ottomans and the Austrians lacked the heavy industry of their other European counterparts, but the Ottomans were further behind than the Austrians. Thus, Ottoman power decayed faster than Austrian power. In the Balkans, the increasingly prevalent nationalistic cries for independence became a bigger problem for the more militarily incompetent Ottomans. After 1867, the Austrians compromised with the Hungarians to form Austria-Hungary, thus preventing a major ethnic group from rebelling in the shorter term. The same benefits could not be had with the Ottomans.

Efforts to catch up with European technology led officers and intellectuals to study abroad—a plan that backfired for the Ottomans when these individuals brought back European ideas of Enlightenment and egalitarianism. These ideas subsequently clashed with the traditional Turkish-dominated, autocratic, millet system of the Ottomans. Therefore, Ottoman power collapsed more rapidly than Austrian power, and they were powerless to stop Bosnia from being occupied in 1878 (officially annexed in 1908).

Austria and the other great powers (Britain, Prussia, Russia) saved the Ottoman dynasty from early collapse against the rebellious Egypt in the Oriental Crisis of 1840. British, Austrian and Ottoman ships attacked ports in Syria and Alexandria, and the allies took Acre, causing Egypt to give up its attempt to replace Ottoman control across the Middle East.

=== World War I ===
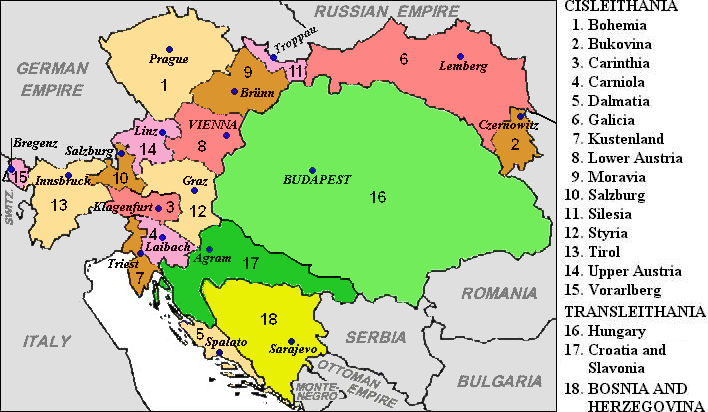
By the end of the war, the Habsburgs had shifted the balance of power away from the Ottomans

Relations between Austria and the Ottomans began to improve when they saw a common threat in Russia and a common ally in Germany in countering the threat of the Tsar. The Ottomans had hoped the Germans would industrialize their nation to defend itself against the Russians, who had taken the "anti-Turk crusade" to a more committed level, driving the Turks out of the Crimea and Caucasus. Meanwhile, the German Empire appealed to the Austrians through a common culture, language and the lenient terms imposed after the Austro-Prussian War. The Austrians were in no hurry to see Russia advance at the cost of the Ottomans towards their borders. Thus, in the years before World War I, the two former enemies found themselves allies against the French, the Russians and the British. In 1918, the Austro-Hungarian Empire surrendered to partition under the Treaties of Saint Germain and Trianon, as did the Ottomans under the Treaty of Sèvres.

== See also ==
- Description of the armed forces of the opposing sides:
  - Army of the Holy Roman Empire
  - Imperial Army of the Holy Roman Emperor
  - Military of the Ottoman Empire
- Ottoman wars in Europe
- Ottoman Navy
- List of Ottoman conquests, sieges and landings
- Ottoman decline thesis
- Croatian–Ottoman wars
- European enclaves in North Africa before 1830
- Crimean–Nogai slave raids in Eastern Europe
- Barbary slave trade
