= Apulia expedition (1537) =

- Part of the Ottoman–Habsburg wars
Date	July – August 1537
Location	Apulia
Result	Ottoman victory

Belligerents
Ottoman Empire	Spanish Empire: Kingdom of Naples

Commanders and leaders
Lütfi Pasha; Hayreddin Barbarossa	Unknown

Strength
8,000–10,000 cavalry	Unknown

Casualties and losses
Unknown	10,000 enslaved

The Apulia expedition was launched by the Ottomans against the Kingdom of Naples, which was under the crown of Spain. The Ottomans, led by Barbarossa, ravaged the coast of Apulia, taking many captives and returning.

== History ==
In January 1536, the French envoy had concluded with the Ottoman Grand Vizier, Pargalı Ibrahim Pasha, an alliance with two states. Thus creating Franco-Ottoman alliance. The two countries made plans for a joint attack on Apulia, where in 1537 the Ottomans would attack and conquer Naples, while the French king, Francis I, would attack Lombardy with a force of 50,000 men. However, the French king plans diverted towards the Netherlands.

The Ottomans pursued the attack with 100 ships led by the Ottoman generals Lütfi Pasha and Hayreddin Barbarossa. The Ottoman Sultan, Suleiman the Magnificent, had ambition to renew the conquests made by Mehmed II in Italy. The Admiral, Andrea Doria, had weak force to resist the Ottomans and retreated to Messina. The Ottomans landed near the city of Otranto in July 1537. The Ottomans landed with a force of 8,000–10,000 cavalry and a siege artillery. The Ottomans ravaged the countryside. They also captured the Kastro Castle, Ugento, and other settlements.

For a month the Ottomans ravaged Apulia, and on their departure they carried 10,000 slaves from the raid. The invasion caused widespread alarm in Italy. The Papacy fortified Rome and sent troops to check the Ottoman advance, but before any of that happened, the Ottomans were recalled to Corfu.

== Sources ==
- Joseph von Hammer-Purgstall (1835), Histoire de l'Empire ottoman Vol V.
- Thomas Henry Dyer (1861), The History of Modern Europe, from the Fall of Constantinople in 1453 to the War in the Crimea in 1857.
- Ludwig Freiherr von Pastor (1914), The History of the Popes, from the Close of the Middle Ages.
