= Kőszeg (disambiguation) =

Kőszeg is a town in Vas county, Hungary.

Kőszeg may also refer to:

- Kőszeg Mountains
- Kőszegi, a Hungarian surname

== See also ==
- Sacred Heart Church (Kőszeg, Hungary)
- Siege of Kőszeg
