= Jurišić =

Jurišić, Jurisic (Serbian Cyrillic: Јуришић) is a Croatian and Serbian surname. It is derived from the personal name Juraj (George). It may refer to:

- Tomislav Jurisic, karate, box and MMA fighter
- Helen Jurisic, mixed martial artist, World kick boxing Champion
- Nikola Jurišić (c. 1490–1545), nobleman and hero
- Iva Jurišić, women volleyballer
- Zvonko Jurišić, Bosnian Croat politician
- Ilija Jurišić, Bosnian Croat war criminal
- Planinka Jurišić-Atić, Bosnian pianist, piano pedagogue
- Mijo Jurišić, Croatian actor
- Blaž Jurišić, Croatian grammar writer
- Mario Jurišić, Croatian parody rock musician (Vatrogasci)
- Goran Jurišić, Bosnian footballer (Sarajevo)
- Goran Jurišić, footballer (Šibenik, Dinamo, Hajduk)
- Goran Jurišić (historian), historian
- Melita Jurisic, Australian actress
- Ivo Jurišić, Croatian sports journalist, long-time editor of sports section in Slobodna Dalmacija
- Al Jurisich, American footballer of Croatian descent
- Nada Jurišić, Serbian actress, Winners of The Ring with figure of Joakim Vujić, Knjaževsko-srpski teatar
- Slobodan Jurišić, Serbian drummer of YU grupa, a former Mama Co Co and Točak Band member, drums
- Pavle Jurišić Šturm (1848–1922), Serbian general of Sorbian descent
- Ivan Jurišić, Serbian footballer (Red Star)
- Svetozar Jurišić, Serbian footballer (Partizan)
- Milan Jurišić (1974–2009), Serbian criminal, member of Zemun Clan.

== See also ==
- Juriša
- Đurišić
