= Jurisics Castle =

Castle in Kőszeg, Hungary

- Kőszeg, Hungary
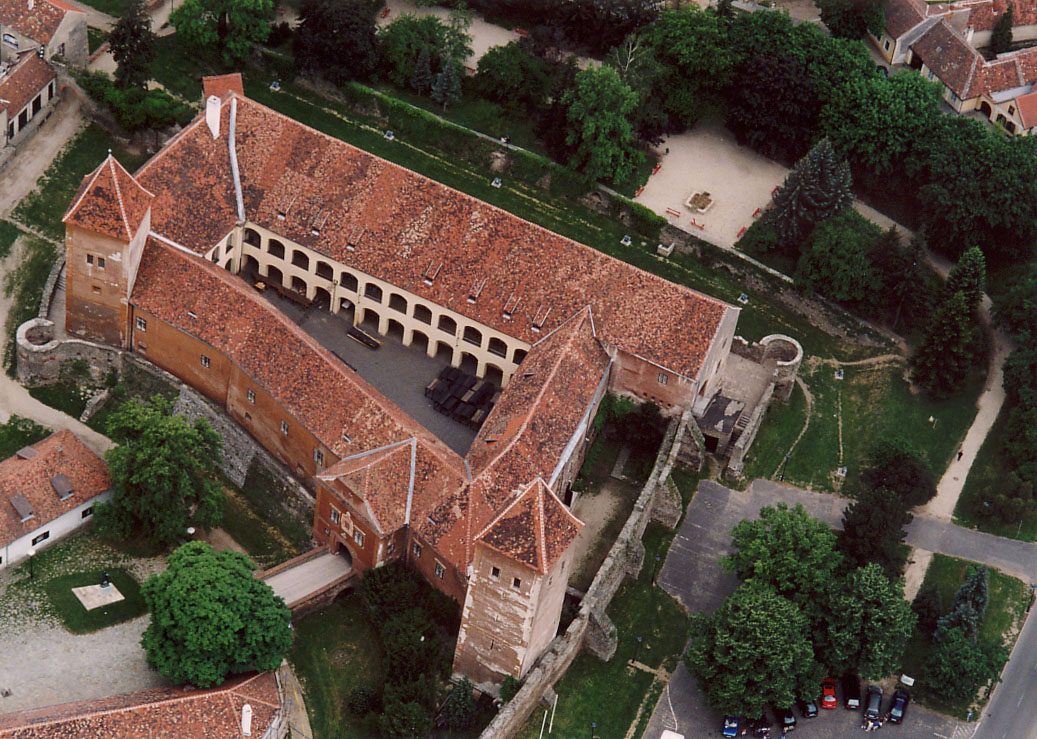
- Aerial view of Jurisics Castle

Site information
- Owner: National Treasury
- Condition: Currently operated as a museum

Location
- Coordinates: 47.38958°N 16.53887°E

Site history
- Battles/wars: Siege of Güns

Garrison information
- Past commanders: Nikola Jurišić

Jurisics Castle, named after Croatian nobleman Nikola Jurišić (Hungarian: Miklós Jurisics) is located in Kőszeg, Hungary.

== Siege of Güns ==
During the Habsburg-Ottoman wars, Pargalı İbrahim Pasha under the command of Suleiman the Magnificent laid siege to the castle in 1532. Jurišić and less than 1,000 men defended the castle for 25 days without any artillery, despite 19 assaults.

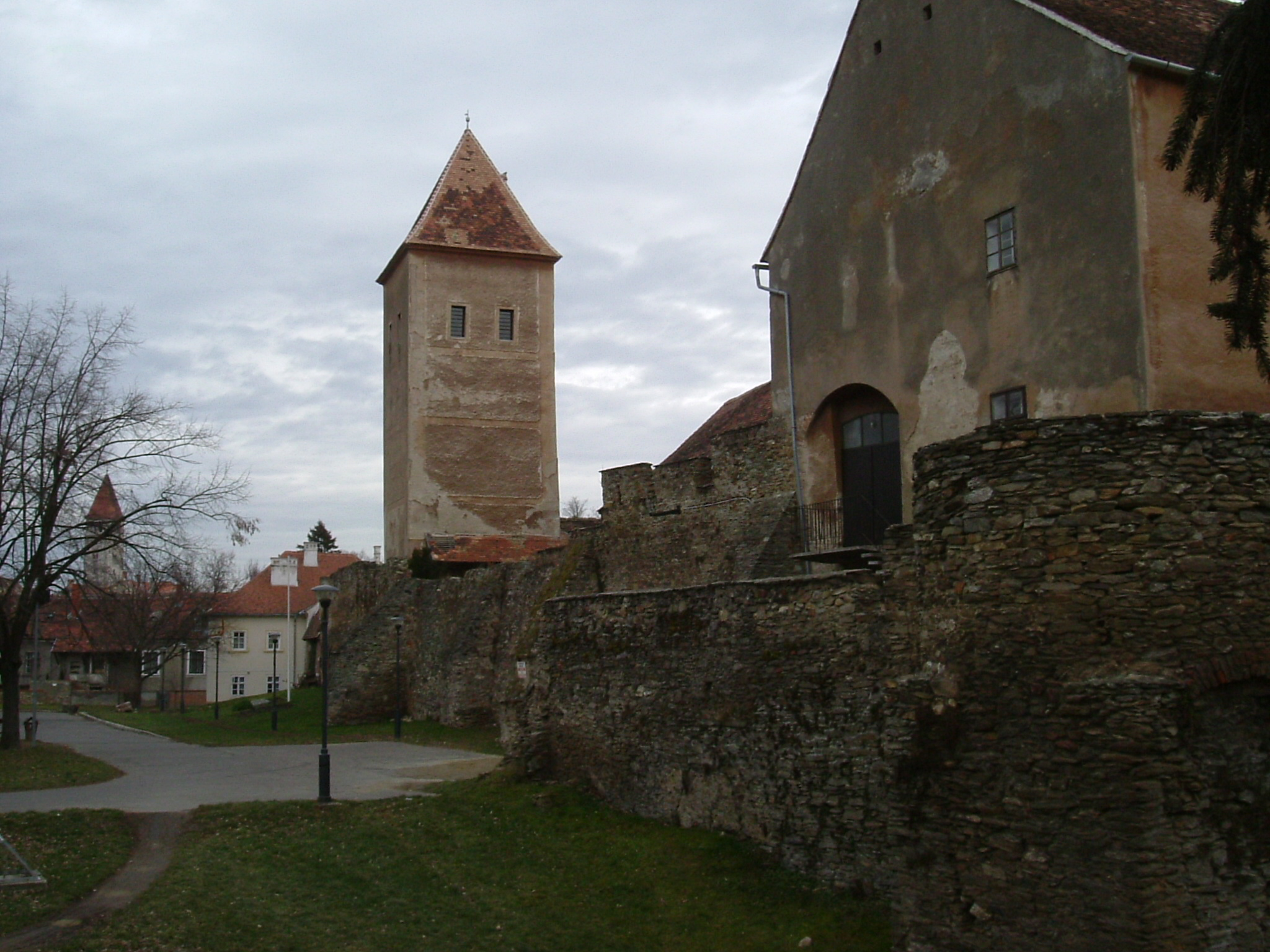
Kőszeg castle
