= Kőszegi =

Kőszegi is a Hungarian surname. Notable people with the surname include:

- Diána Kőszegi (born 1983), Hungarian Go player
- György Kőszegi (1950–2001), Hungarian weightlifter
- Rodica Dunca or Rodica Dunca Kőszegi (born 1965), Romanian artistic gymnast
- Zoltán Kőszegi (born 1964), Hungarian politician
- Kőszegi family, a medieval Hungarian noble house from the kindred of Héder
