= József Fabchich =

- Born: March 13, 1753; Kőszeg (Hungary)
- Died: December 23, 1809 (aged 56); Győrött (Hungary)
- Occupations: Writer, Cat.Priest

József Fabchich (March 13, 1753 – December 23, 1809) was a Hungarian writer, sacrificial priest and translator, known mainly for his translations of Ancient Greek poetry (namely Sappho, Alcman, Alcaeus, Anacreon, Stesichorus, Pindar and others) into the Hungarian language.

Fabchich was born in Kőszeg. Most of his translations were published in Győr in 1804. He also compiled the first Hungarian etymological dictionary in 1789–1794. He died in Győr, aged 56.
