= Nikola Jurišić =

Croatian nobleman (c.1490–1543)

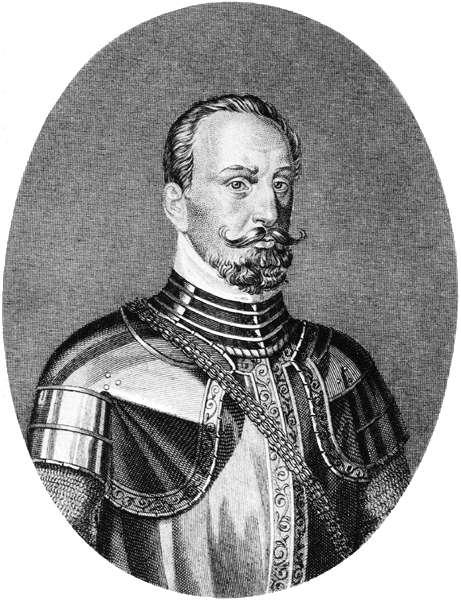
- Born: c. 1490; Senj, Croatia
- Died: 1543 (aged c. 53); Kőszeg
- Spouse: Katrina Jurisic
- Military career
- Rank: General
- Battles: The Battle of Vienna

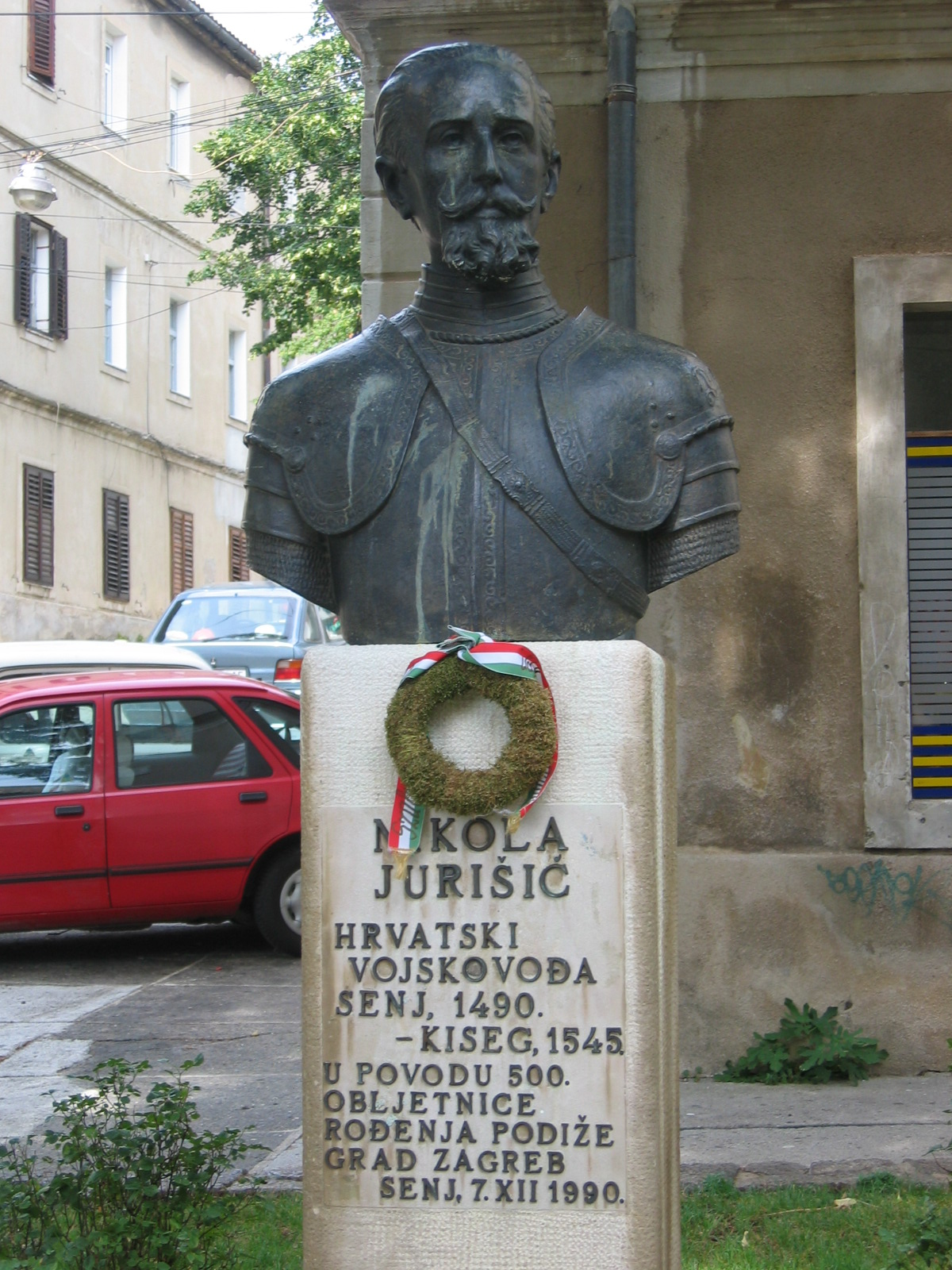
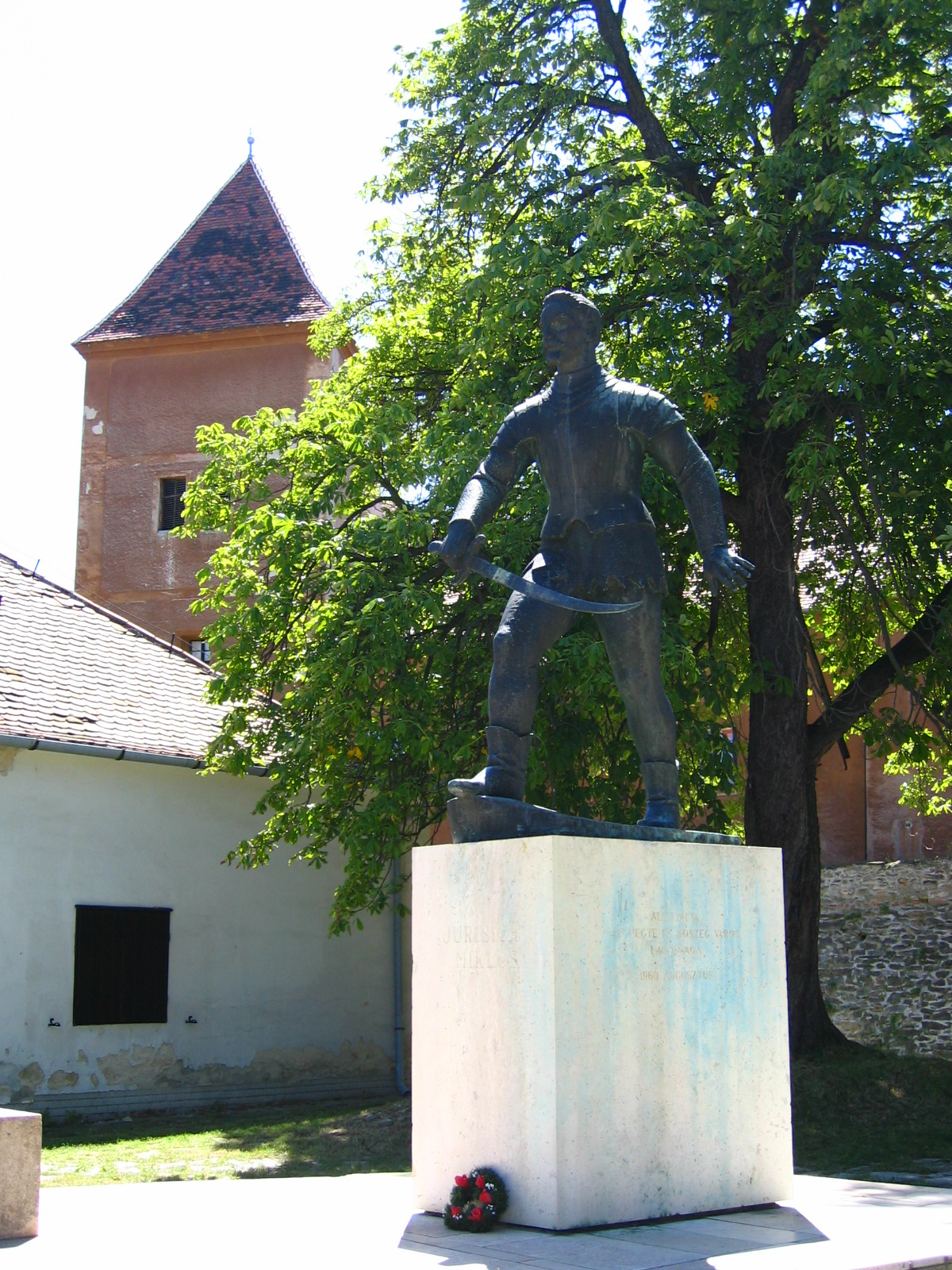
Statue of Nikola Jurišić in Senj, Croatia (left) and in Kőszeg, Hungary (right).

Baron Nikola Jurišić (Hungarian: Jurisics Miklós; c. 1490 – 1543) was a Croatian-Hungarian nobleman, soldier, and diplomat. He is known for commanding a force with fewer than 50 soldiers and only 700 villagers during the Siege of Kőszeg against a much larger Ottoman army of 120,000–140,000, stopping its advance.

== Early life ==
Jurišić was born in Senj, Croatia. His exact birth date is unknown, but the year is considered to be around 1490. His family origin is also uncertain, considered to be from Senj, Lika, or Zadar, and presumably belonged to nobility (due to coat of arms with a crow and scorpion). He knew how to speak German, but read and wrote only in Croatian Cyrillic, once signing himself as "Mikula Jurišić", and others called him by the nickname "Nicolitsch" or "Nicolizza".

He is first mentioned only in 1521 as an officer of Ferdinand I of Habsburg's troops deployed in Croatian forts in defense against the invasion of the Ottoman Empire under Suleiman I, advancing towards Vienna. In the 1521 letter is stated that he joined the Carniolian frontier army with his eight cavalrymen somewhere in 1519. He was an unknown figure until then, but when he joined the headquarters of Nicholas, Count of Salm in 1522 as military adviser for the frontier, he achieved a sudden rise in notoriety. He became the captain of defense of Senj, Klis, Knin, Skradin, Lika, and other places.

After only four years in the service, when Nicholas of Salm decided to retire in 1526, Jurišić was proposed as his successor on the Carniolian frontier, which Ferdinand I accepted. He was aware of the Ottoman advance in Hungary, and in mid-July wrote that the Croatian soldiers under Ferdinand's command should go help their Hungarian king, and would voluntarily lead 500 cavalrymen, but the Ottomans advanced fast and Hungarians were impatient to wait for reinforcements.

After the devastating Battle of Mohács on 29 August 1526, Ferdinand I made him the supreme army commander of the armed forces defending the borders (supremus capitaneus, Veldhauptmann unseres Kriegsfolks wider Turken). Jurišić, in turn, helped Ferdinand of Habsburg become the king of Croatia by brokering the 1527 election in Cetin. In the same year conquered Bihać and Ripač.

Between 1529 and 1531, Jurišić was sent twice to Constantinople to negotiate with the Ottomans for peace.

== Siege of Kőszeg (Güns) in 1532 ==
In 1532, captain Nikola Jurišić defended the small border fort of Kőszeg (German: Güns) (Kingdom of Hungary) with fewer than 50 soldiers and only 700 Hungarian villagers with no cannons and few guns, preventing the advance of the Turkish army of 120,000–140,000 toward Vienna.

== Later life ==
Following the 1537 Battle of Gorjani, he was again made the supremus capitaneus of Slavonia and Lower Austria. Between 1538 and 1543, he was the capitaneus of Carniola.

He spent the last years of his life as a secret adviser at the court in Vienna. Jurišić died in the region of Kőszeg, Hungary.

== See also ==
- Jurišić
- Little War in Hungary
- Ottoman wars in Europe
