= Kőszeg =

- Town
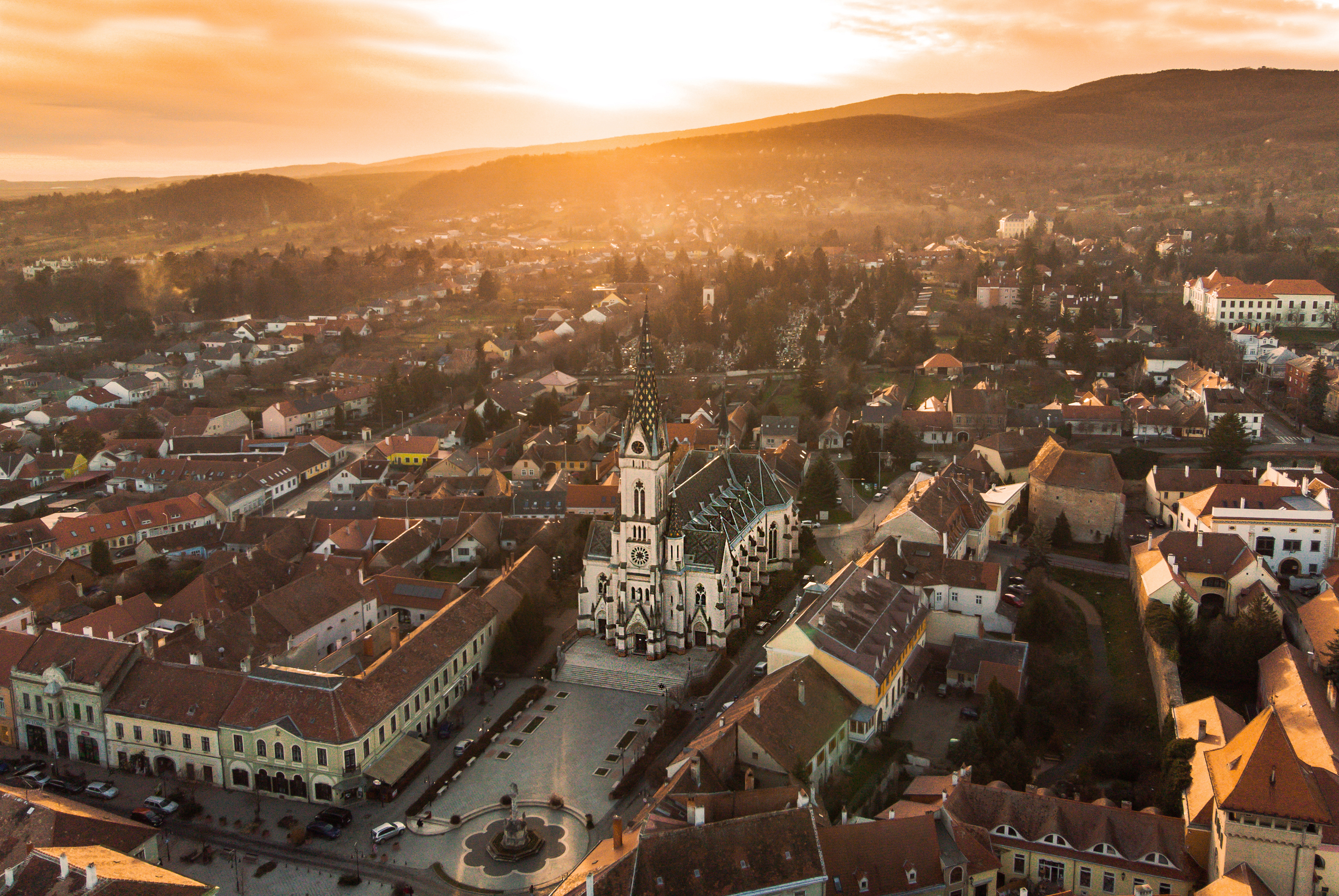
- Main square of Kőszeg with Sacred Heart Church

- Flag Coat of arms

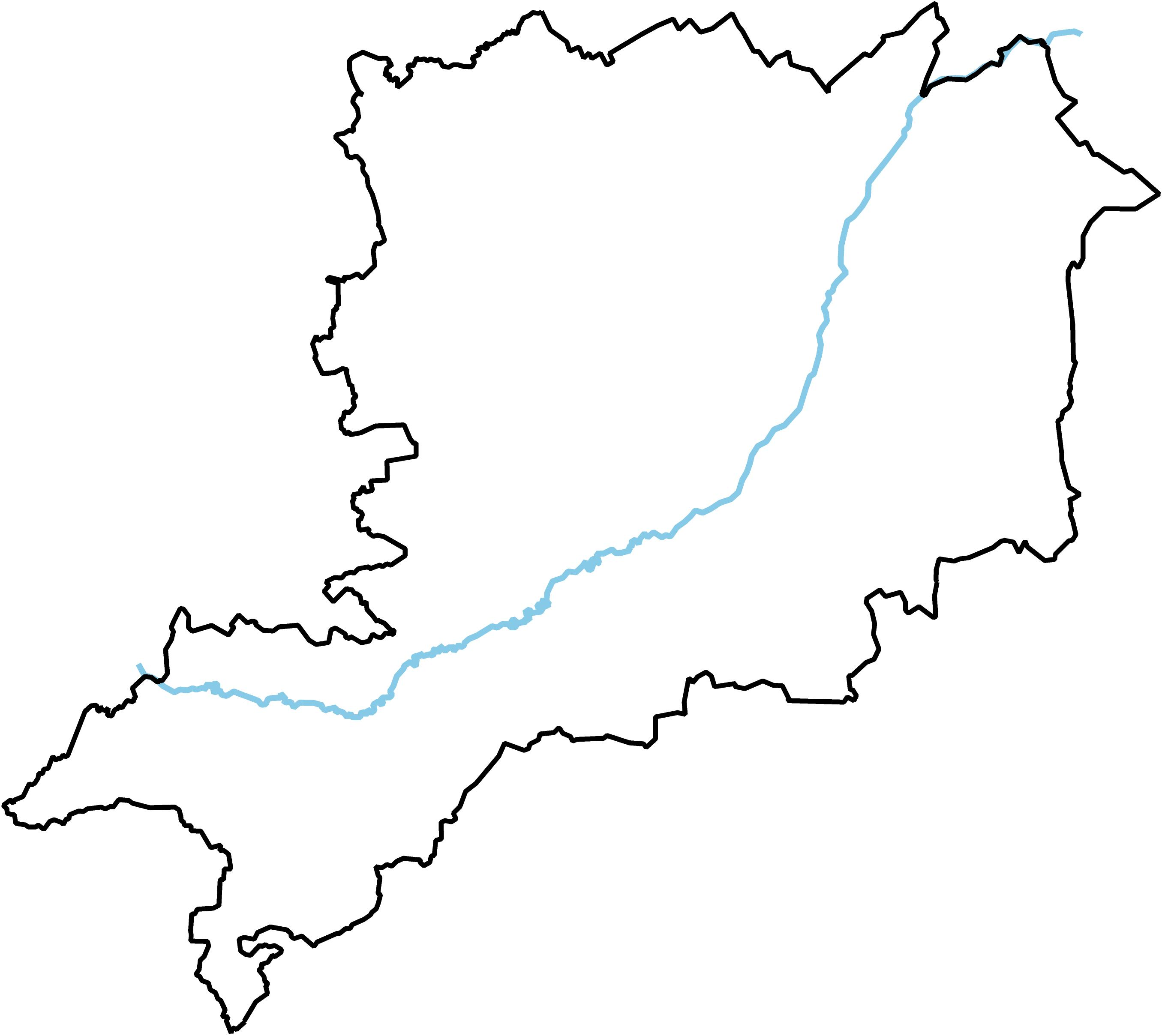
- Location of Kőszeg Kőszeg (Hungary)
- Coordinates: 47.38191°N 16.55221°E
- Country: Hungary
- County: Vas
- District: Kőszeg

Area
  - Total: 54.66 km^{2} (21.10 sq mi)

Population (2012)
  - Total: 11,747 ▲
  - Density: 214.9/km^{2} (556.6/sq mi)
  - Demonym: kőszegi

Population by ethnicity
  - Hungarians: 93.4%
  - Germans: 3.2%
  - Croats: 1.6%
  - Others: 1.8%

Population by Religion
  - Roman Catholics: 72.2%
  - Lutherans: 8.6%
  - Atheists: 5.5%
  - Calvinists: 2.5%
  - Others: 11.2%
- Time zone: UTC+1 (CET)
  - Summer (DST): UTC+2 (CEST)
- Postal code: 9730
- Area code: (+36) 94
- Website: www.koszeg.hu

Kőszeg (Hungarian: [ˈkøːsɛɡ]; Croatian: Kiseg; German: Güns [ɡʏns]; Slovak: Kysak; Slovene: Kiseg) is a town in Vas County, Hungary. The town is known for its historical character.

== History ==
=== Medieval Period ===
The origins of the only free royal town in the historical garrison county of Vas (Eisenburg) go back to the third quarter of the thirteenth century. It was founded by the Kőszegi family, a branch of the Héder clan, who had settled in Hungary in 1157 AD.

Sometime before 1274 Henry I and his son Ivan moved the court of the Kőszegi, a breakaway branch of the family, from Güssing to Kőszeg (Güns). For decades, the town was the seat of the lords of Kőszeg (Güns).

Only in 1327 did Charles Robert of Anjou finally break the power of the Kőszegi family in Western Transdanubia, and a year later, in (1328), elevated the town to royal status. The town boundaries were fixed during the Anjou dynasty (1347–1381).

In 1392 the royal town became a fiefdom, when the Palatinate Nicolas Garai repaid a bond paid to King Sigismund of Luxembourg by the Ellerbach family from Monyorókerék. The Garai era ended in 1441.

In 1445 the city fell to the Austrians and eventually became incorporated into Lower Austria after several attempts by the Hungarians to reclaim it, where it remained until 1647.

=== Little War in Hungary ===
In the third wave of the great wars against the Turks in the sixteenth century, Kőszeg became the major flashpoint of the campaign of 1532. Between August 5–30, Grand Vizier Ibrahim led 19 major assaults against the town. Under the leadership of the town and fort of Croatian captain Nikola Jurišić, a small garrison of only 700–800 Hungarian, Croat and German soldiers repelled an Ottoman force numbering over 100,000 soldiers in the Siege of Kőszeg. After the final unsuccessful attack, the Turkish leadership were forced to decamp due to an uprising by the Janissaries. According to tradition, the last contingent of withdrawing troops were meant to have left the city limits around 11 o'clock. As a memorial to this historic heroism, the church clocks in the town have read 11 o'clock since 1777.

After the Turkish wars, in 1695 the garrison and surrounding areas of Kőszeg fell into the hands of the Esterházy dukes, where it remained until 1931.

The town lost its strategic importance after the Rákóczi-Liberation Wars of 1703–1711. Along with Szombathely, Kőszeg was the most important fortress for the kuruc military leadership from 1705–1708, to liberate and hold onto the areas west of the Rába.

The free royal town enjoyed the longest period of peace in its history during the eighteenth century. For the first time in the history of the town, there was an attempt, in 1712, to replace the population loss in the town by trying to attract colonists, and by founding Schwabendorf (Kőszegfalva).

Kőszeg had already lost its leading role in the garrison county of Vas by the mid nineteenth century. Only a few workshops survived the production crisis within the guild system during the Hungarian reformation of the early nineteenth century. The founding of public companies, societies, and the first financial institution in the county were the first signs of civic development in the town. Alongside the by then typical society made up of small businesses and small traders, Kőszeg developed during this time into a town of schools, sanatoria, and garrisons.

=== Early Modern Period ===
In 1677 the secondary school, Jurisics Miklós Gimnázium (JMG), was founded. It is the oldest operating International School in Hungary. The International Baccalaureate (IB) program, which most English-speaking students at the school follow, was created at the Grande Boissière campus. It is a bilingual school, with instruction in Hungarian, French, German, Italian, and English. The International School is a testing center for the U.S. college boards (SAT, ACT,etc.), as well as the British IGCSE exam.

In 2006, the Herald Tribune listed it as one of the top ten international schools in the world.[2]

According to the Good Schools Guide International, "Students receive a truly international education and as a result, leave as rounded and worldly young people.

=== World War II and the Holocaust ===
During World War II, the Jews of Kőszeg were among the last to be deported to Auschwitz in the summer of 1944. Later that year Nazis established a slave labor camp at Kőszeg, where 4,500 died of typhus. With the impending arrival of the Red Army in 1945, the camp was liquidated. The camp's 2,000 survivors endured a "death march" of about 300 kilometres (190 mi) for several weeks over the Alps to Ebensee.

When the Red Army approached Kőszeg in March, 1945, the Hungarian commander, Béla Király, surrendered the city to spare it further destruction.

=== Communist Period ===
The use of the Jurisics Castle for cultural purposes has been on the agenda since 1954. On 31 August 1963, the renovated building complex was inaugurated in a series of large-scale celebrations.

In 1966, a ski jumping rampart was established on Kenyér Hill, and it is still used by the Kőszeg Ski Jumping Section. In the development of winter sports, the Chernel István ski slope was opened in 1972.

The new building of the border crossing was inaugurated in 1968, which was closed in 2007 with the accession to the Schengen Agreement, and today it stands empty. In the same year, the events of the harvest in Kőszeg began, first every two years, then annually, which developed into a harvest carnival with international participants.

In 1971, during the period of the Fourth Five-Year Plan, mass housing construction began. Instead of the barracks in the northern part of the city, a housing estate was established in four phases in the southern part of the city. The new part of the city is now called New Town, previously (from 1975) it was named after Lieutenant General János Kiss, in whose memory a bust was unveiled in 1983.

In 1978, the settlement received the János Hild Memorial Medal for its achievements in the field of "city-wide monument protection...". The Boating Lake and the public park created there were inaugurated. The building of Hotel Írottkő on the Main Square was completed in 1979. In 1982, the Park Hotel, which was converted from the building of the Verbita Mission House, was completed, which has been fulfilling its original function since the change of regime.

=== After Communism ===
Since 1992 Kőszeg is again living under a normal administrative system and a market economy. The financially feeble town is looking at options for renewal through an injection of capital from outside investors and is seeking support from government agencies and the European Union.

Kőszeg has managed to retain its natural charm and the beauty of its architecture. Only the bastion gates have been damaged significantly. The structure of the town remains unaltered.

Today Kőszeg is one of the most attractive towns in Hungary and is a tourist destination. Kőszeg was awarded the Hild Prize (Hungarian architecture prize) in 1978 for preserving its architectural heritage.

Every year, it hosts the Castle Days at the castle there, commemorating and reenacting the siege by Ottoman Turks on the way to Vienna, in which the defenders were able to hold out.

== Demographics ==
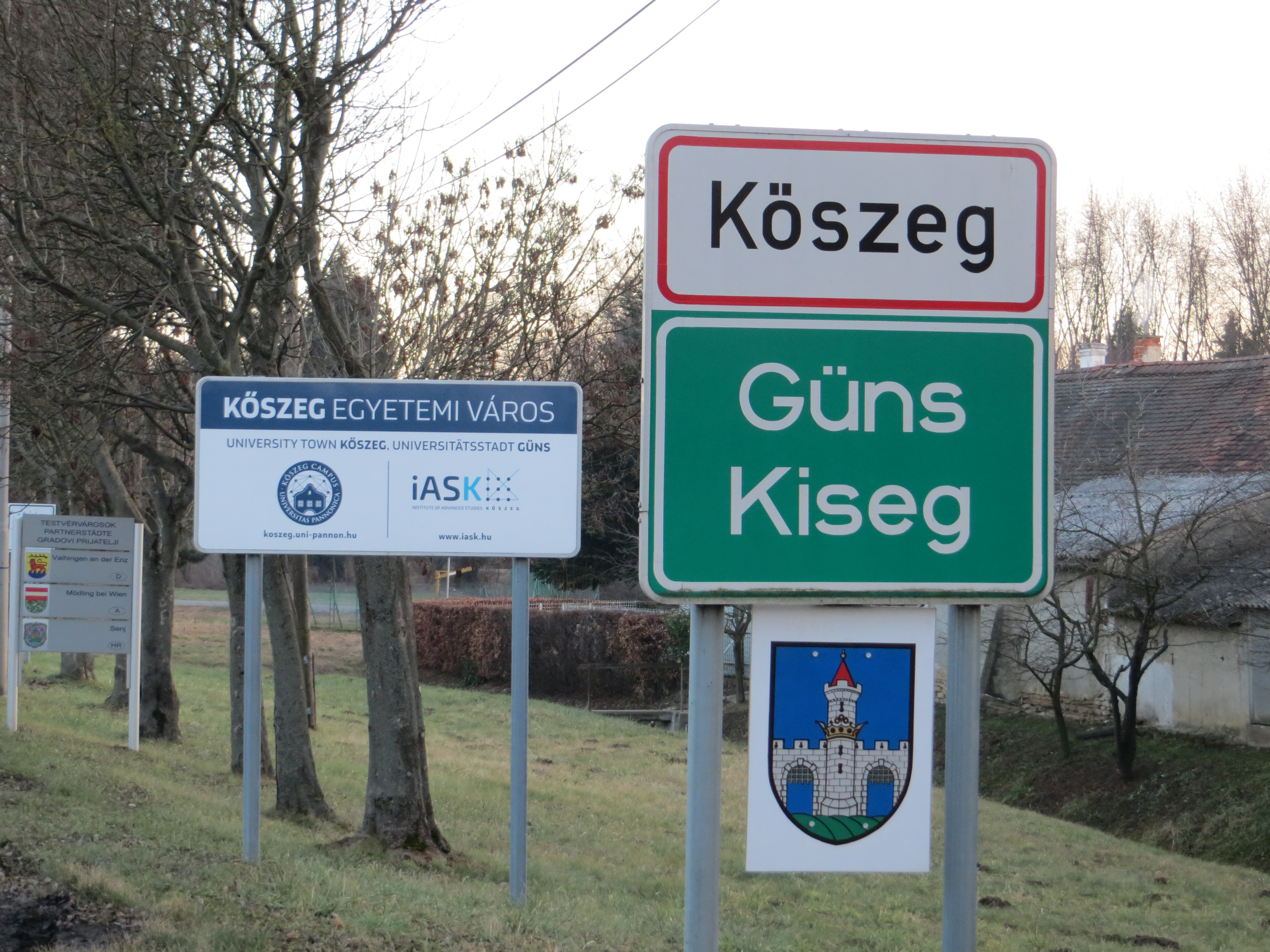
City limit sign in three languages

In 1880 Kőszeg had 7,301 inhabitants with ethnic German majority (in 1495, 1715, and 1784 a German majority existed also). The German citizens mainly were Lutherans, as in Sopron. During Austro-Hungarian times the city population was magyarized.

After the Second World War officially, 117 Germans were expelled, but in fact more German-speaking people were deported because the town's population declined from 10,320 (in 1941) to 8,780 (in 1949). During the communist era the remaining Germans assimilated to the Magyars. In 2001 Kőszeg had 11,844 inhabitants, 93.4% Magyars, 3.2% Germans, 1.6% Croats. The distribution of religions were: 72.2% Roman Catholic, 8.6% Lutheran, 2.5% Calvinist, 1.1% others, 5.5% Atheist, 10.1% no answer, unknown (2001 census).

In the 21st century, the community has a mix of Germans, Hungarians, and Croatians.

== Sights of interest ==
- Jurisics Castle and Castle Museum
- Town centre with its medieval atmosphere - including the town hall, which is the oldest townhall in all of Hungary.
- Sacred Heart Church
- Steierhäuser
- Pharmacy Museum
- Hills around Kőszeg
- the Geschriebenstein (Írottkő)
- Seven fountains (Hétforrás)
- Watchtower (Óház)

== Sport ==
Although the ski jumping facility is a small one, it is the only still in use in the country.

== Twin towns – sister cities ==
Kőszeg is a founding member of the Douzelage, a unique town twinning association of towns across the European Union, including United Kingdom. This active town twinning began in 1991 and there are regular events, such as a produce market from each of the other countries and festivals. Other members of Douzelage are:

- Agros, Cyprus
- Altea, Spain
- Asikkala, Finland
- Bad Kötzting, Germany
- Bellagio, Italy
- (Republic of Ireland) Bundoran, Ireland
- Chojna, Poland
- Granville, France
- Holstebro, Denmark
- Houffalize, Belgium
- Judenburg, Austria
- Marsaskala, Malta
- Meerssen, Netherlands
- Niederanven, Luxembourg
- Oxelösund, Sweden
- Preveza, Greece
- Rokiškis, Lithuania
- Rovinj, Croatia
- Sesimbra, Portugal
- Sherborne, United Kingdom
- Sigulda, Latvia
- Siret, Romania
- Škofja Loka, Slovenia
- Sušice, Czech Republic
- Tryavna, Bulgaria
- Türi, Estonia
- Zvolen, Slovakia
- Horgos, Serbia

Kőszeg is also twinned with:

- Mödling, Austria
- Senec, Slovakia
- Senj, Croatia
- Vaihingen an der Enz, Germany

== Notable people ==
- András Arató (*1945), electrical engineer, model, and meme
- László Dvorák (*1964), wrestler
- József Fabchich (1753–1809), writer and translator
- István Fászl (1838-1900), naturalist, priest and teacher
- Imre Festetics (1710–1790), geneticist
- András Hadik (1711–1790), nobleman, military leader
- Johann Baptiste Horvath (1732–1799), physicist
- Zoltán Kereki (*1953), footballer
- Henriett Koósz (*1980), Austrian wheelchair tennis player
- Philipp Schey von Koromla (1798–1881), merchant and philanthropist
- Friedrich Schey von Koromla (1815–1881), Austrian businessman
- Ágota Kristóf (1935–2011), writer
- Gyula Lóránt (1923–1981), football player and manager
- Nikolaus von Üxküll-Gyllenband (1877–1964), German businessman

== Gallery ==
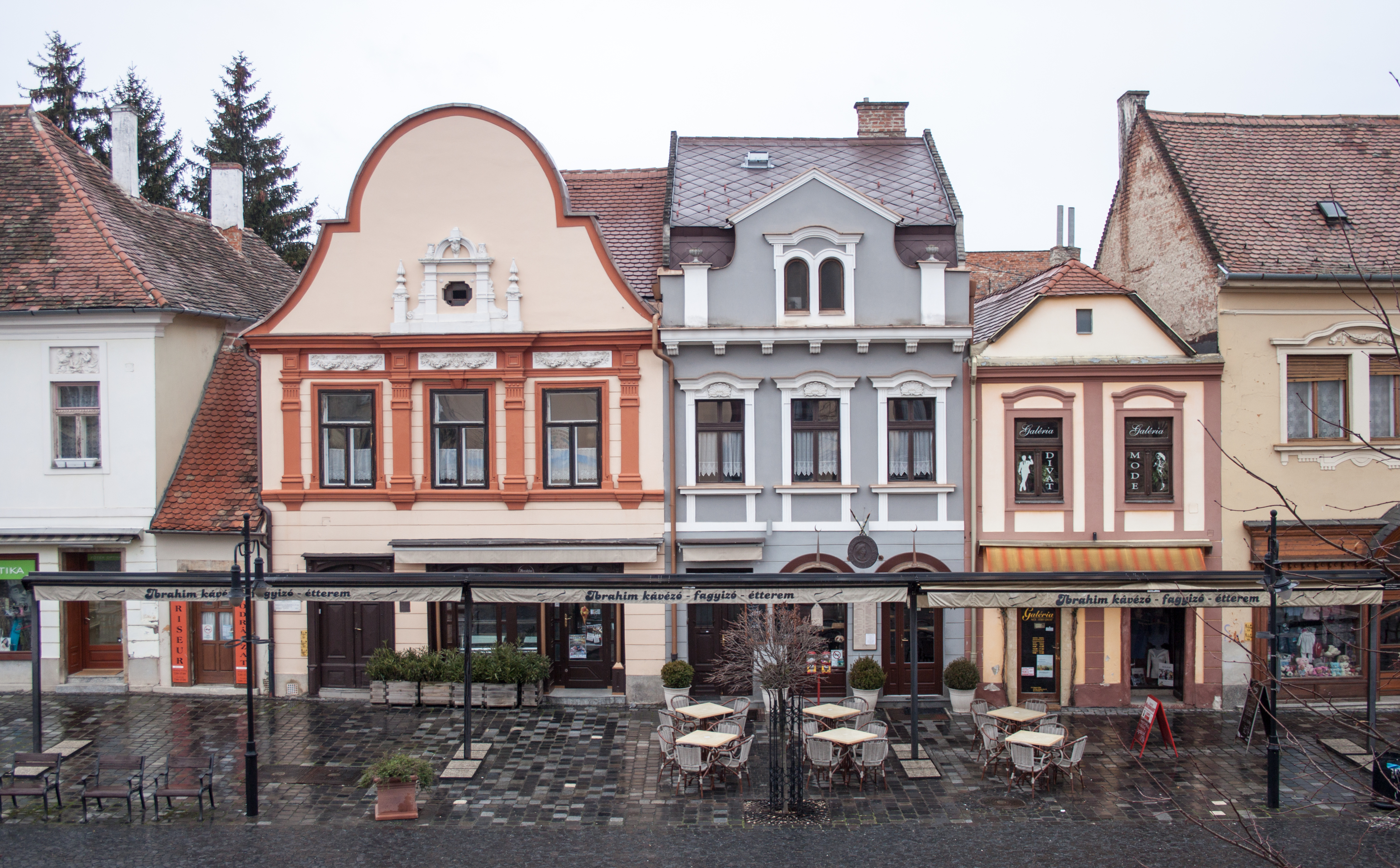
Main Square

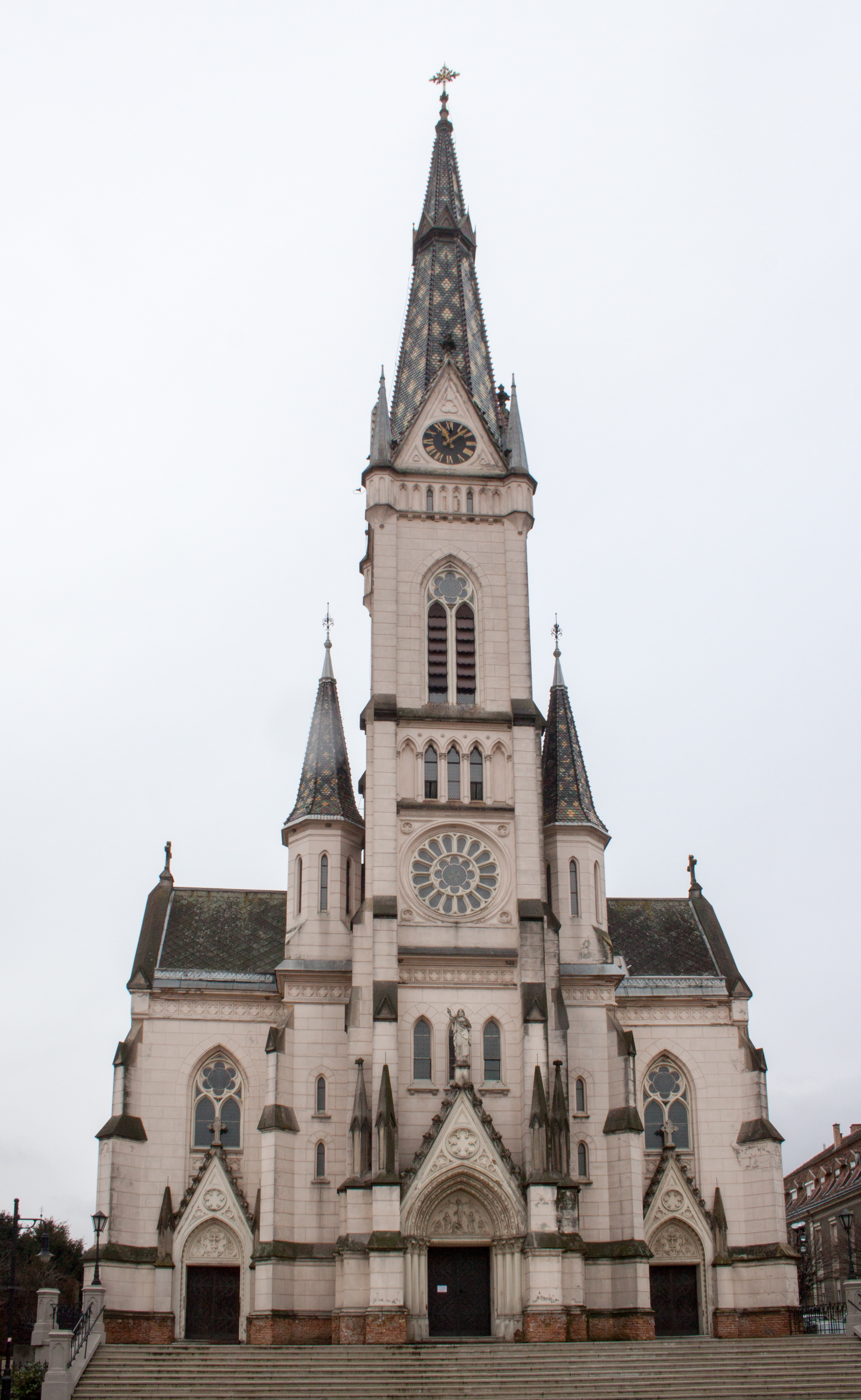
Sacred Heart Church in the Main Square

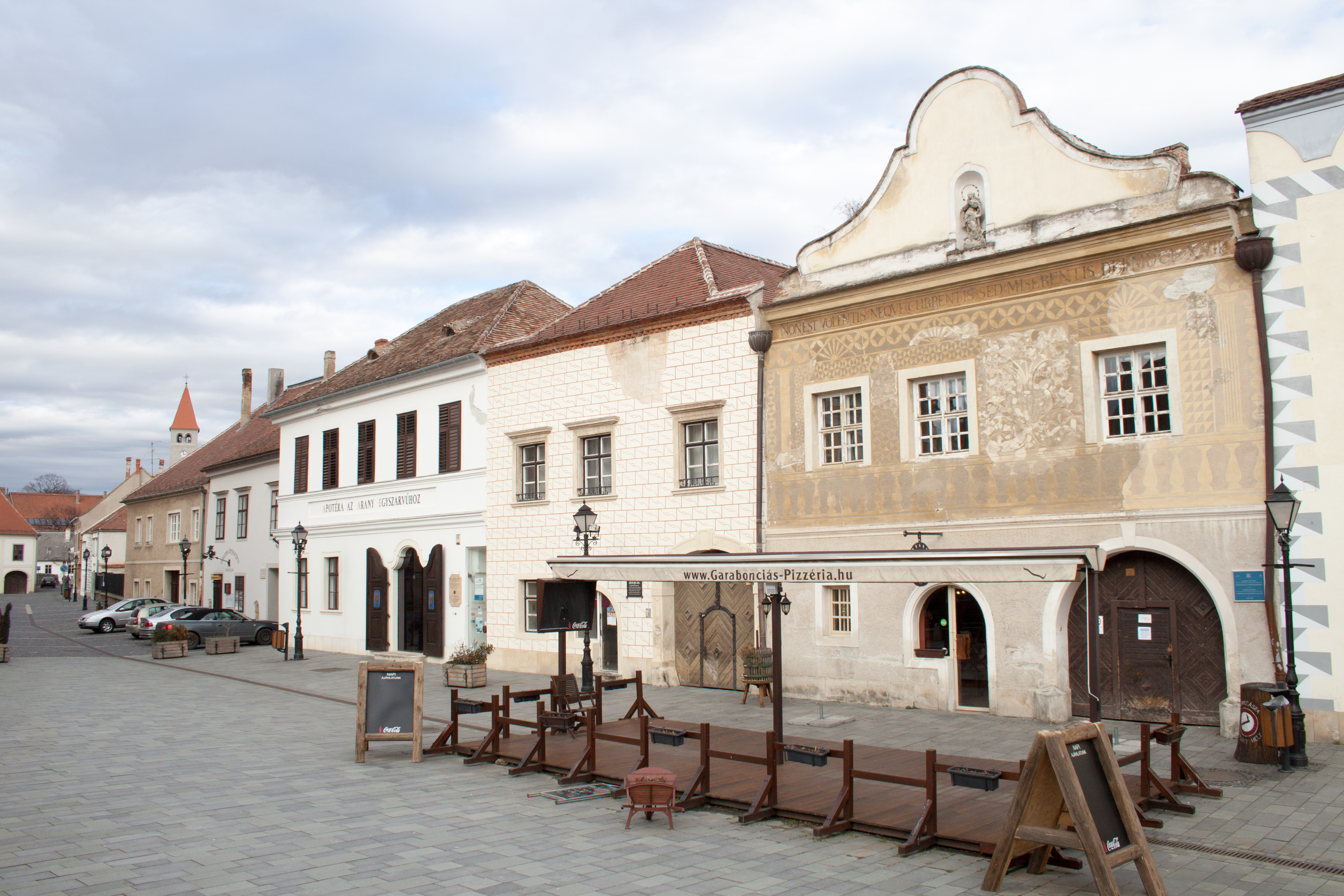
Jurisics Square

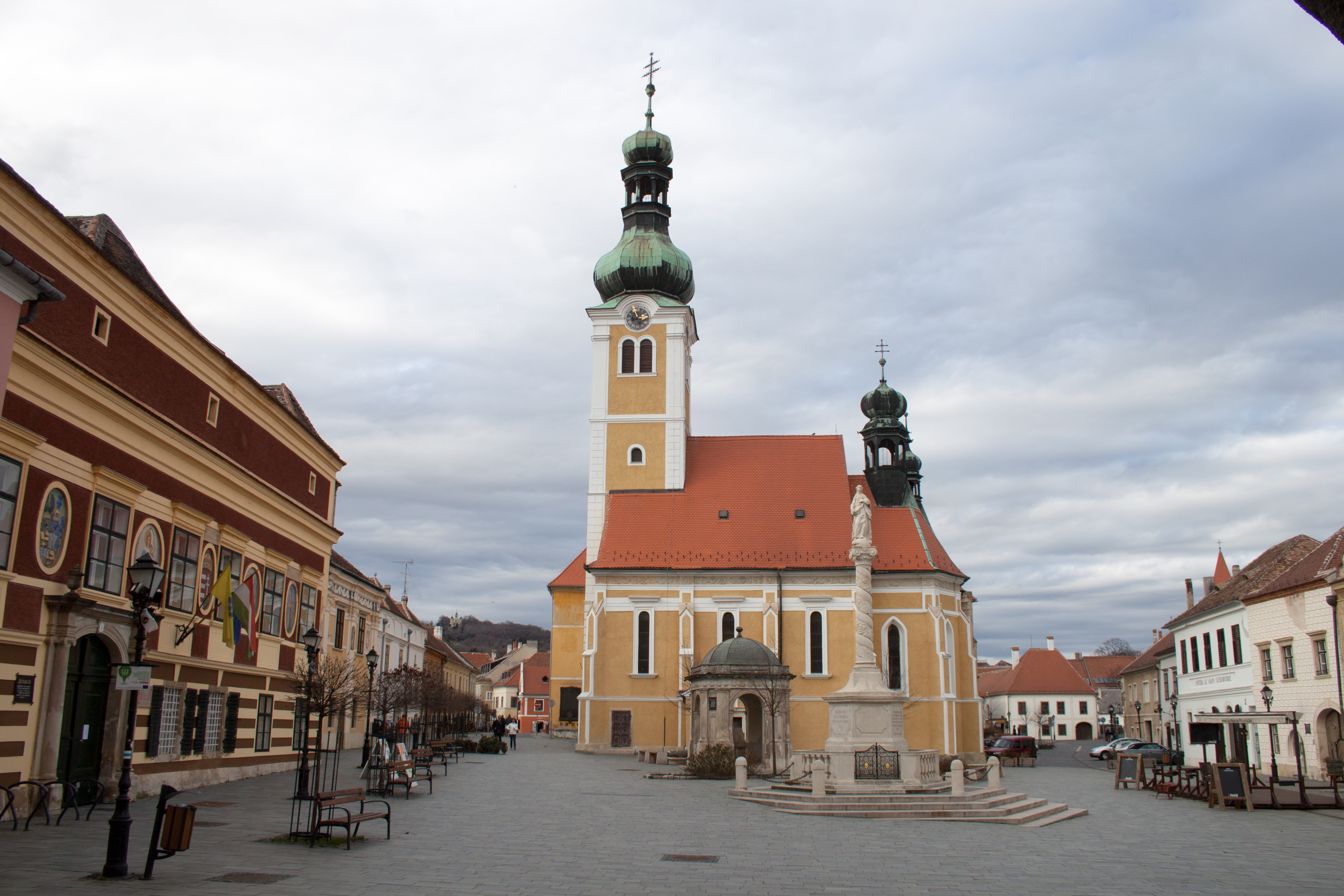
Saint Emeric church in the Jurisics Square

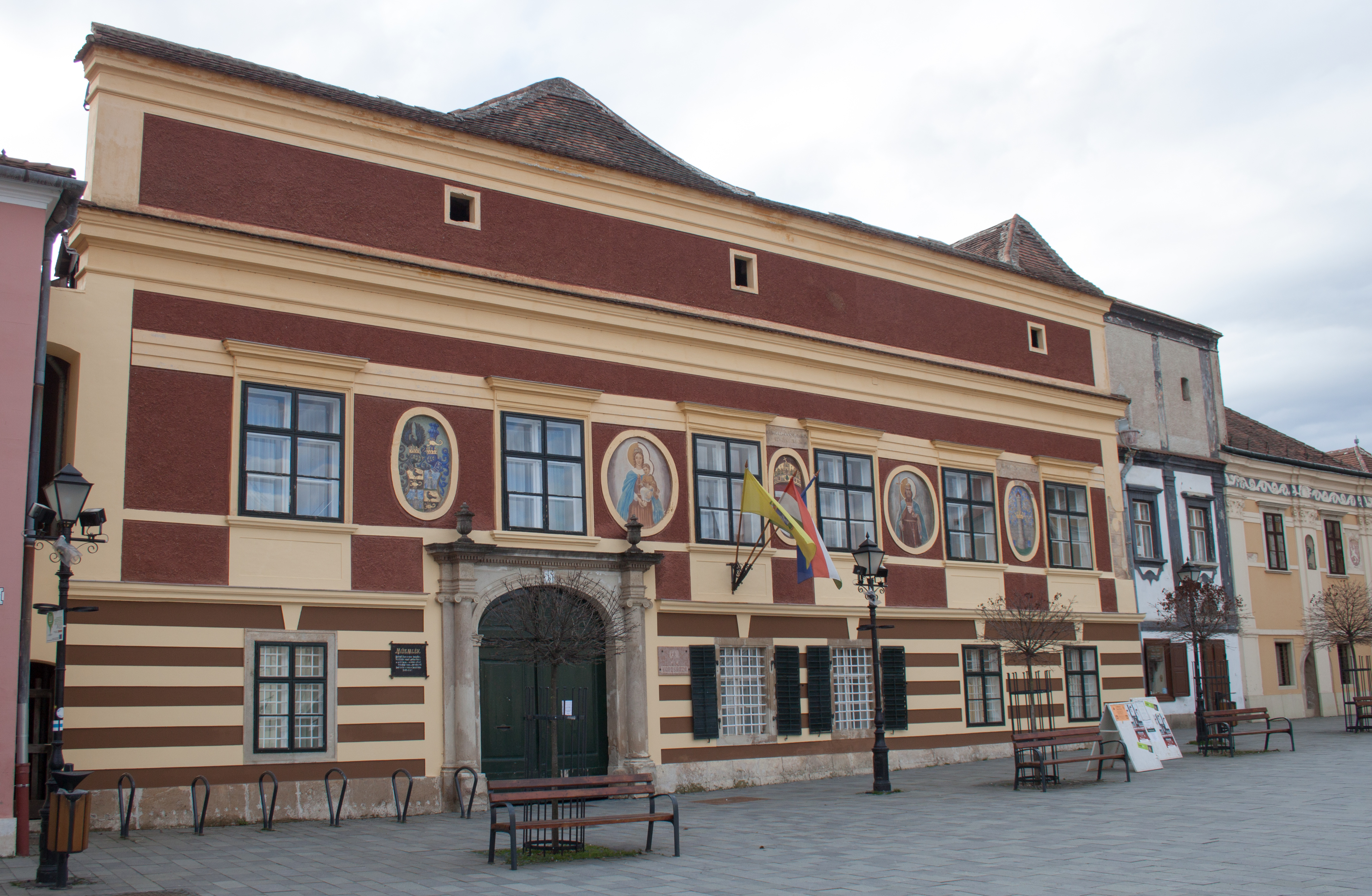
Town hall

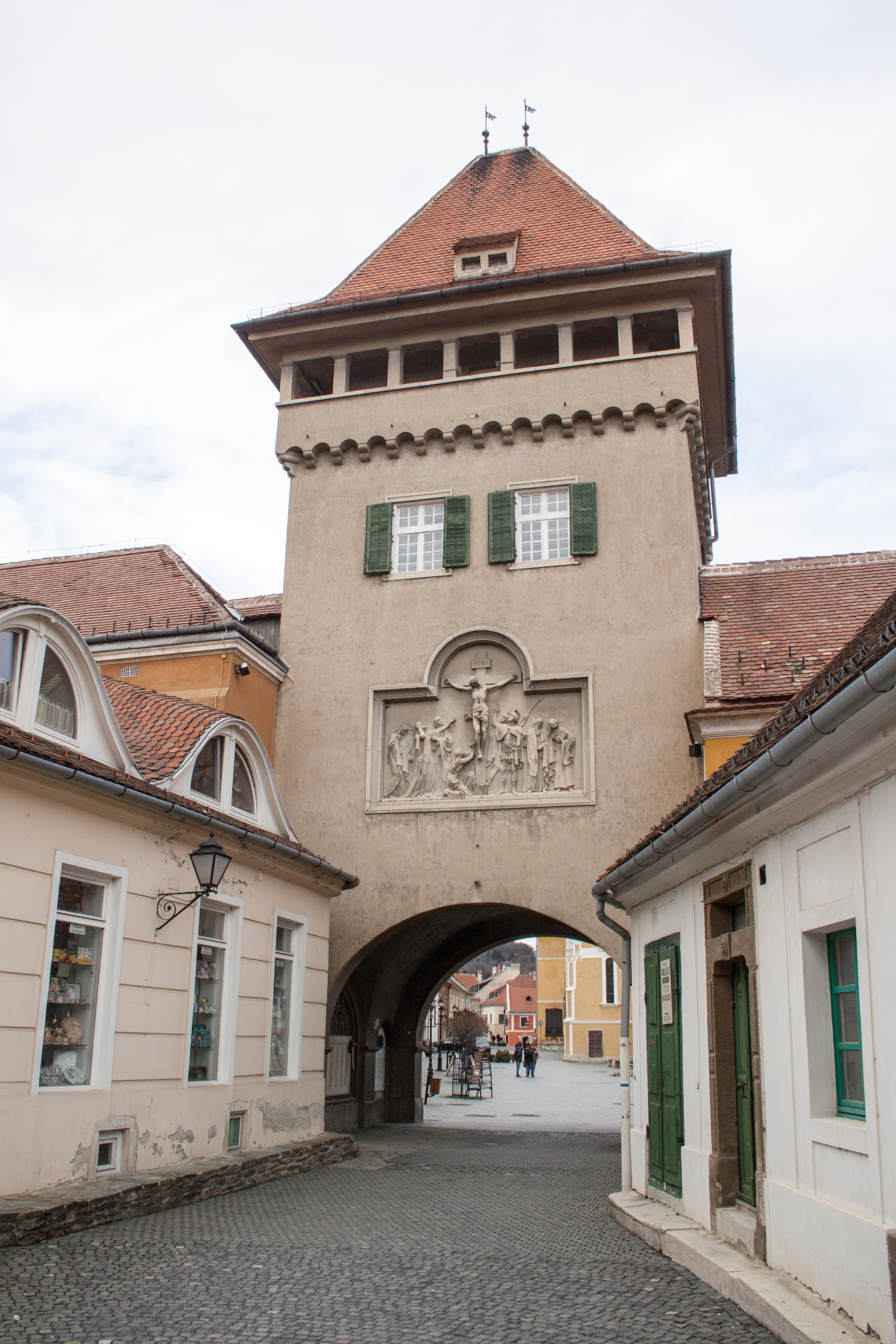
Tower of Heroes

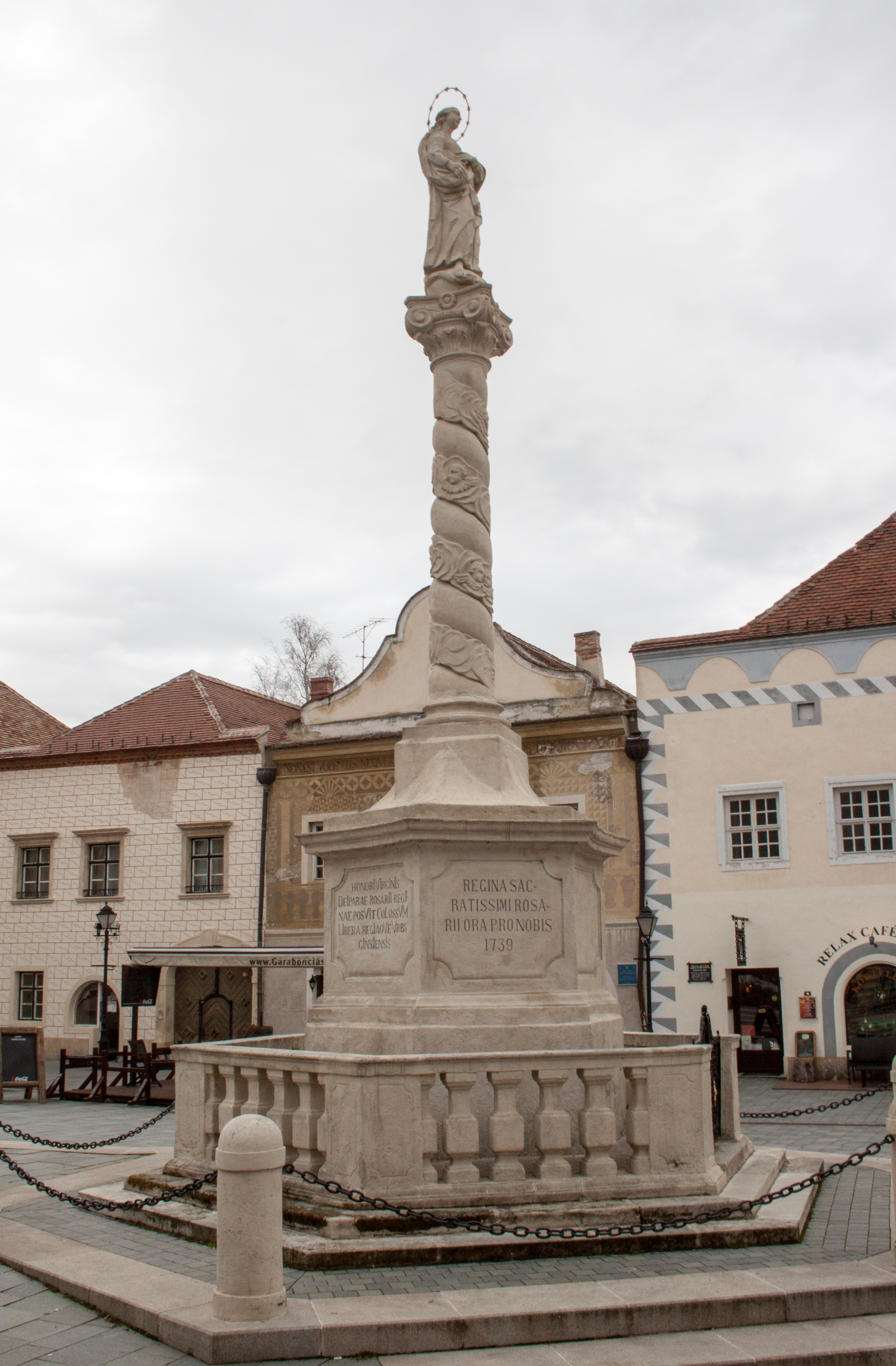
Maria column

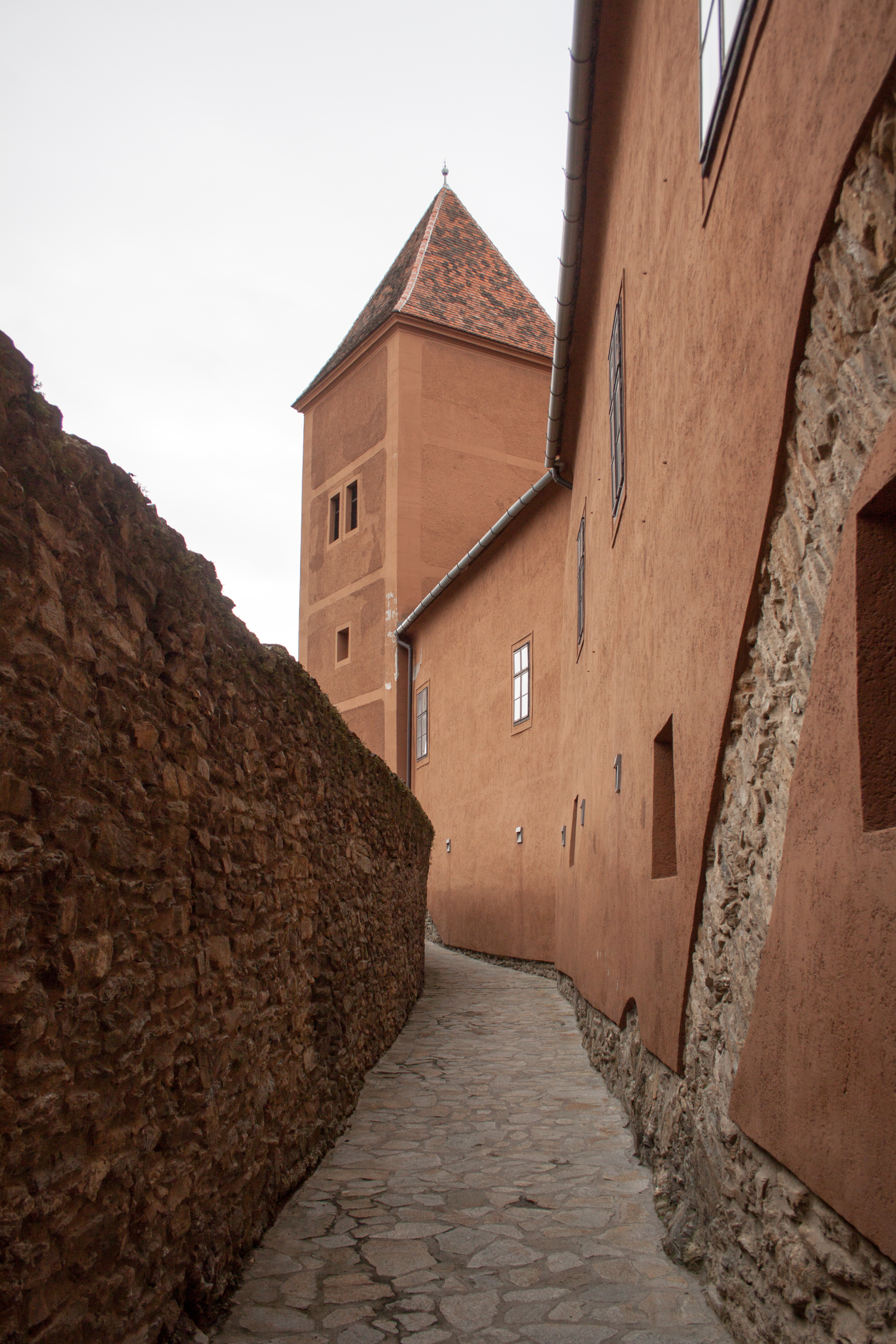
Jurisics Castle

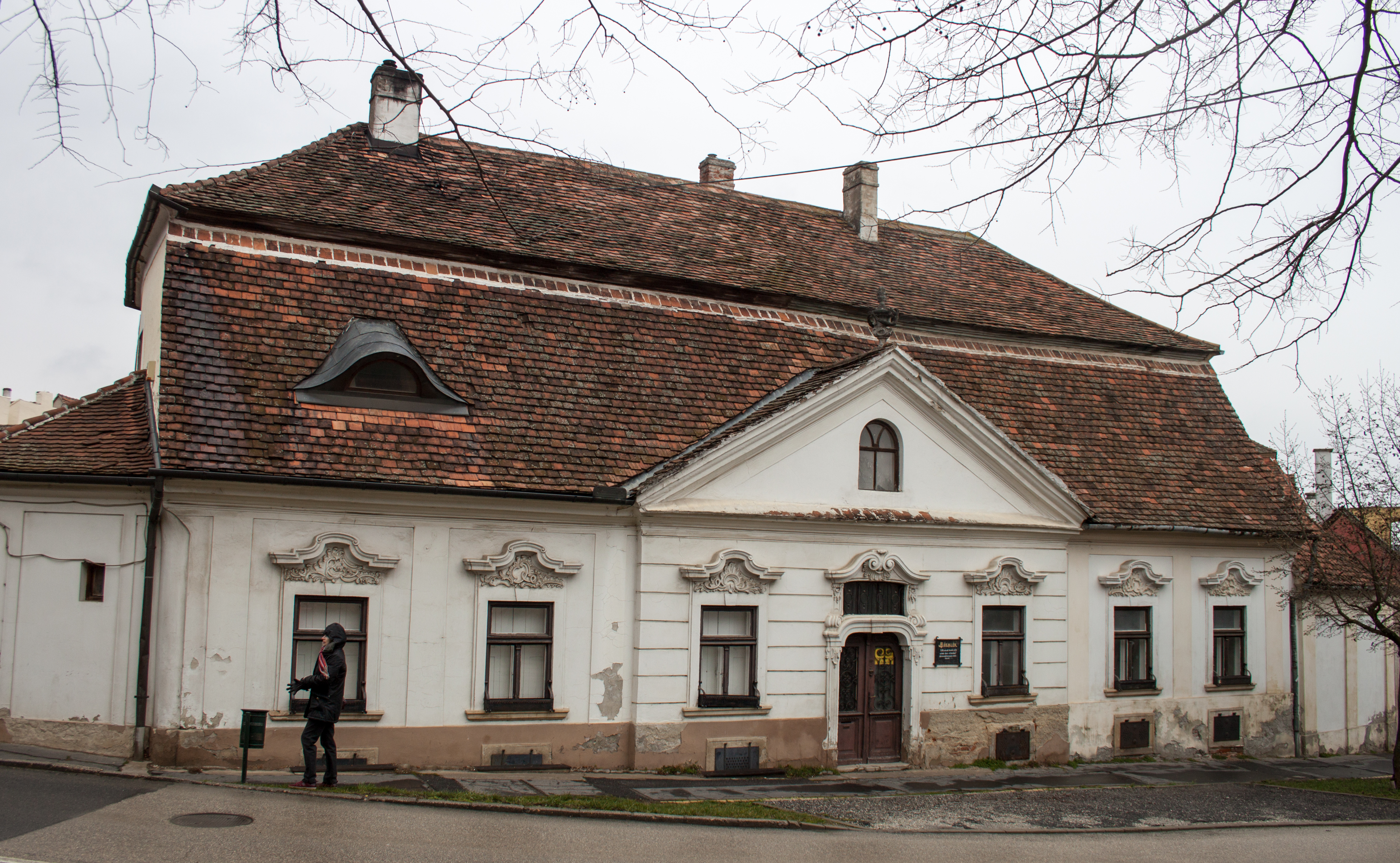
Baroque building

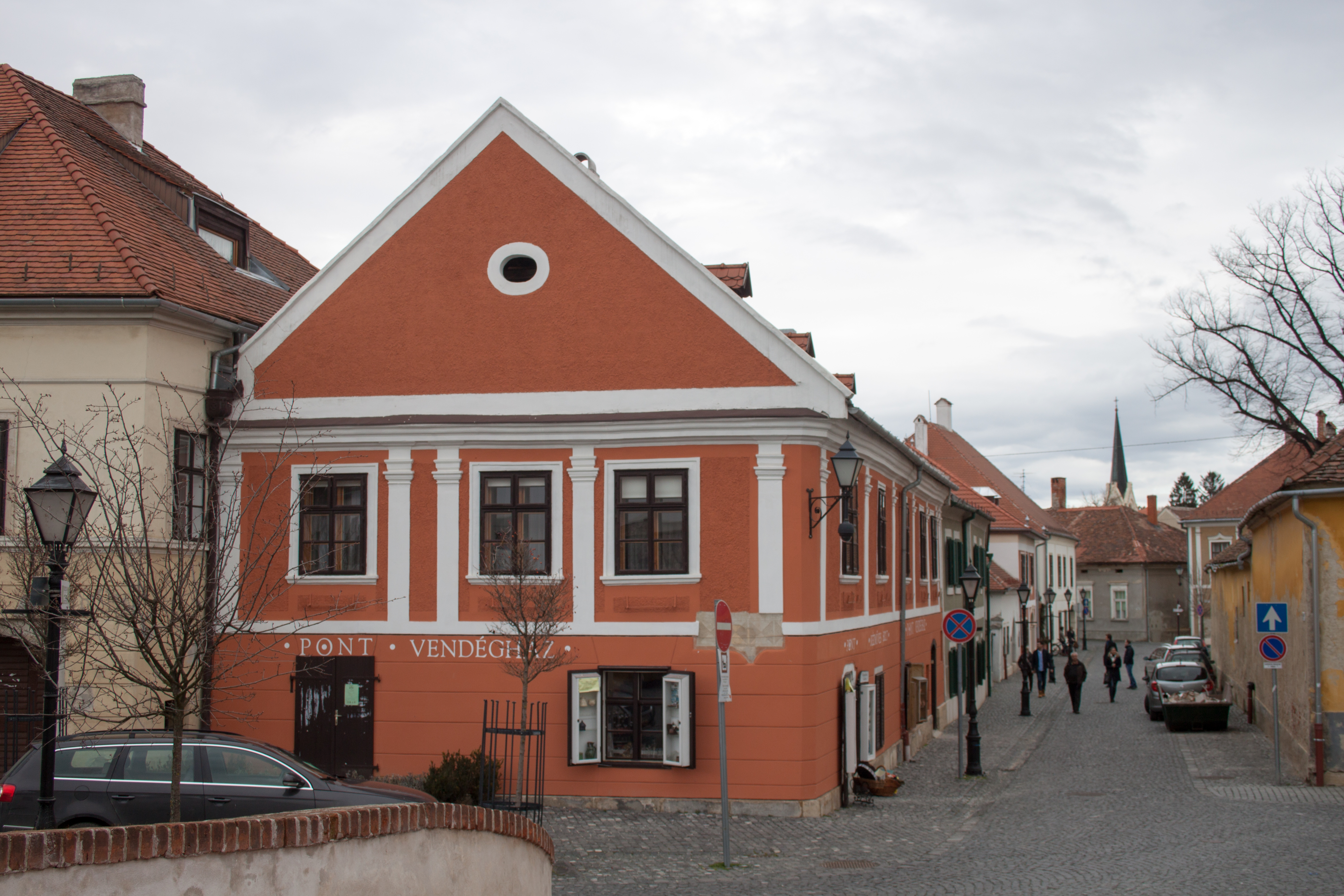
Downtown detail

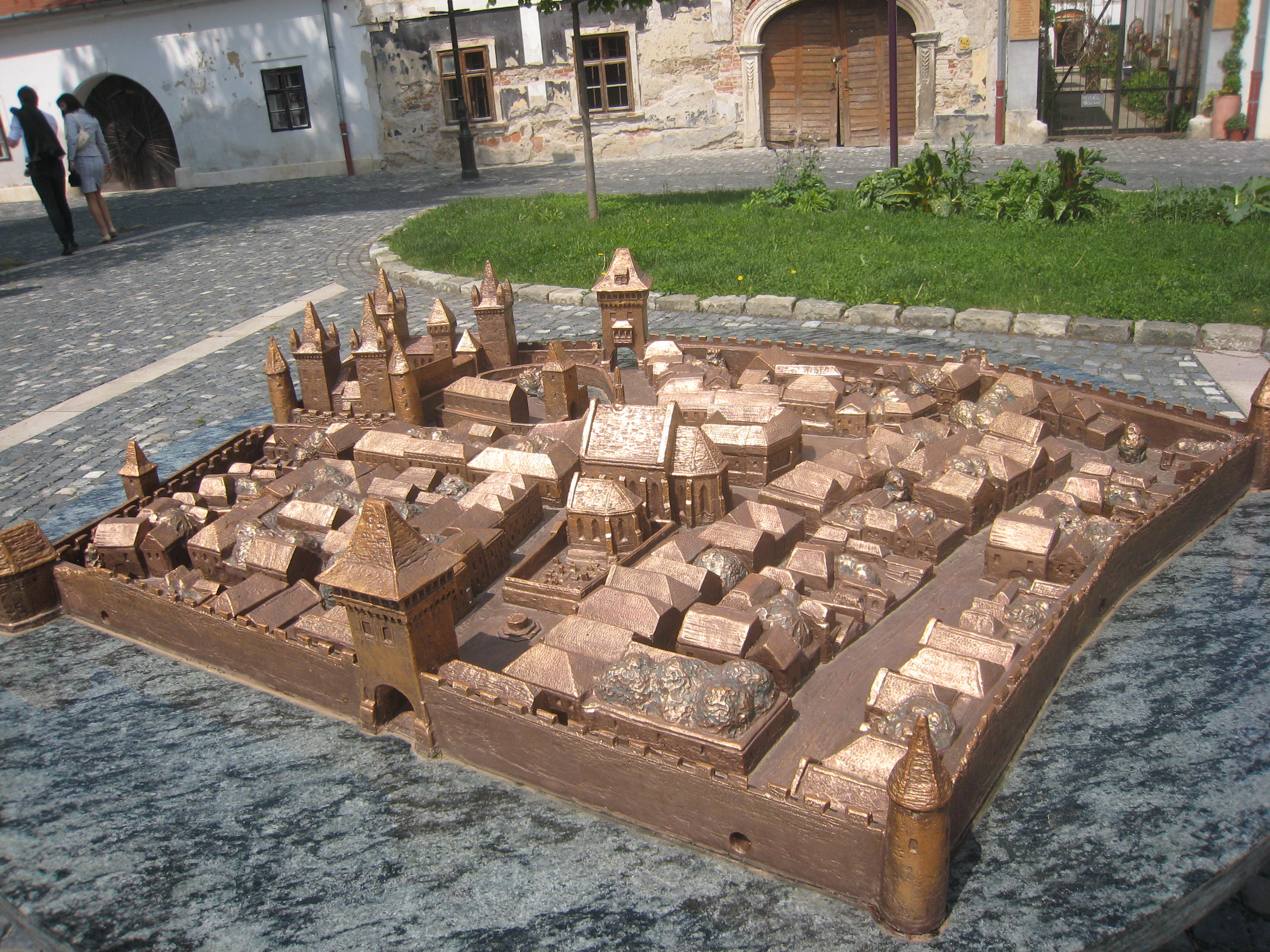
Public maquette of the town in the Middle Ages

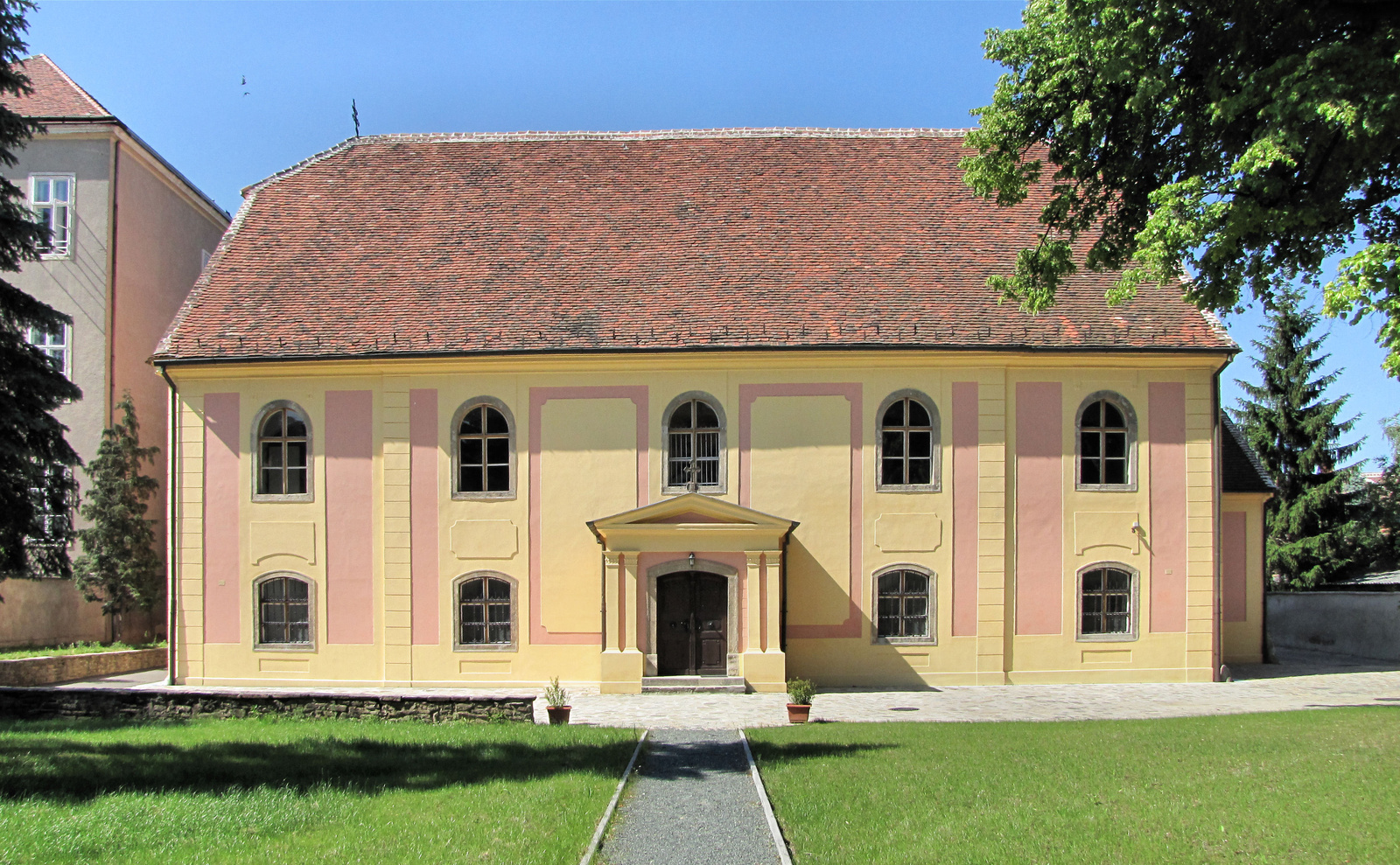
Lutheran church
