= Zoltán Kőszegi =

Hungarian politician

Member of the National Assembly
- In office 14 May 2010 – 5 May 2014

Personal details
- Born: 1964 (age 61–62) Dabas, Hungary
- Party: Fidesz
- Children: 4
- Profession: gymnastic coach

Zoltán Kőszegi (born 1964) is a Hungarian politician, member of the National Assembly (MP) from Fidesz Pest County Regional List from 2010 to 2014.

He is the current mayor of Dabas since 1998. Kőszegi was a member of the Committee on Foreign Affairs from 14 May 2010 to 28 February 2011 and of the Committee on Education, Science and Research from 14 February 2011 to 5 March 2012. He worked in the Committee of National Cohesion since 1 January 2011. He was appointed a member of the Committee on Human Rights, Minority, Civic and Religious Affairs on 5 March 2012.

== Personal life ==
He is married and has four children.
