= Đurišić =

Đurišić (Serbian Cyrillic: Ђуришић; also transliterated Djurišić) is a surname. Notable people with the surname include:

- Duško Đurišić (born 1977), Montenegrin football player
- Milan Đurišić (born 1987), Montenegrin football player
- Nikola Đurišić (born 2004), Serbian basketball player, son of Duško Đurišić
- Pavle Đurišić (1909–1945), Montenegrin Serb Chetnik commander
- Pavle Đurišić (born 2000), Montenegrin basketball player
