= Siege of Kőszeg =

Part of the Ottoman-Habsburg wars in 1532

Coordinates: 47°23′17″N 16°32′30″E

Siege of Güns (Kőszeg)
- Part of the Little War in Hungary within the Ottoman–Habsburg wars and the Habsburg–Ottoman war of 1529–1533
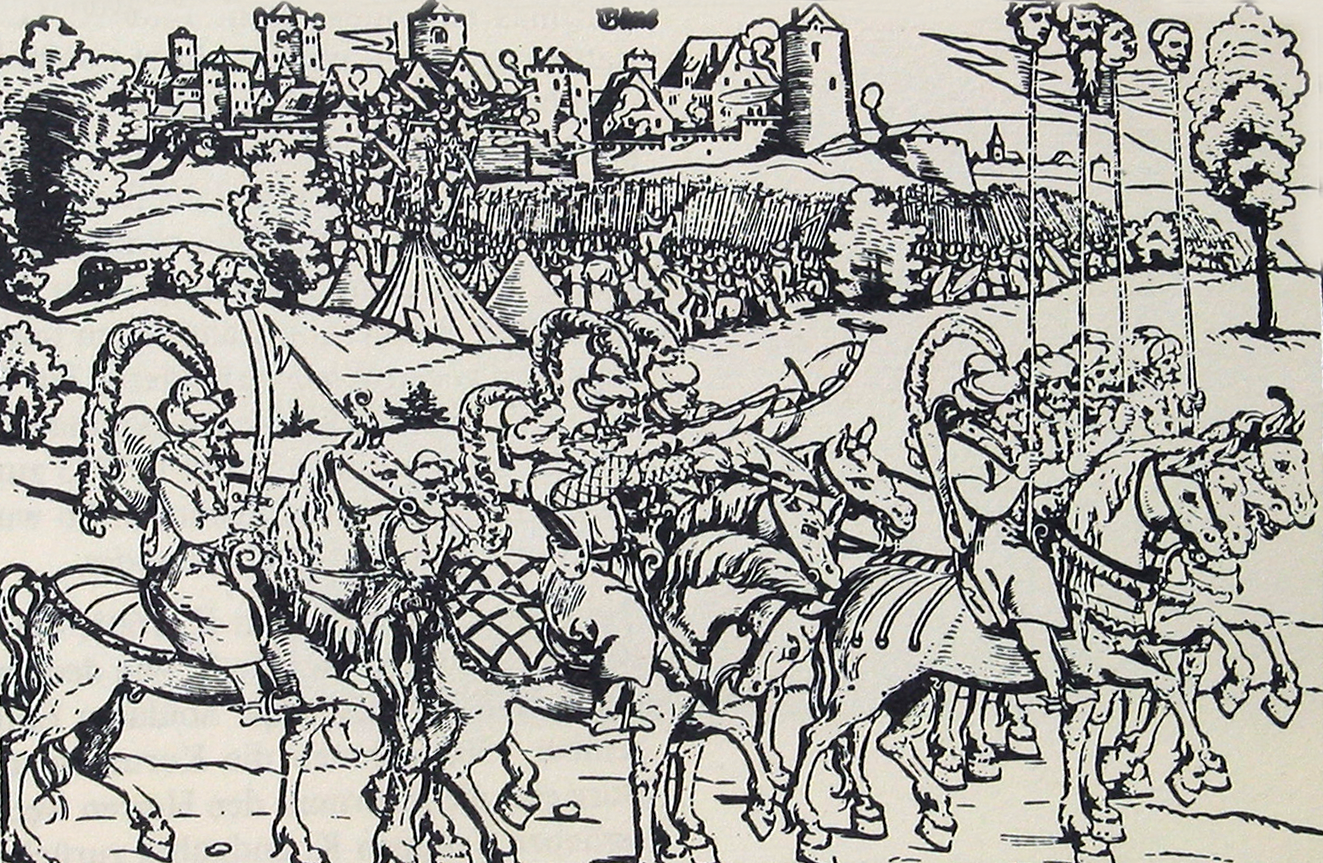
- Edward Schön: Siege of Güns
Date	5–30 August 1532
Location	Kőszeg, Kingdom of Hungary
Result	The defenders prevented the Ottoman advance into Vienna

Belligerents
Habsburg Monarchy: Kingdom of Hungary; Kingdom of Croatia	Ottoman Empire

Commanders and leaders
Nikola Jurišić (WIA)	Suleiman the Magnificent; Pargali Ibrahim Pasha

Strength
700–800	100,000–120,000

Casualties and losses
Heavy	Moderate losses

The siege of Kőszeg (Hungarian: Kőszeg ostroma) or siege of Güns (Turkish: Güns Kuşatması), also known as the German campaign (Turkish: Alman Seferi) was a siege of Kőszeg (German: Güns) in the Western Kingdom of Hungary which ruled by Ferdinand I, a Habsburg king, that took place in 1532. During the siege, the defending forces of the Habsburg monarchy under the leadership of Croatian Captain Nikola Jurišić (Hungarian: Jurisics Miklós), defended the small border fort of Kőszeg with fewer than 50 soldiers and only 700 Hungarian villagers, with no cannons and few guns. The defenders prevented the advance of the Ottoman army of over 100,000 toward Vienna, under the leadership of Sultan Suleiman the Magnificent (Ottoman Turkish: سليمان, romanized: Süleymān) and Pargalı Ibrahim Pasha.

The exact outcome is unknown since there are two versions that differ. In the first version, Nikola Jurišić rejected the offer to surrender on favourable terms; in the second version, the city was offered terms for a nominal surrender, which the garrison accepted. Suleiman, having been delayed nearly four weeks, withdrew at the arrival of the August rains, and did not continue towards Vienna as he had intended, but turned homeward.

Suleiman secured his possession in Hungary by conquering several other forts, but after the Ottoman withdrawal, Habsburg king Ferdinand I reoccupied some of the devastated territory. Suleiman and Ferdinand then concluded the 1533 Treaty of Constantinople, which confirmed the right of John Zápolya as a king of Hungary but recognised Ferdinand's possession of some of the reoccupied territory.

== Background ==
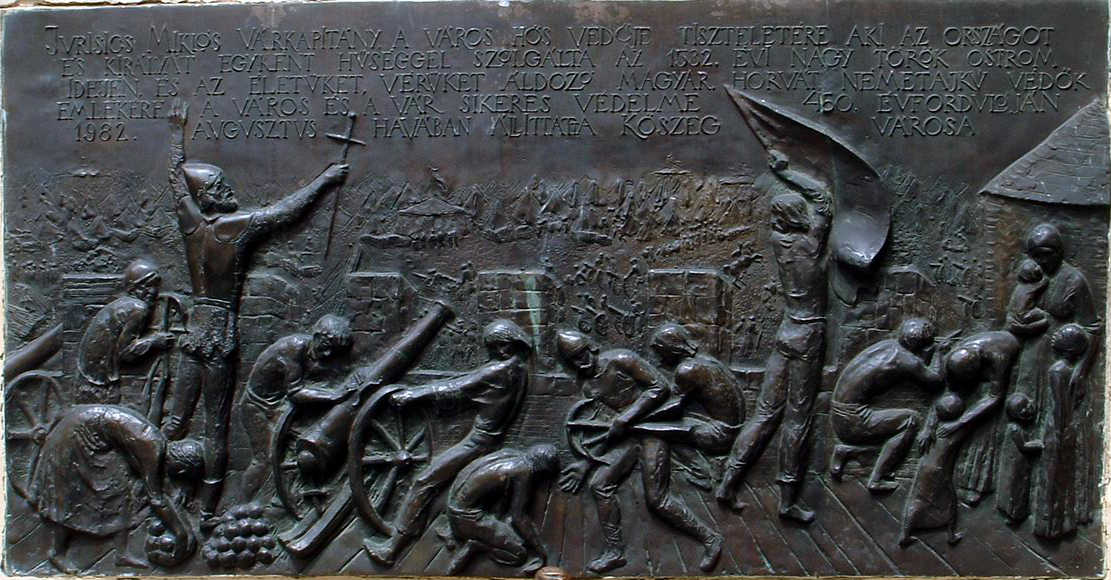
Monument of the siege of Kőszeg, located in the bourg of Kőszeg

On 29 August 1526, at the Battle of Mohács, the Hungarian and Christian forces led by King Louis II of Hungary were defeated by Ottoman forces led by Sultan Suleiman the Magnificent. Louis was killed in the battle, which resulted in the end of the independent Kingdom of Hungary as he died without an heir. Both the Kingdoms of Hungary and Croatia became disputed territories with claims from both King John I who was elected by Hungarian nobility and Habsburg King Ferdinand I who was elected by another part of the nobility. Habsburg Archduke and later Emperor from 1556, Ferdinand I, who was a brother of Holy Roman Emperor Charles V, had married the sister of Louis II and was elected King by the nobles of both Hungary and Croatia. (Note: In 1527, the Croatian nobles met in Cetin to elect Ferdinand as their king.)

The throne of Hungary became the subject of a dynastic dispute between Ferdinand and John Zápolya from Transylvania, since Suleiman had promised to make Zápolya the ruler of all Hungary. During the Hungarian campaign of 1527–1528, Ferdinand captured Buda from John Zápolya in 1527, only to relinquish his hold on it in 1529 when an Ottoman counter-attack stripped Ferdinand of all his territorial gains during 1527 and 1528. The Siege of Vienna in 1529 was the first attempt by Suleiman the Magnificent to capture the Austrian capital. This siege signalled the pinnacle of Ottoman power and the maximum extent of Ottoman expansion in central Europe.

=== Little War in Hungary ===
Following Suleiman's unsuccessful siege of Vienna in 1529, Ferdinand launched a counter-attack in 1530 to regain the initiative and avenge the destruction brought by Suleiman's 120,000 strong army. This campaign is usually considered as the start of the Little War, the period of a series of conflicts between the Habsburgs and the Ottoman Empire. An assault of Buda was driven off by John Zápolya, the vassal King of Hungary, but Ferdinand was successful elsewhere, capturing Gran (Esztergom) and other forts along the Danube river, a vital strategic frontier.

== Campaign of 1532 ==
During the early period of the Little War in Hungary, Suleiman, as a response to Ferdinand's counter-attack in 1530, and as a part of his fifth imperial campaign (Ottoman Turkish: سفر همايون, Sefer-i humāyūn) (Note: The Ottoman Turkish name for the imperial campaigns, according to Şemseddin Sâmî (Frashëri).) in 1532, led a massive army of over 120,000 troops to besiege Vienna again. Due to Suleiman's rapid advances, Ferdinand feared the Christian forces would not be assembled in time to meet him. On 12 July, Suleiman wrote to Ferdinand from Osijek (German: Esseg) in Slavonia, to assure him of the Ottoman advance. According to the letter, Suleiman's fifth campaign was primarily directed against Charles V, and not personally against Ferdinand. After Suleiman crossed the river Drava at Osijek, instead of taking the usual route for Vienna, he turned westwards into Ferdinand's Hungarian territory. According to historian Andrew Wheatcroft, on the route for Vienna, the Ottoman army had briefly invested and captured seventeen fortified towns or castles. Ferdinand withdrew his army, leaving only 700 men with no cannons and a few guns to defend Kőszeg.

However, in order to make decisive gains, the Ottomans had to take the city quickly, as a large Imperial army, raised in Germany, reinforced by Spanish troops and led by the Emperor Charles V himself was approaching in support of Ferdinand.

=== Siege ===
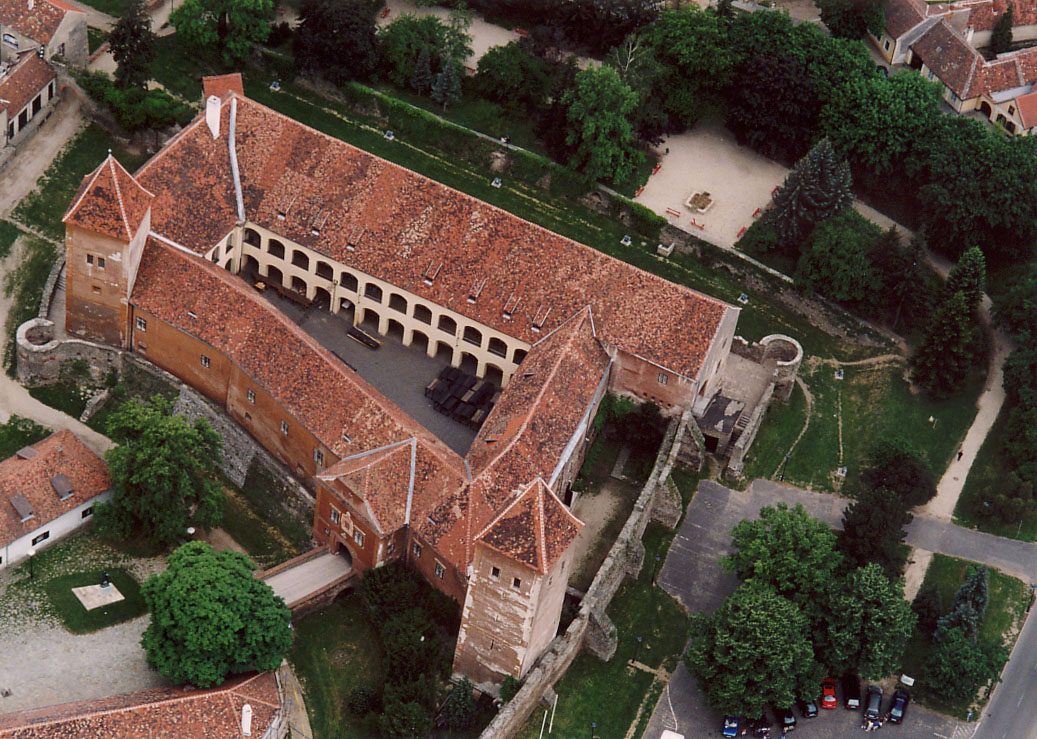
Aerial view of Jurisics Castle in Kőszeg

Located south of Sopron, the small town of Kőszeg was only a few miles from the Austrian border. It was held by a task force commanded by the Croatian soldier and diplomat Nikola Jurišić. Kőszeg was not considered a place of importance. It was an insubstantial obstacle and many stronger places had yielded without a fight. The Grand Vizier of the Ottomans, Ibrahim Pasha, did not realize how poorly defended Kőszeg was. After taking a few minor places, Suleiman came to join Ibrahim Pasha shortly afterwards, when the siege had already started.

The Ottomans met stiff resistance at Kőszeg. Suleiman had hoped that the imperial army would come to relieve Kőszeg, affording him an opportunity for a larger engagement. However, during the Ottoman attacks on Kőszeg, the imperial army still formed up in Regensburg. The Ottomans continued with one attack after another; artillery fire brought down parts of the walls, but brought no surrender. (Note: According to a historian Paolo Giovio, the siege of Güns failed because the Ottomans had not brought large siege guns, expecting to engage the Emperor in a field battle.) The Ottomans' mines were sapped by countermines. The layout of Kőszeg's walls made mining a feasible strategy, but even though several mines succeeded in blowing holes in the fortifications, the defenders held out. For more than twenty-five days, without any artillery, Captain Nikola Jurišić and his garrison with fewer than 50 soldiers and only 700 Hungarian villagers held out against nineteen full-scale assaults and an incessant bombardment by the Ottomans.

There are two versions of the outcome. In the first version, Nikola Jurišić rejected the offer to surrender on favourable terms, and the Ottomans retreated. In the second version, the city was offered terms for a nominal surrender. The only Ottomans who would be allowed to enter the castle would be a token force who would raise the Ottoman flag.

In both versions, Suleiman withdrew at the arrival of the August rains, and returned homeward instead of continuing towards Vienna as previously planned. He had been delayed nearly four weeks, and during this time a powerful army had been collected in Vienna, which Suleiman did not intend to face. According to historian Paolo Giovio, Charles arrived with an imperial army at Vienna on 23 September, too late to fight the Ottomans because Suleiman had already withdrawn. By their defense of Kőszeg, Nikola Jurišić and his men had saved Vienna from a siege. (Note: According to "A Historical Encyclopedia", the dogged defense of Kőszeg convinced Suleiman to give up on besieging Vienna, which was much more fortified.)

== Aftermath ==
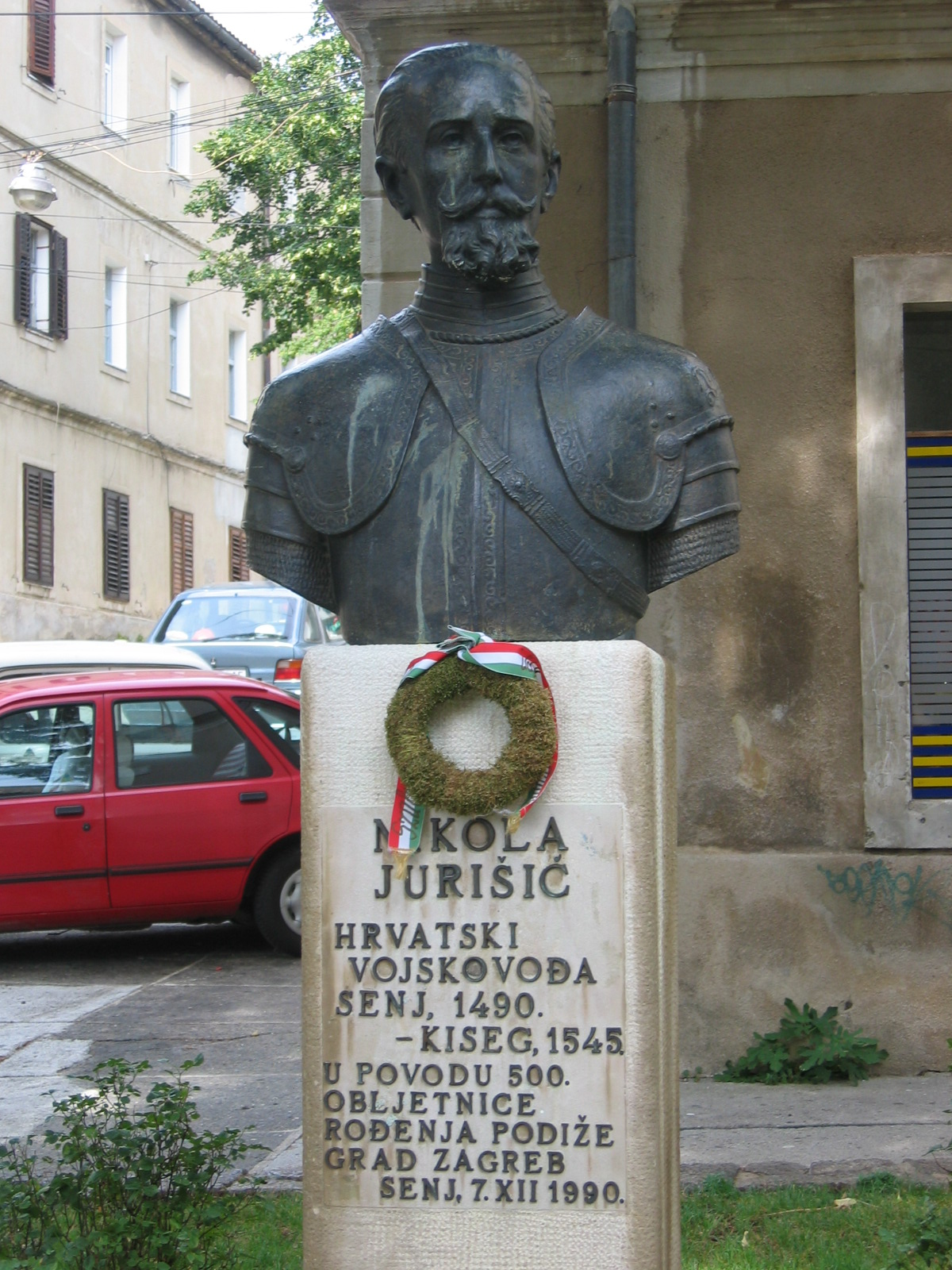
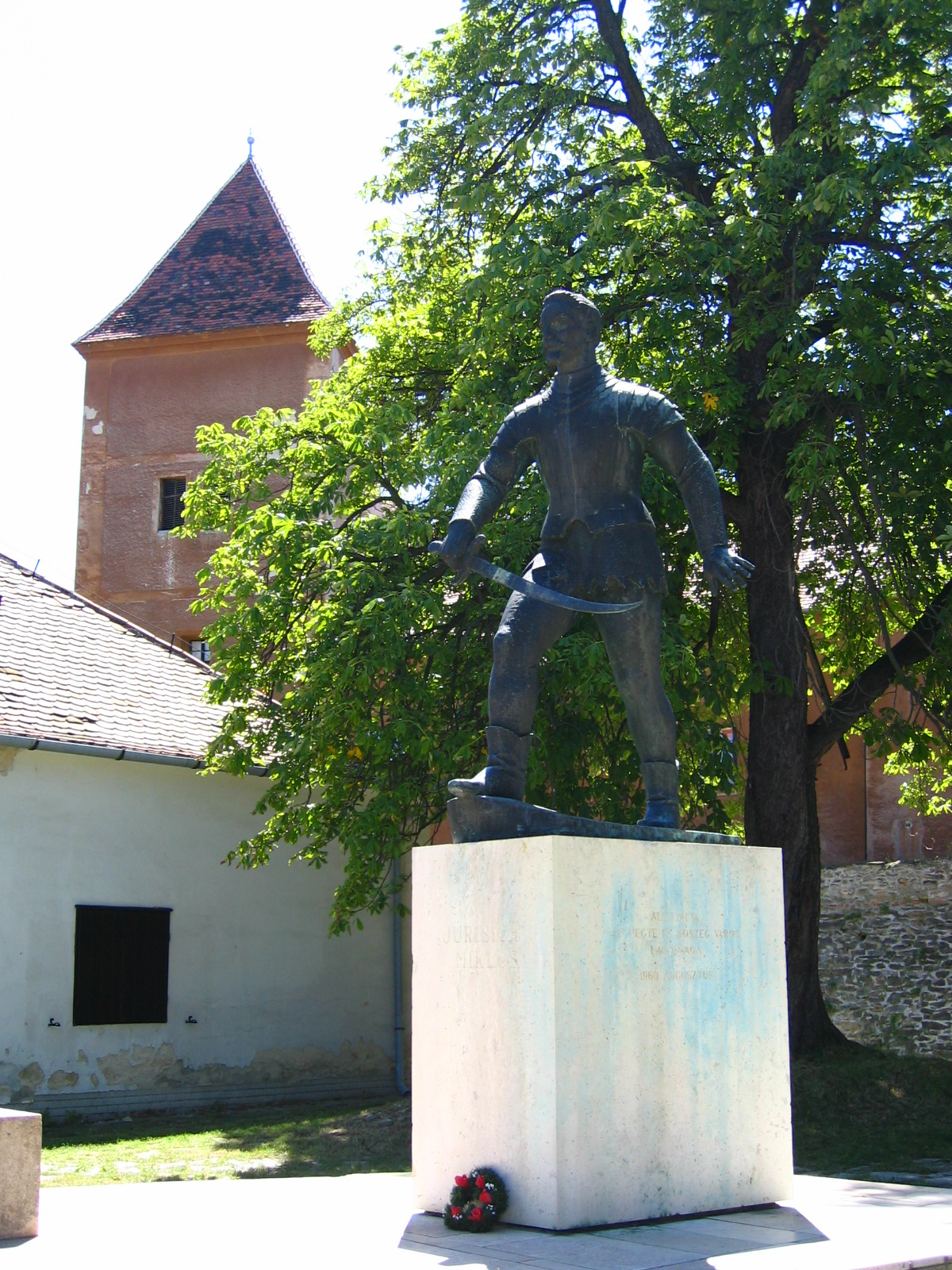
Statue of Nikola Jurišić in Senj, Croatia (left) and in Kőszeg, Hungary (right)

Although he was stopped at Kőszeg and failed to conquer Vienna, Suleiman additionally secured his possession in Hungary by conquering several forts, since Ferdinand and Charles evaded an open field battle. Immediately after the Ottoman withdrawal, Ferdinand reoccupied devastated territory in Austria and Hungary. Nevertheless, Suleiman concluded a peace treaty with Ferdinand in 1533, in Constantinople. The treaty confirmed the right of John Zápolya as a king of all Hungary, but recognised Ferdinand's possession of that part of the country that enjoyed the status quo. Also the Austrian archiduke was considered equal to the Ottoman Grand Vizier.

This treaty did not satisfy Zápolya or Ferdinand, whose armies began to skirmish along the borders. After Zápolya's death in 1540, Suleiman annexed Hungary to the Ottoman realm. Although from 1529 to 1566 the borders of the Ottoman Empire moved further west, none of the campaigns after 1529 achieved the decisive victory that would secure the new Ottoman possessions.
