= Sacred Heart Church (Kőszeg, Hungary) =

Church in Kőszeg, Hungary

Coordinates: 47°23′16″N 16°32′26″E

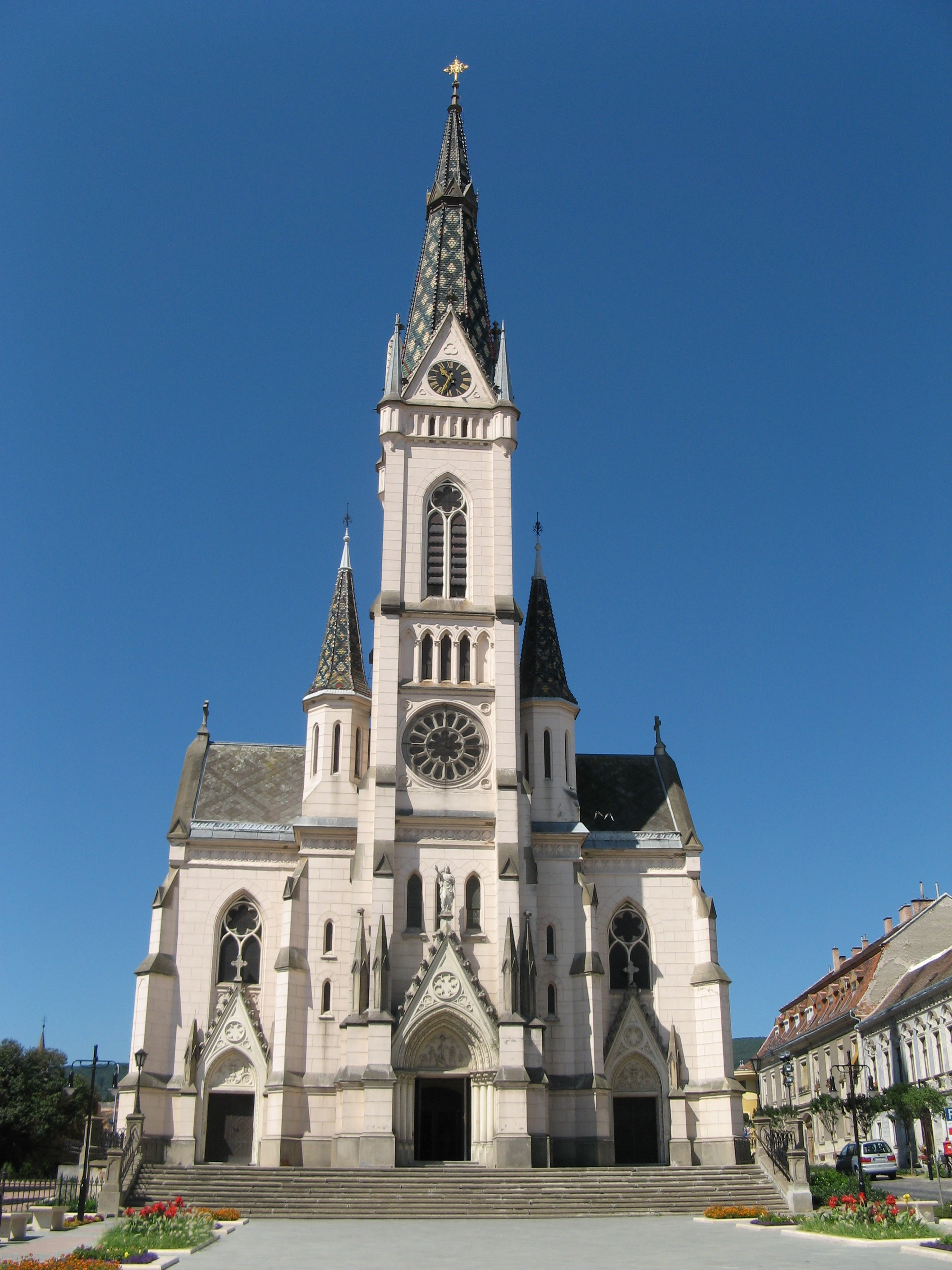
The church

The Church of Jesus’ Heart (Hungarian: Jézus Szíve templom) is a parish church in the historical centre of Kőszeg, Western Hungary. The building is considered to be a fine example of Gothic Revival architecture.

The church was designed by Viennese architect Ludwig Schöne and was built between 1892 and 1894 in place of the old Korona Hotel on the main square. It is a hall church with three naves, a transept and a polygonal sacrarium. It has a 57 metres high tower and two pinnacles. The bell plays a melody from Händel's oratorio Saul. The carved wooden altars were made in Vienna and in Tirol. Many of the stained glass windows were donated to the church by local families; they show pictures of Jesus, Mary, Joseph, and Hungarian saints such as St. Stephen, Blessed Gisella, St. Emeric, St. Ladislaus, St. Elizabeth and St. Margaret.

Several pieces of mediaeval and Baroque furniture and goldsmith's work were taken to this church from the older St. James church, including two chalices made in 1421 and 1486.

The organ was made in 1894 by the Rieger brothers.
