= Vatrogasci =

Croatian parody band

- Origin: Gajnice, Croatia
- Genres: Rock, pop/rock, parody music
- Years active: 1991–present
- Labels: Croatia Records, Euroton, eSVe, Kondorcomm, Zelex/Suzy, Unicorn Records
- Members: Tihomir Borošak – Tiho; Goran Borošak – Gugi; Mario Jurišić – Jura; Rudolf Katalinić-Rudi
- Past members: Mladen Martinović – Dugi; Vladimir Pavelić – Bubi; Dean Parmak - Deki; Nikola Budić – Beli
- Website: www.vatrogasnazabava.com

Vatrogasci (English: "Firefighters") is a Croatian parody rock band formed in 1991 by Tihomir Borošak (Tiho) and Dean Parmak. The Band is known in particular for humorous songs and their often parody specific songs of contemporary musical acts.

Their first song was "Vatrogasac Mirko" ("Firefighter Mirko") recorded during one hour break while they were waiting for a next client. After the recording session they needed a singer, so they found Vladimir Pavelić (Bubi). Dean Parmak was first to leave the band, and after four albums recorded Pavelić left too. After Vladimir Pavelić, next singer was Mladen Martinović (Dugi) who would be their singer for next 10 years; after him, for their new album new singer is Goran Borošak (Gugi).

Their last album was "Dvodojak" (2014).

== Famous parodies ==
They parodied many Croatian bands and singers, and also many foreign bands.

In 1992, the group made a parody of Boney M song "Rivers of Babylon", translating it into Croatian (naming it "Joj što volim") and making it in turbofolk arrangement. Group also covered 2 Unlimited's eurodance hit "No Limit", naming it "Nema ograničenja". Song "Paloma Blanca" was also covered in 1993 by the group (naming it "Pekara").

In 1993, they made a parody of ABBA's song "Chiquitita", translating it into Croatian (renaming it "Čičikita"). In 1994, the group featuring Croatian comedian Željko Pervan made a parody of Boney M "Rasputin" song, translating it into Croatian (naming "Raspiči, opiči"). They also made a parody of song "Those Were the Days" translating it into Croatian (naming it "Ajnc, cvaj draj").

In 1998, the group made a cover of "We Don't Need Another Hero (Thunderdome)" song in Gypsy life thematic, translating it into Croatian and naming it "Daj još jednu", giving it a tamburica/folk music arrangement. They also covered famous songs like:

- The Buggles song "Video Killed the Radio Star" in 1999.
- Queen song "Bohemian Rhapsody" in 2002.
- The Police song "Every Breath You Take" in 2005.
- Guns N' Roses song "Sweet Child o' Mine" in 2005.
- and many more.

== Discography ==
=== Studio albums ===
- "Vatrogasna zabava vol.1" (Euroton, 1992)
- "Vatrogasna zabava vol.2" (Euroton, 1993)
- "Vatrogasna zabava vol.3" (Euroton, 1994)
- "Vatrogasna zabava vol.4" (Croatia Records, 1995)
- "Priče iz radione" (Croatia Records, 1998)
- "Med i mlijeko" (Croatia Records, 1999)
- "Sreća u nesreći" (Croatia Records, 2001)
- "Kitice i revreni" (eSVe, 2002)
- "Trava i užas" (Kondorcomm/Song Zelex, 2003)
- "Poruke u boci" (Suzy/Song Zelex, 2004)
- "Vlahovin svjedok" (Unicorn Records, 2005)
- "Homo erectus" (their own, limited edition, 2009)
- "Badel 2013" (Unicorn Records, 2013)
- "Dvodojak" (Unicorn Records, 2014)

=== Compilation albums ===
- "The Best of" (Croatia Records, 1996)

== See also ==
- Music of Croatia
