= Battle of Buda =

There have been several Battles of Buda in history:

- Siege of Buda (1529)
- Siege of Buda (1530)
- Siege of Buda (1541), capture of the city of Buda by the Turkish Ottoman Emperor Suleiman the Magnificent, as he invaded central Hungary
- Siege of Pest (1542), an attempt to recapture Buda from the Turks
- Siege of Buda (1684), a battle when an Austrian army tried to take Buda from Ottoman Turkey
- Siege of Buda (1686), a battle when the Holy League took Buda from Ottoman Turkey
- Siege of Buda (1849), a battle during the Hungarian Revolution of 1848–49, the Hungarian army led by General Artúr Görgei captured Buda from the Austrian Imperial Army.
- Siege of Budapest (1944-1945), capture of Budapest by the Soviet Union
- Battles of Fort Budapest (1973)
