= Siege of Buda (1530) =

1530 failed attempt to capture Buda from the Ottomans

- Part of the Little War in Hungary; Habsburg–Ottoman war of 1529–1533
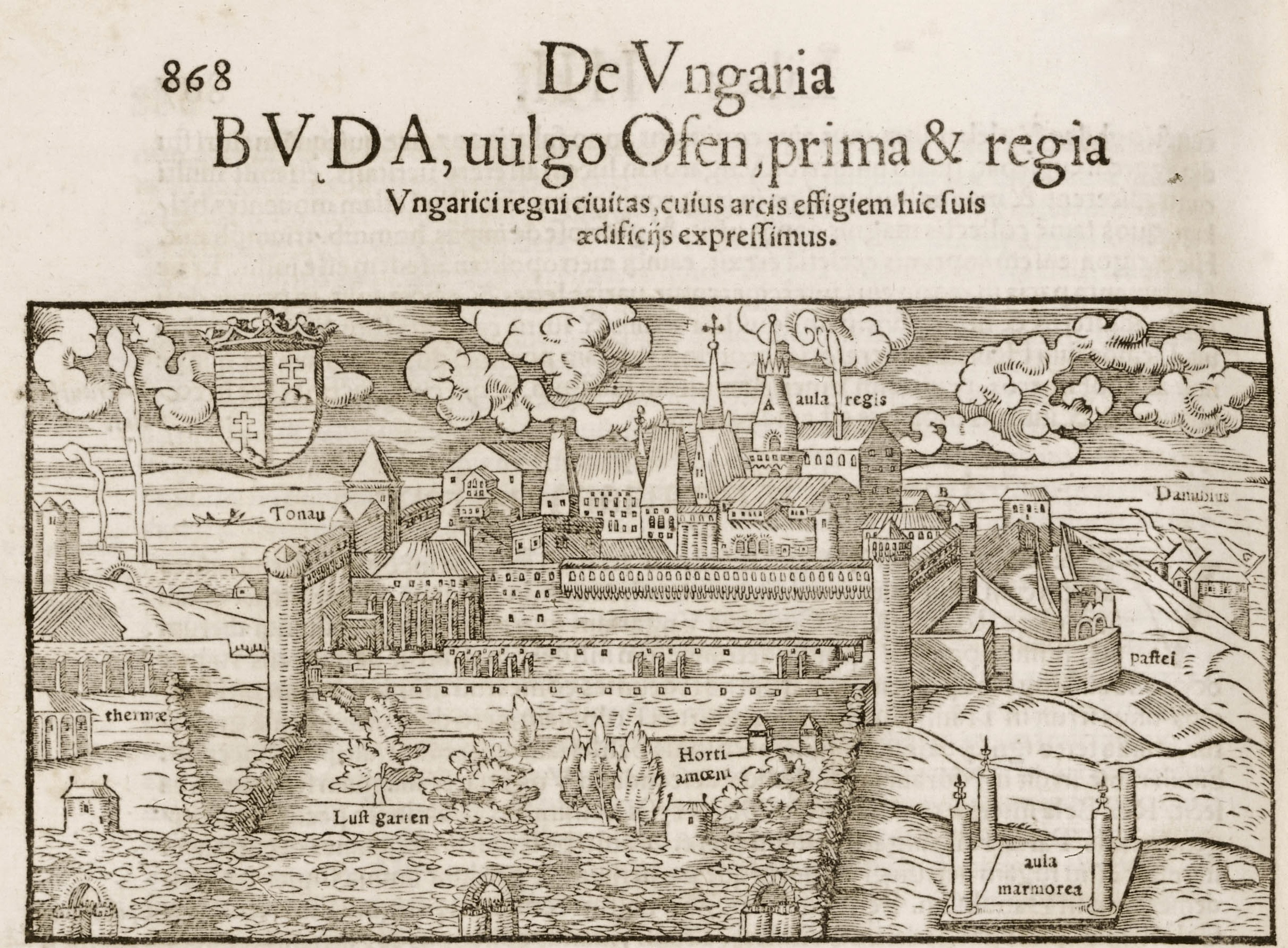
- Buda in 1530
Date	1530: Oct. 31 – Dec. 20
Location	Buda, Hungary
Result	Ottoman victory

Belligerents
Habsburg Empire	Ottoman Empire: John Szapolyai's Hungarian Kingdom

Commanders and leaders
Ferdinand I Wilhelm von Roggendorf	Suleiman the Magnificent; Lodovico Gritti

Strength
10,000 German, Austrian, Spanish, Czech and Hungarian soldiers	3,000 Turks; 800 Serbs and Turks

Casualties and losses
Unknown	Unknown

The siege of Buda in 1530 was a failed attempt to capture Buda from the Ottomans by Ferdinand I.

In 1529 Suleiman the Magnificent captured Buda and installed John Zápolya as his vassal. Because Zápolya was weak, to protect Buda, Suleiman left a garrison of 3,000 Ottoman soldiers under the command of Alvise (Ludovico) Gritti, who were later joined by 800 Serbs and Turks as the remainder of the Ottoman Army marched on and laid siege to the city of Vienna.

Ferdinand wanted to rule the entirety of the Kingdom of Hungary, as a result he attempted to occupy Buda which resulted in a siege that lasted from October 31 to December 20, in 1530.

The besiegers were hindered by the weather and by Gritti’s successful defence of the castle. Wilhelm von Roggendorf ordered an overall attack on 10 November. The siege was launched from three points, from the north-east, the east and from the Gellért Hill in the south-west. The attack from the south-west was initially successful, however the defenders cleverly mobilised the reserves they had set up and drove back the attackers. An advance of Ottoman relief troops was reported on 20 November, the Habsburg offensive was cancelled and the army set out back to Vienna on 22 November. It can be concluded that the attackers withdrew in panic as their sick and injured soldiers were captured by the men of John Zápolya who had them massacred.
