= Siege of Buda (1529) =

Capture of the city Buda by Ottoman forces in 1529

- Part of the Little War in Hungary; Habsburg–Ottoman war of 1529–1533
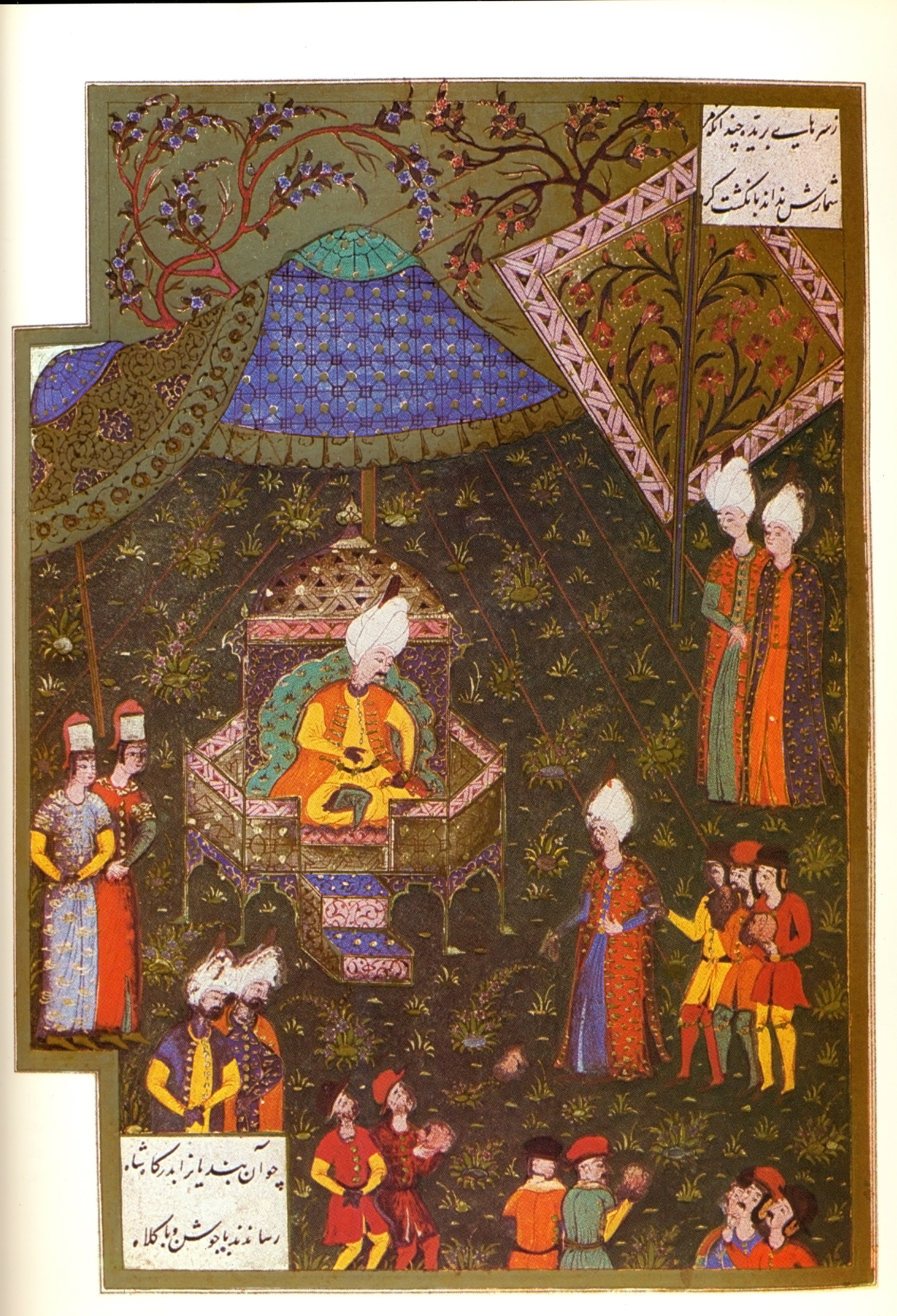
- Suleiman after the capture of Buda in 1529
Date	August 26 – September 8, 1529
Location	Buda, Hungary
Result	Ottoman victory: Ottomans capture Buda; John Sigismund Zápolya installed as vassal of Suleiman

Belligerents
Holy Roman Empire: Habsburg-held Hungary	Ottoman Empire: John Szapolyai's Hungarian Kingdom

Commanders and leaders
Ferdinand I	Suleiman the Magnificent

Strength
Unknown	Unknown

Casualties and losses
Unknown	Unknown

The siege of Buda was a military operation led by the Ottoman Empire with the aim of capturing Buda and installing John Zápolya as its ruler.

Ferdinand I was able to defeat John Zápolya in September 1527 and have himself crowned in November. Zápolya refused to give up his claims to the Hungarian throne and therefore appealed to Suleiman for recognition in return for tribute. Suleiman accepted Zápolya as his vassal in February and in May 1529 Suleiman personally embarked on his campaign.

On 26–27 August Suleiman had Buda encircled and the siege began. The walls were destroyed by intensive cannon and gun fire of the Ottoman artillery between 5 and 7 September. The military preparedness, uninterrupted attacks and physical and psychological destruction that was caused by the Ottoman artillery had the desired effect. The German mercenaries surrendered and ceded the castle to the Ottomans on 8 September. John Zápolya was installed in Buda as a vassal of Suleiman.

After the defeat of Ferdinand his supporters were promised safe passage from the town, however the Ottoman troops slaughtered them outside of the city walls. Following this victory, the Ottoman army led by Sultan Suleiman marched on and laid siege to the city of Vienna.
