= Motti Ashkenazi =

Israeli military captain

Motti Ashkenazi (Hebrew: מוטי אשכנזי; born 1940) was a reserve captain in the Israel Defense Forces (IDF), who spearheaded a protest after the Yom Kippur War that led to the resignation of Prime Minister Golda Meir's government.

Ashkenazi was the commander of Fort Budapest, an Israeli fortification on the Suez Canal, in the Battles of Fort Budapest. It was the only position along the Bar Lev Line that did not fall to the Egyptians. When the war was over, he organized protests outside the Prime Minister's office which gained widespread public support. The protest movement began as a one-man crusade. In February 1974, Ashkenazi stationed himself outside Meir's office in Jerusalem with a hand-drawn placard proclaiming: “Grandma, your defense minister is a failure and 3,000 of your children are dead.”

Underestimating the impact of Ashkenazi's actions, defense minister Moshe Dayan did not believe that demonstrations would bring down the government. Within three months, however, growing public pressure forced the government to resign and ultimately led to the fall from power of the Labor Party.
