= Wilhelm von Roggendorf =

Austrian general (1481–1541)

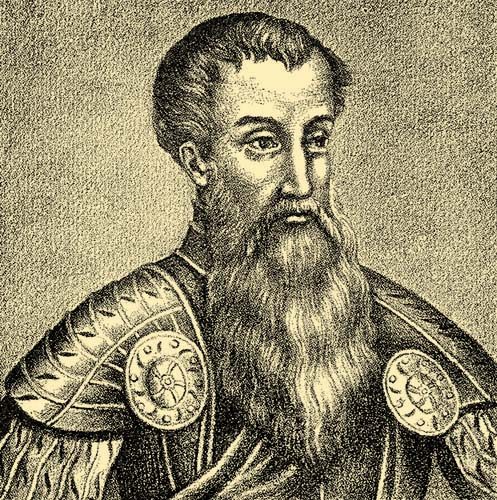
Wilhelm von Roggendorf

Wilhelm Freiherr von Roggendorf (1481 – 25 August 1541) was an Austrian military commander and Hofmeister.

He was a son of Kaspar von Roggendorf, and thus member of the ancient Von Roggendorf family from Styria, which ruled in Lower Austria since the middle of the 15th century.

Wilhelm von Roggendorf served the Habsburgs starting in 1491. He was Stadtholder of Friesland between 1517 and 1520, and was in the second half of the 1520s Hofmeister of Ferdinand I, Holy Roman Emperor. In the winter of 1523-1524 was the chief of the German infantry in the Spanish army which invaded the north of the Kingdom of Navarre and the Bearn. Later he took part in the recovering of the city-fortress of Hondarribia, conquered by the French admiral Bonnivet three years before. During the Siege of Vienna in 1529 by the Turks, he served as commander of the heavy cavalry under his brother-in-law Nicholas, Count of Salm (1459–1530). In the following years he had an influential role at the Austrian court as Obersthofmeister. He resigned in 1539, but returned as commander of the Austrian Siege of Buda, which ended in disaster. Von Roggendorf was wounded during this battle and died two days later of his wounds.

== Bibliography ==
- Alfred Kohler: Ferdinand I. 1503-1564 Fürst, König und Kaiser. C. H. Beck, München 2003, ISBN 3-406-50278-4
- Christian Brandstätter: Stadtchronik Wien. Christian Brandstätter Verlag, Wien/München 1986, ISBN 3-85447-229-3
