= Battles of Fort Budapest =

1973 battle of the Yom Kippur War

Coordinates: 31°10′31.0″N 32°26′45.7″E

First Battle of Fort Budapest
- Part of the Yom Kippur War
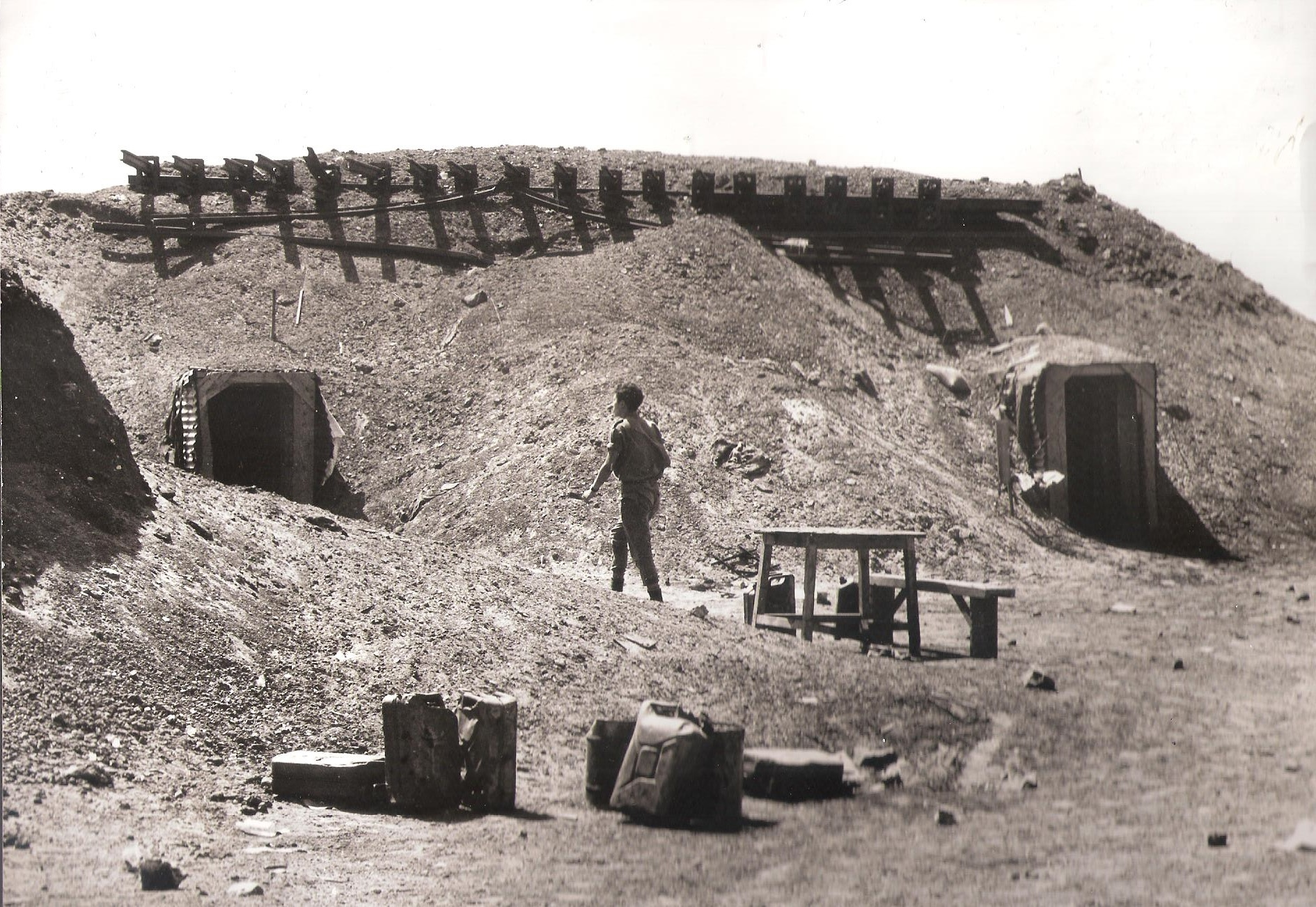
- Fort Budapest in 1970
Date	October 6, 1973
Location	Sinai, Egypt
Result	Israeli victory

Belligerents
Egypt	Israel

Commanders and leaders
Salah 'Abd el-Halim †; Ali al-Mezahi (POW)	Motti Ashkenazi

Strength
1 infantry battalion 1 commando company	1 infantry company 2 tank platoons Reinforcements

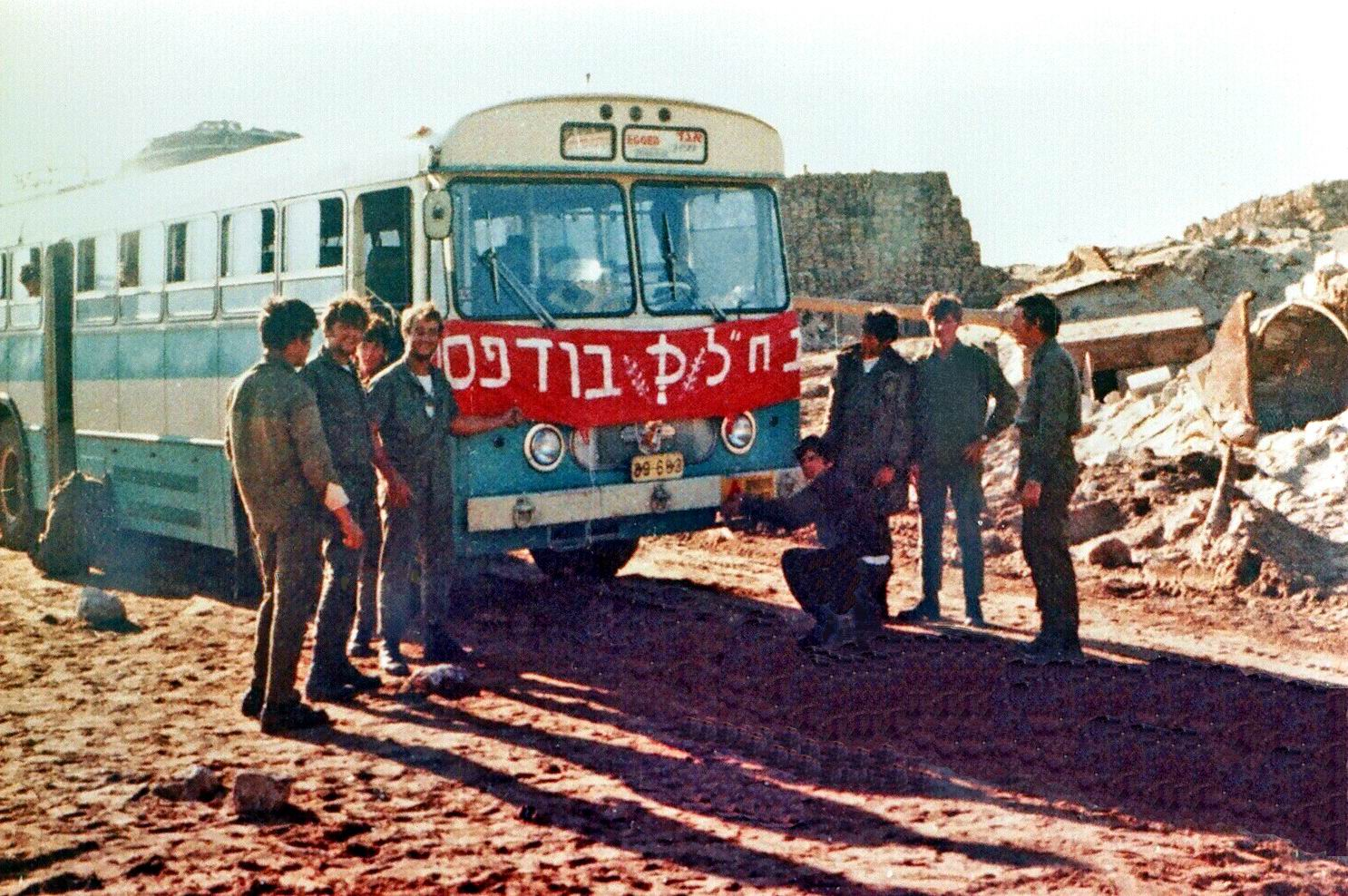
The ruined Fort Budapest in 1973

The Battles of Fort Budapest (Hebrew: מעוז בודפשט) refer to two attempts by the Egyptian Army to capture Fort Budapest, part of Israel's Bar Lev Line, during the Yom Kippur War. The first attempt took place at noon on October 6, 1973, with the start of Operation Badr, but failed due to Israeli Air Force intervention. The second attempt took place on October 15, at the onset of Operation Stouthearted Men, the Israeli military operation to cross the Suez Canal. Despite significant setbacks caused by poor sea conditions, the second attack was on the verge of success when the Israeli Air Force once again intervened, and this, coupled with Israeli reinforcements, repelled the Egyptian attack.

== Background ==
Fort Budapest was the northernmost fort of the Bar Lev Line, an elaborate chain of fortifications built by the Israeli army along the eastern bank of the Suez Canal. Unlike all other Bar Lev Line fortifications, Budapest was not located on or immediately east of the Suez Canal. Rather, it was located on the Mediterranean Sea, 16.5 kilometres (10.3 mi) south-east of Port Fouad. Fort Budapest was the strongest of all the Bar Lev positions due to its strategic location; the fort had control over the coastal road connecting Port Fouad to el-Arish to the east. The fort had exceptional engineering preparations and a considerable amount of weaponry. The fort incorporated nine bunkers, and was surrounded by barbed wire and minefields to a depth of 600 metres (660 yd). On October 6, the fort was garrisoned by an infantry company and two tank platoons, under the command of Captain Motti Ashkenazi.

The Budapest garrison also had the advantage of terrain. Located on a narrow strip of land bounded to the north by the Mediterranean, and to the south by salt marshes, the main route of approach for an attacker was by land over the strip, which spanned 170 metres (190 yd) at its widest. Alternatively, the fort could be attacked via the salt marshes, or by a naval landing. However the marshes could only be traversed on foot and then only very slowly, while a naval landing was subject to sea conditions.

=== Prelude to first attack ===
Capturing Fort Budapest fell within the responsibility of the Port Said Sector, an Egyptian military command independent of the Second Field Army to the south. The commander of the sector, Major General Omar Khalid, assigned the task of capturing the fort to the 135th Independent Infantry Brigade, commanded by Brigadier General Salah 'Abd el-Halim. The 135th was also tasked with capturing another position, Fort Orkal, so Salah committed one battalion under the command of Lieutenant Colonel Ali al-Mezahi to capture Budapest. However, Salah had the following reinforcements: six obsolete T-34 tanks equipped with mine flails to breach the Israeli minefield, eight amphibious armored vehicles, a 120 mm mortar company, and a company of the 128th Sa'iqa Group (Sa'iqa, meaning lightning, were Egyptian commando forces). The Sa'iqa company would join the attack via a naval landing and would be separated into two groups. One group would land four kilometers east of Budapest to isolate it and prevent Israeli reinforcements from reaching the fort. The other group would land one kilometer east of Budapest, and then attack the fort. The main assault would come from the west, to be carried out by the battalion and the six tanks. The battalion would attack from Port Fouad, the only part of the Sinai under Egyptian control.

To allow the Sa'iqa company to perform its landing, the Port Said Sector was to be supplied 24 assault dinghies. Only ten were received however, and on October 3, Second Army informed Khalid that there were no more dinghies available, and that he would have to improvise. Khalid resorted to renting two fishing boats. Consequently, the Sa'iqa company was tasked with simply isolating the fort; no attack from the east would be carried out.

== First battle ==
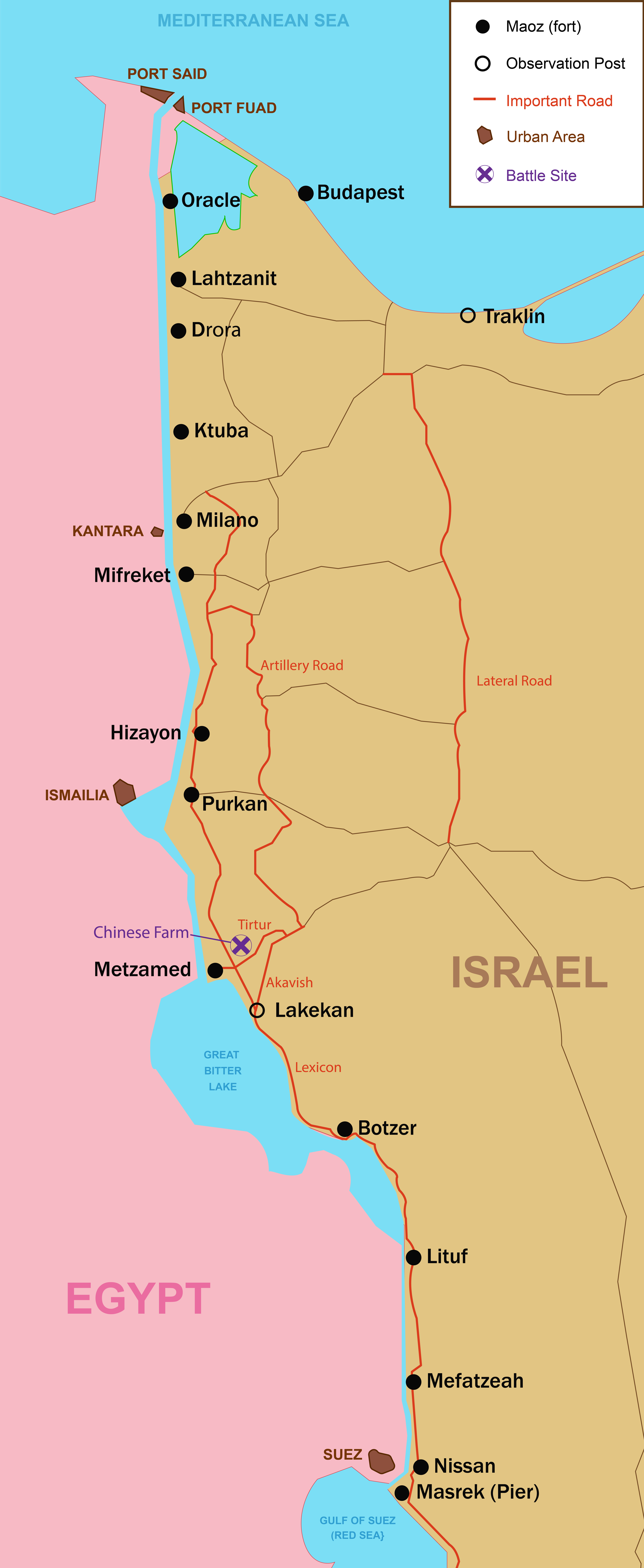
Bar-Lev Line. Fort Budapest can be seen at the northern part of the line, east of the other forts

On October 6, at 14:00, as part of Operation Badr, over 200 Egyptian aircraft participated in an air strike against various Israeli targets in the Sinai. As part of the strike, IL-28 tactical bombers attacked Fort Budapest. The bombers were moderately accurate, some of the bombs finding their targets and others landing outside the fort's perimeter. Budapest was also targeted by an artillery barrage, beginning at 14:05. While the fire preparation was underway, the Sa'iqa company moved out of Port Said to conduct its landing east of the fort. At the same time the main attacking force began moving from its positions east of Port Fouad. In the lead were three T-34s with mine flails to breach the minefield, closely followed by combat engineers, and then the advance fireteams. Behind these, forming the first echelon of the battalion, was a platoon in amphibious vehicles supported by the three remaining T-34s.

As soon as the lead T-34s reached the minefield, they came under heavy fire from the fort's garrison. Soon all three tanks were either destroyed or damaged, so the combat engineers proceeded to breach the minefield on their own. Israeli aircraft began strafing and bombing the Egyptian forces for over two and a half hours while encountering no resistance, leading to the destruction of all six tanks and five vehicles. The Israelis bombed Egyptian forces at the minefield and on an area of the strip stretching two kilometers towards Port Fouad. Under fire from the air and from the fort, the attack bogged down to a complete halt before the Egyptians began to retreat. Salah ordered his battalion to assume defensive positions east of Port Fouad to repel any Israeli counterattack and to regroup.

The Sa'iqa company achieved the only discernible success of the attack. It managed to land four kilometers east of the fort without facing any aerial resistance (as the company was sailing in civilian fishing boats). The company managed to prevent Israeli reinforcements from reaching the fort, destroying a number of tanks and vehicles. It also captured six Israeli soldiers.

Salah planned to attempt another attack against Budapest on October 8, and al-Mezahi, whose battalion would carry out the second attempt, took the necessary preparations. The attack was canceled however, due to heavy Israeli aerial attacks against Port Said throughout the night of October 7/8. The Sa'iqa company continued to hold its positions east of Budapest for four days, until Salah decided to withdraw it due to the casualties it had sustained.

== Second battle ==
=== Prelude ===
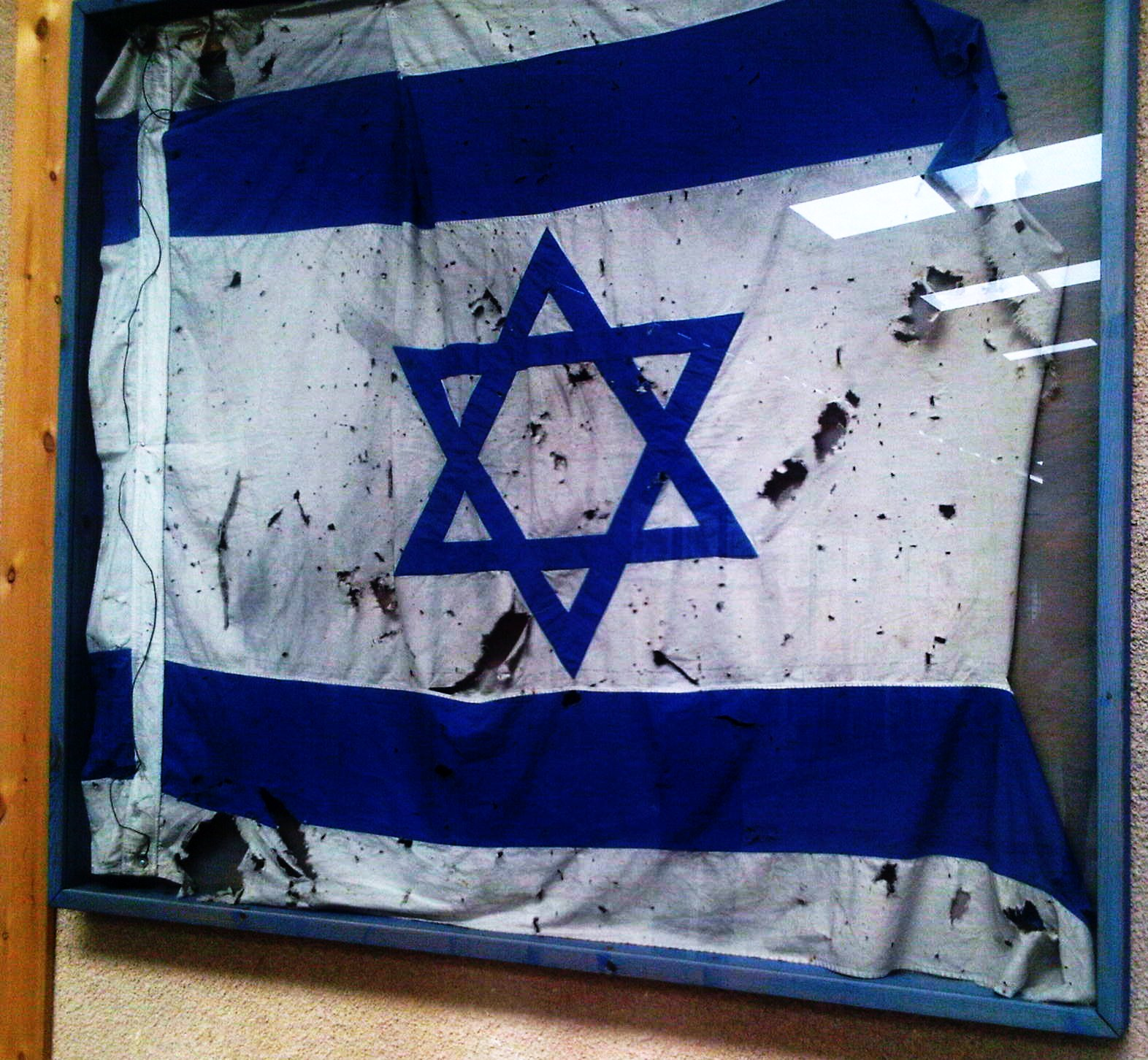
Israeli flag flown at Fort Budapest throughout the war, currently preserved in the Israeli Armored Corps memorial at Latrun

On October 11, the Port Said Sector was reinforced with the 103rd Sa'iqa battalion of the 139th Sa'iqa Group. The battalion had arrived from Cairo, and three days later the sector received ten new fiberglass boats from Alexandria. The boats however had been sent without necessary maintenance of the boats themselves or their engines. With the arrival of these reinforcements and equipment, Salah began to lay a plan of attack.

As in the first attempt, a Sa'iqa company from the 103rd Battalion would occupy positions four kilometers east of Budapest to isolate the fort. It would be supported by an AT-3 Sagger ATGM platoon. The main attack would be launched from the east by a Sa'iqa company and a company from al-Mezahi's battalion as the first echelon. Other units of al-Mezahi's battalion would conduct a secondary attack from the west, while one company remained in reserve near Port Fouad along with a Sa'iqa company. A reinforced company (less one platoon) of al-Mezahi's battalion would land by sea directly upon the Israeli fort. The attack would be preceded by a 30-minute-long fire preparation.

Salah presented his plan to Maj. Gen. Khalid on the morning of October 13. Khalid authorized the attack and informed Second Army. The 103rd Sa'iqa Battalion spent the night of October 12/13 and October 14 preparing for the attack; reconnoitering the area around the fort by means of patrol groups and aerial photographs, as well as studying routes of approach through the marshes. The attacking forces began moving to their positions at 19:00 on October 14, taking advantage of the darkness. The secondary attack force took up position east of Port Fouad while the main force reached its position east of the fort through the marshes in four waves. The marsh was extremely difficult to cross due to the nature of the terrain and the high concentration of salt, which meant the soldiers had to traverse the marshes barefoot. Towards midnight, the Egyptians began harassing the fort's garrison with artillery fire using a range of calibers, along with Katyusha rockets launched from a naval vessel.

=== Attack ===
Second Battle of Fort Budapest
- Part of the Yom Kippur War
Date	October 15, 1973
Location	Sinai, Egypt
Result	Israeli victory

Belligerents
Egypt	Israel

Commanders and leaders
Salah 'Abd el-Halim; Ali al-Mezahi (KIA)	Motti Ashkenazi

Strength
1 infantry battalion 2 Sa'iqa companies	1 infantry company 2 tank platoon Reinforcements: 2 tank companies

Casualties and losses
1 Sukhoi Su-7 destroyed	20 tanks and half-tracks destroyed

At 3:00 AM on October 15, the reinforced company (less one platoon) began moving out of Port Said in preparation for its landing. At 3:30, the fire preparation began against the fort. It was carried out by the 135th Brigade's artillery and an additional artillery battalion. At 4:00, the attack began. The secondary attack force approaching from the west opened fire to draw the garrison's attention. The main force advanced towards the fort, spearheaded by the Sa'iqa company. The Egyptians managed to reach the fort and surprise its garrison. Soon the company was on the verge of entering the fort. The naval force however, due to bad sea conditions (sea state 4) arrived at 4:30, half an hour late, and then was forced to land one kilometer west of the fort. It joined the secondary attack group in its advance against the fortification. The mixed force came under heavy fire, and the battalion commander, Ali al-Mezahi was killed. The Sa'iqa company east of the fort finally succeeded in breaching the fort's defenses under heavy fire; the company commander was hit several times but continued to lead his men. The secondary force also managed to reach the fort's northern sand embankment. The fighting became intense, and the Egyptians picked up a radio signal sent by the garrison commander in which he detailed his men's precarious position and requested immediate assistance, especially air support. Despite the initial success achieved, Salah did not have his reserves on either side of the fort join the attack. With sunrise, Israeli aircraft began attacking Egyptian troops. Two F-4 Phantoms strafed the secondary force and made several bombing runs against it, while helicopters attacked the main force.

The Israelis reinforced the fort with two tank companies. They came up against the Sa'iqa company isolating the fort. In the ensuing firefight, the company leader and every platoon commander were killed as the Egyptians were caught in open ground, bereft of any cover. There were also many casualties, but the Sa'iqa destroyed twenty Israeli tanks and half-tracks during the battle.

The Egyptians, under heavy and effective fire from the Israelis inside the bunkers, ceased entering the fort. The Sa'iqa company to the east, under concentrated Israeli tank fire and aerial bombardment, was finally overwhelmed by the Israeli reinforcements, which proceeded towards the fort, opening fire on the main force. Consequently, all Egyptian forces east of the fort attempted to retreat through the marshes. The Israelis attempted to hamper the retreat by dropping smoke capsules over the area from four A-4 Skyhawks. The lack of visibility caused injuries as men tripped and were trampled during the retreat through the marshes.

The sector's command contacted Saad El Shazly, the Egyptian Chief of Staff, and informed him of the failure of the attack, and requested that paratroopers – who were supposedly promised in support of the attack but never arrived – be sent to protect the retreating forces. Artillery fire was used to provide cover. Khalid instructed Salah to have his forces retreat to their original defensive positions east of Port Fouad to reorganize, and to defend against counterattacks at all costs. Throughout October 15, troops that had retreated through the lake continued to arrive at the defensive positions, where Israeli counterattacks were repulsed with the help of artillery. At 8:00 that morning, two Egyptian Sukhoi Su-7 fighter-bombers flew over the battlefield. On arriving over the fort, one was shot down by ground fire, and the other withdrew.

== Aftermath ==
The second Egyptian attempt was the last; the Port Said Sector did not launch another attack to capture the fort. Thus Budapest remained the only Israeli fortification of the Bar Lev Line to remain under Israeli control. Four months after the Yom Kippur War, Captain Motti Ashkenazi, the commander of Fort Budapest, led the protests against the Israeli government's handling of the war.
