= Nicholas, Count of Salm =

Imperial military commander

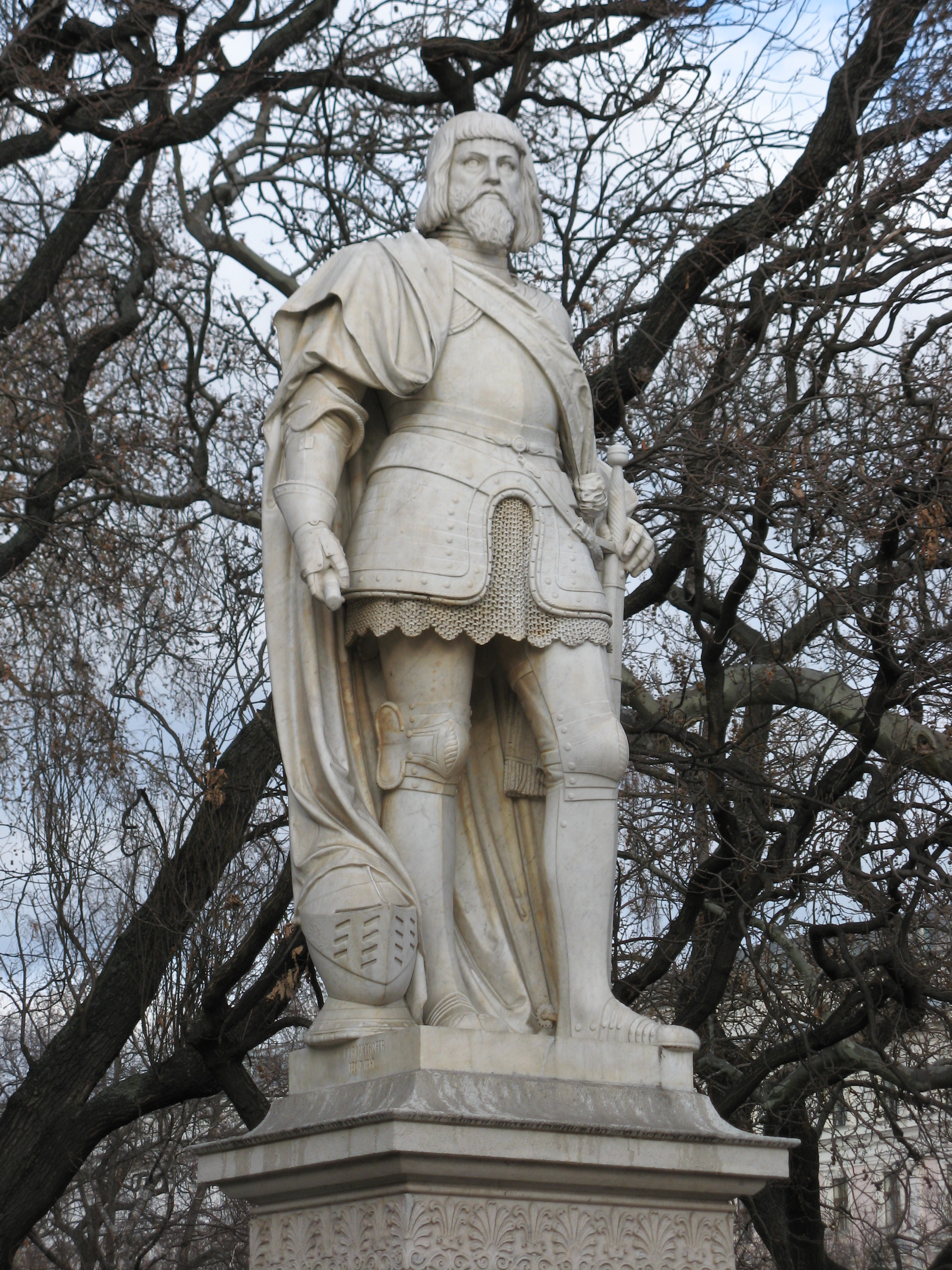
Statue in the plaza of the Rathaus, Vienna, Mathias Purkartshofer, sculptor, 1867

Nicholas, Count of Salm (1459 – Salmhof, Marchegg, Lower Austria, 4 May 1530) was a German soldier and an Imperial senior military commander (German: Feldherr). His greatest achievement was the defence of Vienna during the first siege by the Ottoman Empire in 1529.

== Life ==
At the age of 17 in 1476, Nicholas participated in the Battle of Morat against Charles the Bold. In 1488, he fought in Flanders and was made an Imperial Colonel three years later. In 1509, he fought in Italy under Georg von Frundsberg and conquered Istria.

In 1502, he married Elisabeth von Rogendorff; they had several children, including:

- Nicholas II, count of Salm-Neuburg
- Wolfgang of Salm, Bishop of Passau

In the Battle of Pavia in 1525 Nicholas of Salm played an important role in taking King Francis I of France prisoner. The following year he crushed the Peasants' Revolt in Tirol and conquered Schladming.

In 1529 aged 70, he was asked to organise the defense of Vienna during the first siege by the Turks, which he did with great skill and success. During the siege, he was wounded by a falling rock, and died a few months later from his wounds.

== Honours ==
He was made a Knight in the Order of the Golden Fleece.

His tomb sculpture, made by Loy Hering, can still be seen in the Votive Church in Vienna.

== In popular culture ==
Salm is the central figure in the modern German author Wolfgang Hohlbein's novel Die Wiederkehr.

Salm figures in The Shadow of the Vulture, by Robert E. Howard, where he is acquainted with, and still has respect for, fallen knight von Kalmbach.

As "Von Salm", he figures as a supporting character in the Tim Powers novel The Drawing of the Dark.
