= Siege of Vienna (1529) =

Siege of City by Suleiman I

Coordinates: 48.2083°N 16.3731°E

- Part of the Habsburg–Ottoman wars in Hungary (1526–1568); Habsburg–Ottoman war of 1529–1533
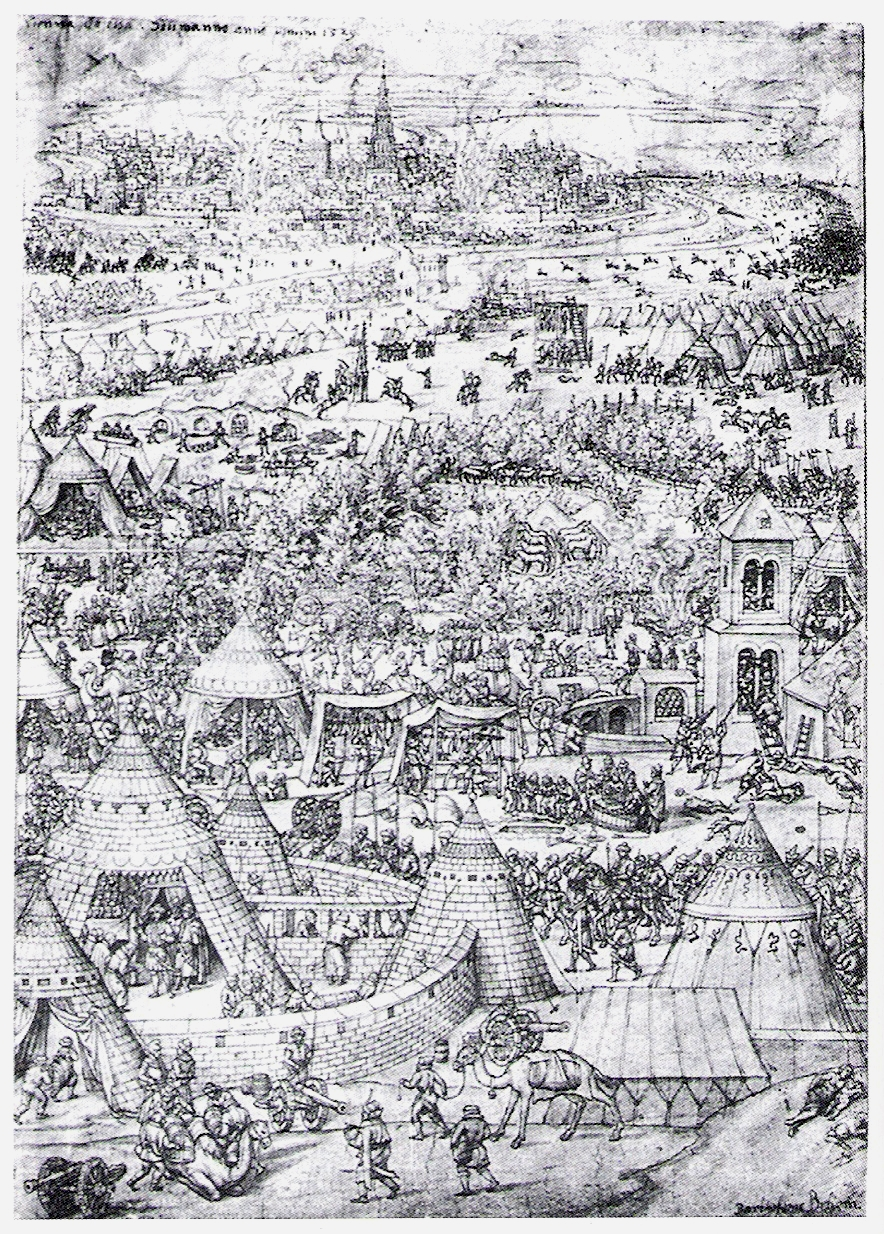
- Contemporary 1529 engraving of clashes between the Austrians and Ottomans outside Vienna, by Bartel Beham
Date	27 September – 15 October 1529 (2 weeks and 4 days)
Location	Vienna, Holy Roman Empire (present-day Austria)
Result	Habsburg victory

Belligerents
Holy Roman Empire: Kingdom of Bohemia; Electorate of the Palatinate; Duchy of Carniola; Spanish Empire	Ottoman Empire: (Moldavia) Moldavia (Vassal state)

Commanders and leaders
(Holy Roman Empire) Niklas Graf Salm (DOW); Philipp der Streitbare (Holy Roman Empire) Wilhelm von Roggendorf; Johann Katzianer (Holy Roman Empire) Pavle Bakić	(Ottoman Empire) Suleiman the Magnificent (Ottoman Empire) Pargalı Ibrahim Pasha

Strength
≈ 17,000–21,000 (Note: Turnbull says the garrison was "over 16,000 strong". Keegan and Wheatcroft suggest 17,000. Some estimates are just above 20,000, for example: "Together with Wilhelm von Roggendorf, the Marshal of Austria, Salm conducted the defense of Vienna with 16,000 regulars and 5,000 militia.")	≈ 75,000–100,000 combatants (out of 120,000–125,000 total campaign force) (Note: Turnbull suggests Suleiman had "perhaps 120,000" troops when he reached Osijek on 6 August. Christopher Duffy suggests "Suleiman led an army of 125,000 Turks". Modern consensus estimates 75,000 to 100,000 were active combatants at the walls due to losses on the march and rear garrisons. For higher estimates, see further note on Suleiman's troops.)

Casualties and losses
Unknown, with presumably high civilian fatalities and at least 20,000 civilians enslaved More than 1,500 dead (>10% of the garrison)	15,000 wounded, dead or captured

The 1529 siege of Vienna was the first attempt by the Ottoman Empire to capture the city of Vienna in the Archduchy of Austria, part of the Holy Roman Empire. Suleiman the Magnificent, sultan of the Ottomans, attacked the city with over 100,000 men, while the defenders, led by Niklas Graf Salm, numbered no more than 21,000. Nevertheless, Vienna was able to survive the siege. The siege ultimately lasted just over two weeks, from 27 September to 15 October 1529.

The siege came in the aftermath of the 1526 Battle of Mohács, which had resulted in the death of Louis II, King of Hungary and the descent of the kingdom into civil war. Following Louis' death, rival factions within Hungary selected two successors: Archduke Ferdinand I of Austria, supported by the House of Habsburg, and John Zápolya. Zápolya would eventually seek aid from, and become a vassal of the Ottoman Empire, after Ferdinand began to take control of western Hungary, including the city of Buda.

The Ottoman attack on Vienna was part of the empire's intervention into the Hungarian conflict. In the short term, the Ottomans sought to secure Zápolya's position. Historians offer conflicting interpretations of the Ottomans' long-term goals, including the motivations behind the choice of Vienna as the campaign's immediate target. Some modern historians suggest that Suleiman's primary objective was to assert Ottoman control over all of Hungary, including the western part (known as Royal Hungary) that was then still under Habsburg control. Some scholars suggest Suleiman intended to use Hungary as a staging ground for further invasion of Europe. (Note: It was an "afterthought towards the end of a season of campaigning". "A last-minute decision following a quick victory in Hungary". Other historians, including Stephen Turnbull, regard the suppression of Hungary as the calculated prologue, to an invasion further into Europe: "John Szapolya [sic] became a footnote in the next great Turkish advance against Europe in the most ambitious campaign of the great Sultan's reign.")

The failure of the siege of Vienna marked the beginning of 150 years of bitter military tension between the Habsburgs and Ottomans, punctuated by reciprocal attacks and culminating in a second siege of Vienna in 1683, which eventually led to the Great Turkish War.

== Background ==
In August 1526, Sultan Suleiman I decisively defeated the forces of King Louis II of Hungary at the Battle of Mohács, paving the way for the Ottomans to gain control of south-eastern Hungary; the childless King Louis died, possibly drowning when he attempted to escape the battlefield. His brother-in-law, Archduke Ferdinand I of Austria, brother of Holy Roman Emperor Charles V, claimed the vacant Hungarian throne. Ferdinand won recognition only in western Hungary; a noble called John Zápolya, from a power-base in Transylvania, challenged him for the crown and was recognised as king by Suleiman in return for accepting vassal status within the Ottoman Empire. Thus Hungary became divided into three zones: Royal Hungary, Ottoman Hungary and the Principality of Transylvania, an arrangement which persisted until 1700.

Following the Diet of Pozsony (modern Bratislava) on 26 October, Ferdinand was declared king of Royal Hungary due to the agreement between his and Louis's families, cemented by Ferdinand's marriage to Louis's sister Anna and Louis's marriage to Ferdinand's sister Mary. Ferdinand set out to enforce his claim on Hungary and captured Buda in 1527, only to relinquish his hold on it in 1529 when an Ottoman counter-attack stripped Ferdinand of all his territorial gains.

== Prelude ==
=== Ottoman army ===
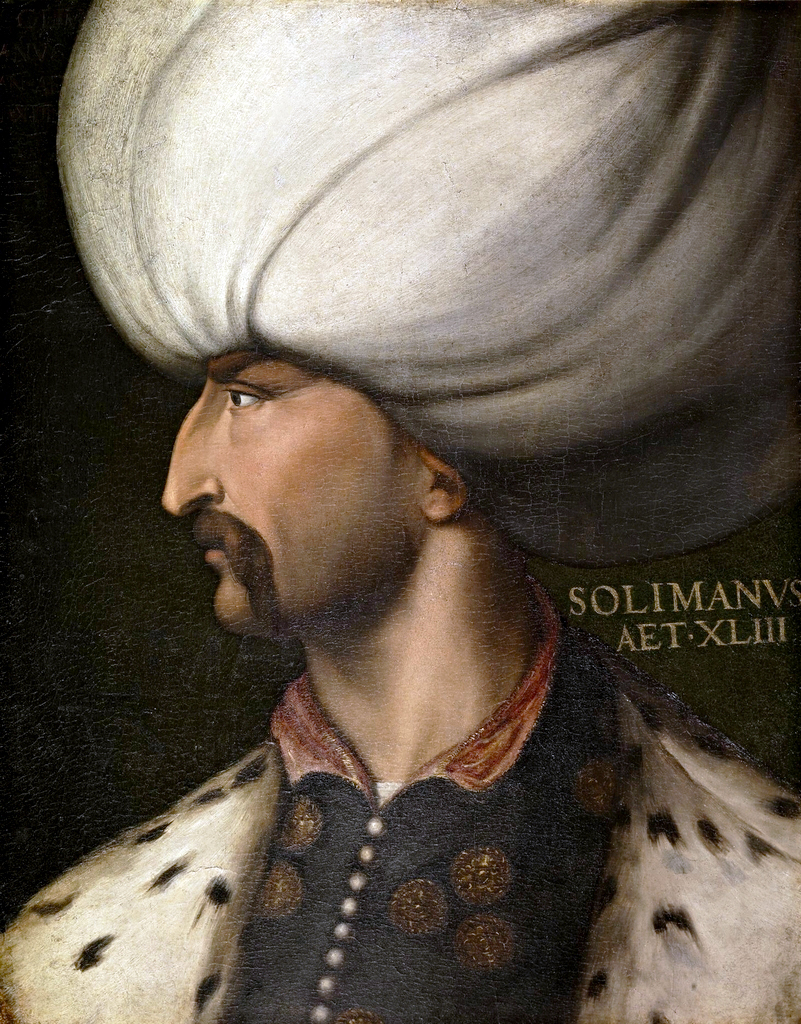
Portrait of Suleiman the Magnificent by Cristofano dell'Altissimo

In the spring of 1529, Suleiman mustered a large army in Ottoman Bulgaria, with the aim of securing control over all of Hungary at his new borders by Ferdinand I and the Holy Roman Empire. While contemporary 16th-century chroniclers and older histories frequently cited exaggerated figures ranging from 120,000 to over 300,000 men, modern historical consensus estimates Suleiman's actual combat force at the walls of Vienna to have been between 75,000 and 100,000 men, with the remainder consisting of logistics, baggage trains, and rear garrisons. (Note: Turnbull suggests Suleiman had "perhaps 120,000" troops when he reached Osijek on 6 August. Very high figures appear in nineteenth-century histories, for example that of Augusta Theodosia Drane in 1858, "more than 300,000 men"; such estimates may derive from contemporary accounts: the Venetian diarist Marino Sanuto, on 29 October 1529, for example, recorded the Turkish army as containing 305,200 men (mentioned in Lyber 1913, p. 107.). Modern books sometimes repeat the higher figures—for example, Daniel Chirot, in The Origins of Backwardness in Eastern Europe, 1980, p. 183, says "some 300,000 men besieged Vienna in 1529"; an alternative figure appears in Islam at War: "The sultan's army of 250,000 appeared before the gates of Vienna in the first siege of that great city".) As well as numerous units of Sipahi, the elite mounted force of the Ottoman cavalry, and thousands of janissaries, the Ottoman army incorporated a contingent from Moldavia and renegade Serbian warriors from the army of John Zápolya. Suleiman acted as the commander-in-chief (as well as personally leading his force), and in April he appointed his Grand Vizier (the highest Ottoman minister), a Greek former slave called Ibrahim Pasha, as Serasker, a commander with powers to give orders in the sultan's name. (Note: In April, the diploma by which Suleiman confirmed Ibrahim Pasha's appointment as serasker included the following: "Whatever he says and in whatever manner he decides to regard things, you are to accept them as if they were the propitious words and respect-commanding decrees issuing from my own pearl-dispensing tongue." Quoted by Murphey 1999, p. 136.)

Suleiman launched his campaign on 10 May 1529 and faced numerous obstacles from the onset. The spring rains that are characteristic of south-eastern Europe and the Balkans were particularly heavy that year, causing flooding in Bulgaria and rendering parts of the route used by the army barely passable. Many large-calibre cannons and artillery pieces became hopelessly mired or bogged down, leaving Suleiman no choice but to abandon them, while camels brought from the empire's Eastern provinces, not used to the difficult conditions, were lost in large numbers. Sickness and poor health became common among the janissaries, claiming many lives along the perilous journey.

Suleiman arrived in Osijek on 6 August. On the 18th he reached the Mohács plain, to be greeted by a substantial cavalry force led by John Zápolya (which would later accompany Suleiman to Vienna), who paid him homage and helped him recapture several fortresses lost since the Battle of Mohács to the Austrians, including Buda, which fell on 8 September. The only resistance came at Pozsony, where the Turkish fleet was bombarded as it sailed up the Danube.

=== Defensive measures ===
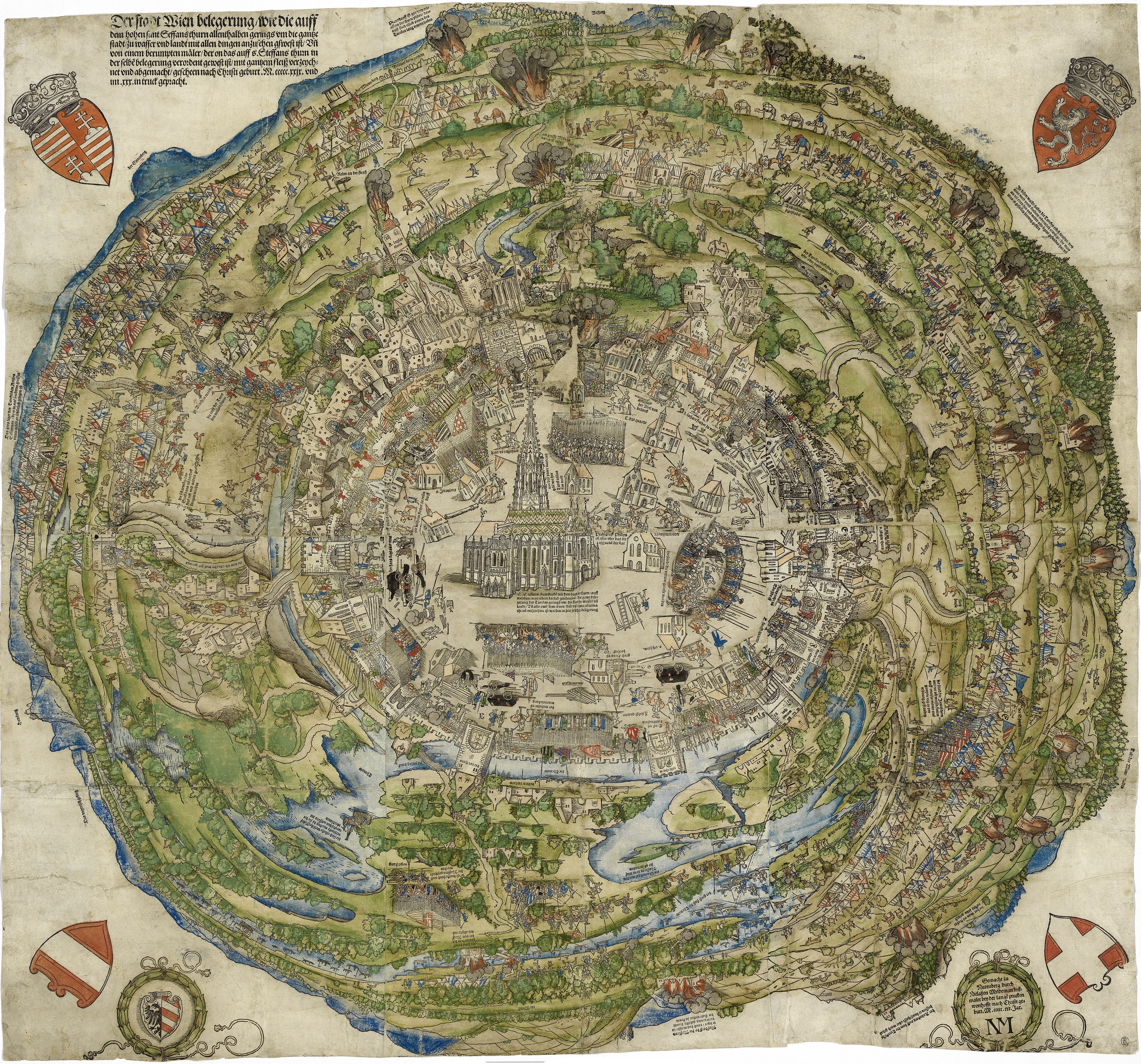
Panoramic view of Vienna during the first Turkish siege, by Nikolaus Meldemann, 1530, Wien Museum

As the Ottomans advanced towards Vienna, the city's population organised an ad-hoc resistance formed from local farmers, peasants, and civilians determined to repel the inevitable attack. The defenders were supported by a variety of European mercenaries, namely German Landsknecht pikemen and professional Spanish harquebusiers, sent by Charles V, who was Holy Roman Emperor and King of Spain. (Note: Ferdinand I had withdrawn to the safety of Habsburg Bohemia following pleas for assistance to his brother, Emperor Charles V, who was too stretched by his war with France to spare more than a few Spanish infantry to the cause.)

Queen Mary of Hungary, who was the sister of Charles V, in addition to 1,000 German Landsknechts under Count Niklas Salm, sent a contingent of 700–800 Spanish harquebusiers. Only 250 Spanish survived.

The Spanish were under the command of Marshal Luis de Ávalos, with captains Juan de Salinas, Jaime García de Guzmán, Jorge Manrique, and Cristóbal de Aranda. This elite infantry excelled in the defense of the northern area and with discretion fire prevented the Ottomans from settling in the Danube meadows, near the ramparts, where they could have breached with enough space to work. These elite soldiers also built additional palisades and trap pits that would be essential during the siege.

The Hofmeister of Austria, Wilhelm von Roggendorf, assumed charge of the defensive garrison, with operational command entrusted to a seventy-year-old German mercenary named Nicholas, Count of Salm, who had distinguished himself at the Battle of Pavia in 1525. Salm arrived in Vienna as head of the mercenary relief force and set about fortifying the three-hundred-year-old walls surrounding St. Stephen's Cathedral, near which he established his headquarters. To ensure the city could withstand a lengthy siege, he blocked the four city gates and reinforced the walls, which in some places were no more than six feet thick, and erected earthen bastions and an inner earthen rampart, levelling buildings where necessary to clear room for defences.

Pavle Bakić, the last titular of the Serbian Despotate and ally of Ferdinand, provided 2,000 Serbian hussar cavalry to the defence of Vienna.

== Siege ==
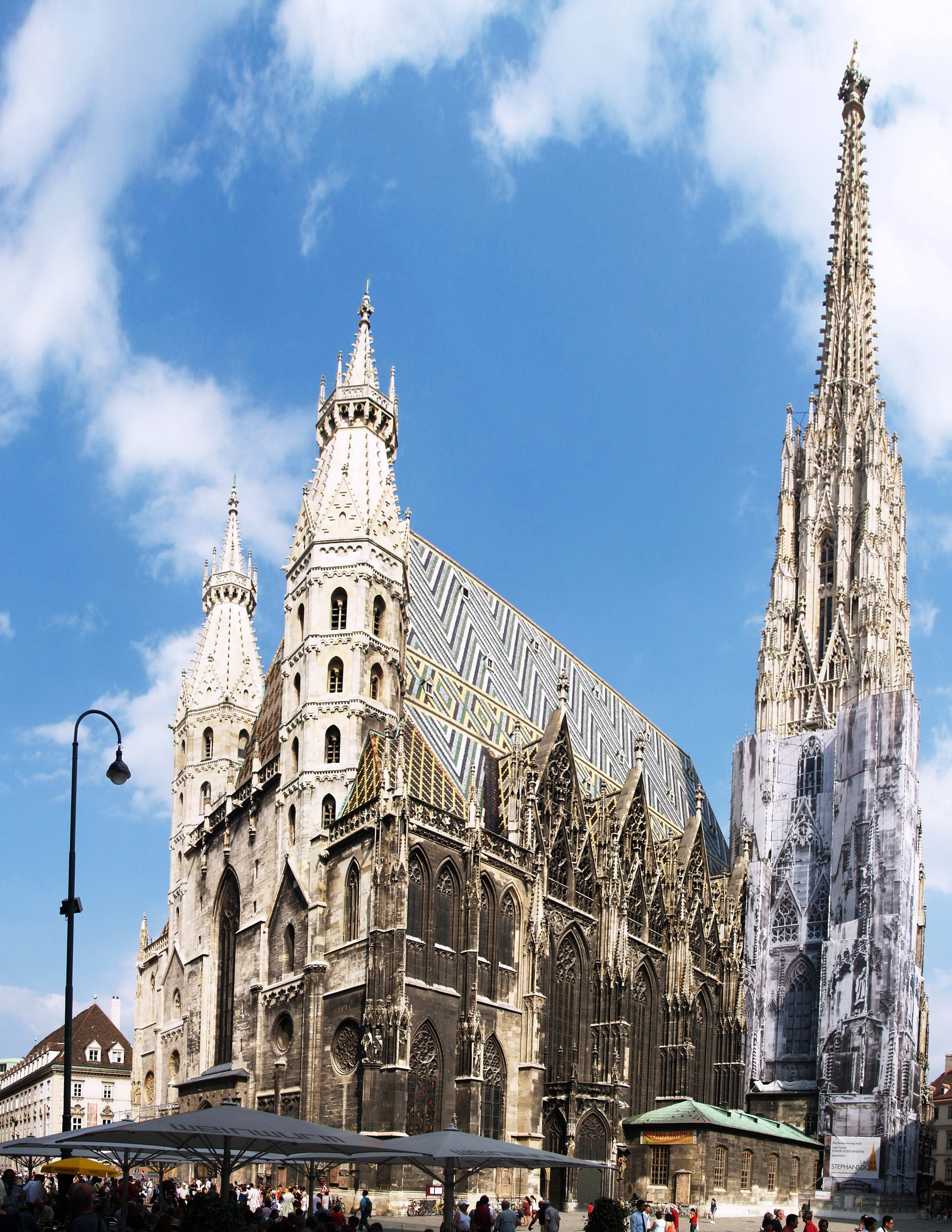
St. Stephen's Cathedral, Vienna, used as the informal headquarters of the Austrian resistance by Niklas Graf Salm, appointed head of the mercenary relief force.

The Ottoman army that arrived in late September had been depleted during the long advance into Austrian territory, leaving Suleiman short of camels and heavy artillery. Many of his troops arrived at Vienna in poor health after the tribulations of the long march through the worst of the wet season. Of those fit to fight, a third were Sipahis, ill-suited for siege warfare. Three richly dressed Austrian prisoners were dispatched as emissaries by the Sultan to negotiate the city's surrender; Salm sent three richly dressed Muslims back without a response.

As the Ottoman army settled into position, the Austrian garrison launched sorties to disrupt the digging and mining of tunnels below the city's walls by Ottoman sappers, in one case almost capturing Ibrahim Pasha. The first units to attack the Ottomans were mounted Serbian hussars under the command of Pavle Bakić. The defending forces detected and successfully detonated several mines that had been intended to breach the walls. On 6 October, 8,000 men were dispatched to attack the Ottoman mining operations. They succeeded in destroying many of the tunnels, but they sustained heavy losses when the confined space hindered their return to the city.

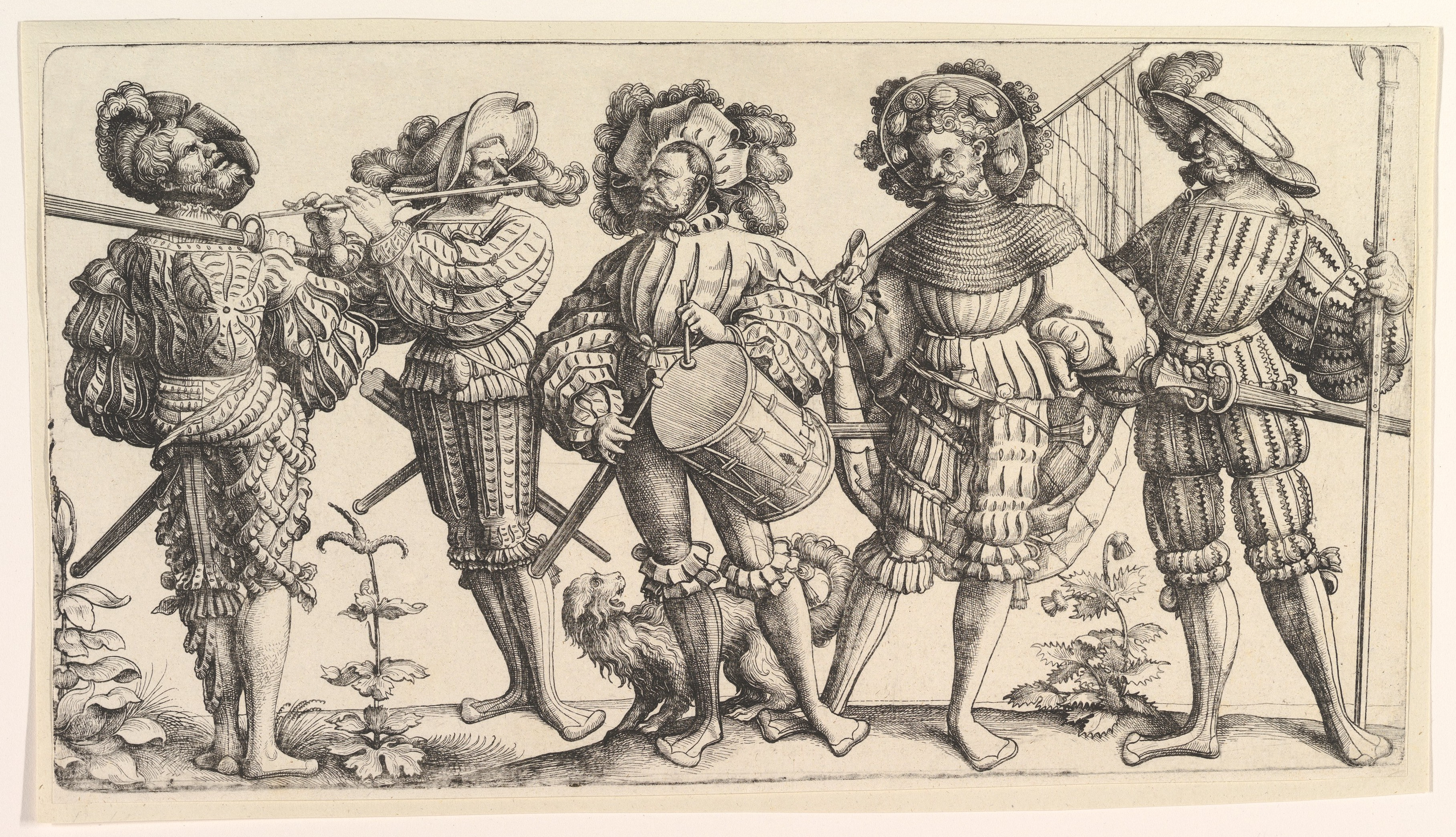
Depiction of German Landsknechts circa 1530, renowned mercenary infantry of the Renaissance period, famous for their pikes, long halberds, and Zweihänder swords.

More rain fell on 11 October, and with the Ottomans failing to breach the walls, the prospect of victory began to fade. In addition, Suleiman was facing critical shortages of food, water and other supplies, while casualties, sickness, and desertions began to take their toll. The janissaries began voicing their displeasure at the lack of progress, demanding a decision on whether to remain or abandon the siege. The Sultan convened an official council on 12 October to deliberate the matter. It was decided to attempt one final, major assault on Vienna, an "all or nothing" gamble. The assault was launched on 14 October, but despite extra rewards being offered to the troops, it was beaten back, with the defenders' arquebuses and long pikes proving decisive. The following day, with supplies running low and winter approaching, Suleiman called off the siege and ordered a withdrawal to Constantinople.

With unusually heavy snowfall, conditions deteriorated. The Ottoman retreat was hampered by muddy roads along which their horses and camels struggled to pass. Pursuing Austrian horsemen took many stragglers prisoner, although there was no Austrian counter-attack. The Ottomans reached Buda on 26 October, Belgrade on 10 November and their destination, Constantinople, on 16 December.

== Atrocities ==
During the siege of Vienna, the Ottoman troops pillaged the countryside around Vienna, killed many civilians and took many survivors as slaves. Peter Stern von Labach described it:

"After the taking of Bruck on the Leitha and the castle of Trautmannsdorf, the Sackman and those who went before him, people who have no regular pay, but live by plunder and spoil, to the number of 40,000, spread themselves far and wide over the country, as far as the Ens and into Styria, burning and slaying. Many thousands of people were murdered, or maltreated and dragged into slavery. Children were cut out of their mothers' wombs and stuck on pikes; young women abused to death, and their corpses left on the highway. God rest their souls, and grant vengeance on the bloodhounds who committed this evil."

Approximately 20,000 people are estimated to have been captured and kidnapped in to slavery in the Ottoman Empire, of which few ever returned: the Ottomans reportedly preferred young boys and girls and members of the clergy.

== Aftermath ==
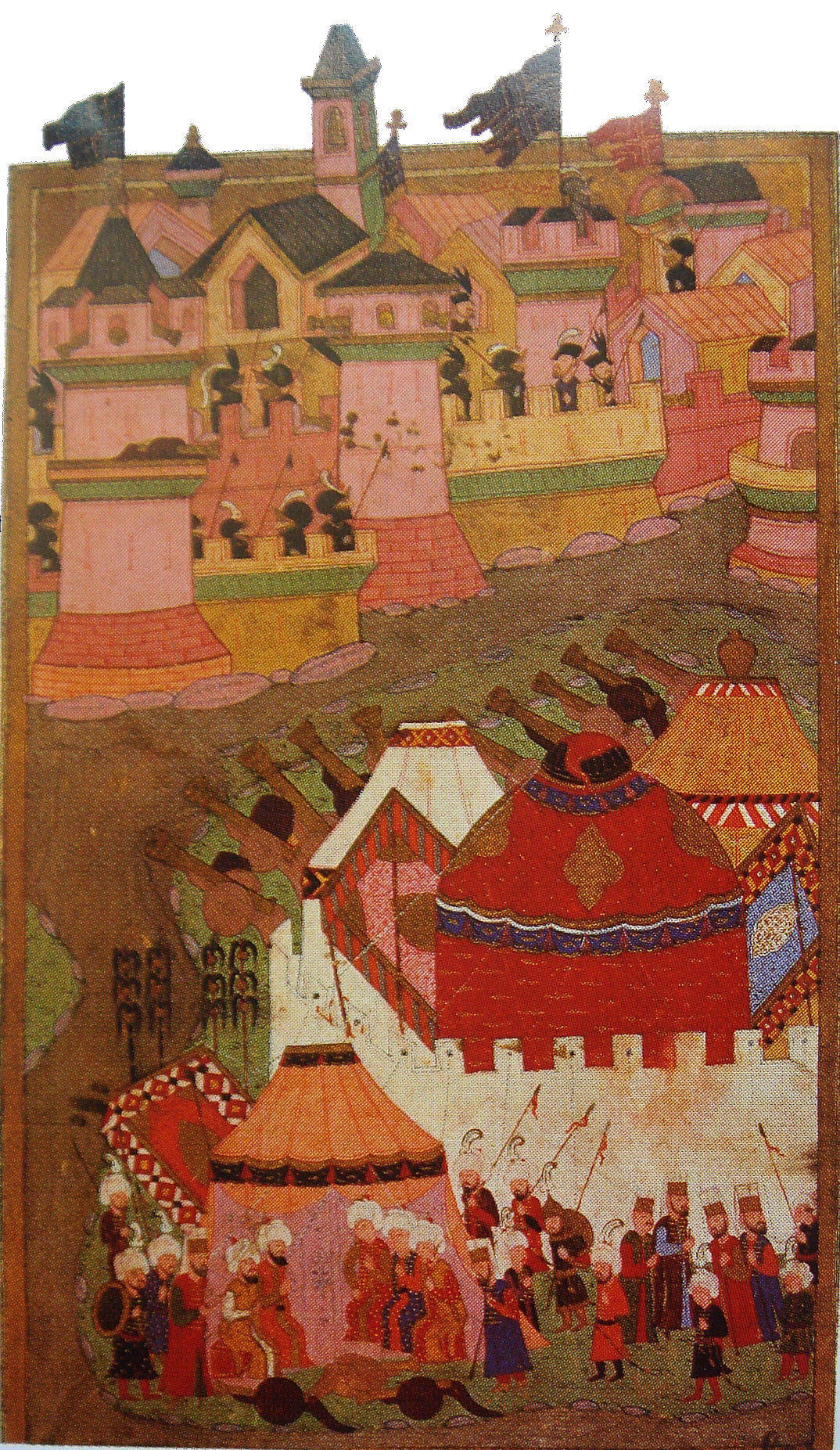
An Ottoman depiction of the siege from the 16th century, housed in the Istanbul Hachette Art Museum

As the Ottomans retreated, eight squadrons of cavalry and four companies of foot soldiers under the command of Katzianer and Bakić pursued them. The Ottoman rearguard was continuously attacked over a three-day period from 17 to 20 October. Over 200 Ottomans were killed, a pasha captured, and numerous Christian children rescued from captivity. Ottoman troops enacted a scorched-earth policy as they retreated, engaging in massacres, plundering and arson.

Some historians speculate that Suleiman's final assault was not necessarily intended to take the city but to cause as much damage as possible and weaken it for a later attack, a tactic he had employed at Buda in 1526. Suleiman would lead another campaign against Vienna in 1532, but it never truly materialised as his force was stalled by the Croatian Captain Nikola Jurišić during the siege of Güns (Kőszeg). Nikola Jurišić with only 700–800 Croatian soldiers managed to delay his force until winter closed in. Charles V, now largely aware of Vienna's vulnerability and weakened state, assembled 80,000 troops to confront the Ottoman force. Instead of going ahead with a second siege attempt, the Ottoman force turned back, laying waste the south-eastern Austrian state of Styria in their retreat. The two Viennese campaigns in essence marked the extreme limit of Ottoman logistical capability to field large armies deep in central Europe at the time.

The 1529 campaign produced mixed results. Buda was brought back under the control of the Ottoman vassal John Zápolya, strengthening the Ottoman position in Hungary. The campaign left behind a trail of collateral damage in neighbouring Habsburg Hungary and Austria that impaired Ferdinand's capacity to mount a sustained counter-attack. However, Suleiman failed to force Ferdinand to engage him in open battle, and was thus unable to enforce his ideological claim to superiority over the Habsburgs. The attack on Vienna led to a rapprochement between Charles V and Pope Clement VII, and contributed to the Pope's coronation of Charles V as Holy Roman Emperor on 24 February 1530. The outcome of the campaign was presented as a success by the Ottomans, who used the opportunity to show off their imperial grandeur by staging elaborate ceremonies for the circumcision of princes Mustafa, Mehmed, and Selim.

Ferdinand I erected a funeral monument for the German commander Nicholas, Count of Salm, head of the mercenary relief force dispatched to Vienna, as a token of appreciation of his efforts. Nicholas survived the initial siege attempt, but had been injured during the last Ottoman assault and died on 4 May 1530. The Renaissance sarcophagus is now on display in the baptistery of the Votivkirche cathedral in Vienna. Ferdinand's son, Maximilian II, later built the Castle of Neugebaeude on the spot where Suleiman is said to have pitched his tent during the siege.
