= Pierrot (Tamás Z. Marosi) =

Hungarian musician and game designer

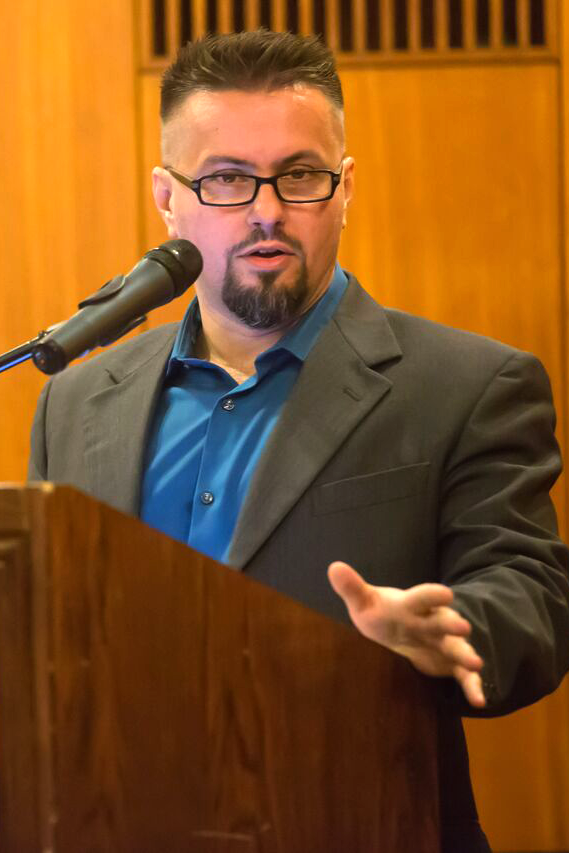
- Born: Tamás Z. Marosi; September 3, 1969; Budapest, Hungary
- Occupations: Musician, writer, game designer
- Years active: 35
- Organization: Private Moon Studios
- Known for: AGON video game series, Yoomurjak's Ring, Miazma or the Devil's Stone
- Notable work: Producer of over 40 music albums and numerous board games
- Style: adult-pop, world music
- Awards: Fonogram Hungarian Music Award (2018) eFestival(2007, 2008); Golden Giraffe (2003) eMeRTon (2000), several board game awards
- Website: www.privatemoon.com

Pierrot, born Tamás Zoltán Marosi (3 September 1969, in Budapest, Hungary) is a Hungarian pop singer, computer and tabletop game designer, musician and producer, best known internationally for his video game series AGON (Ancient Games Of Nations) and Yoomurjak's Ring. He is also well known in Hungary as a musician, singer-songwriter and producer of several music albums. His own music style is primarily acoustic “adult pop”, while as a producer, he has a colorful portfolio of various styles ranging from world music to alternative rock to reggae and hip-hop. He has also been involved in edutainment and tourism projects such as an interactive sight-seeing game network Kaland&Játék (Adventure&Game). He is author of a book on Asian gastronomy, a series of novels and a storybook for children. Since the mid-2010s, Pierrot has been primarily focused on tabletop board game development.

The name Pierrot had originally been his nickname. He has been using this alias both as musician and game developer since 1986.

== Biography ==
Pierrot was born in Budapest in 1969 as the only child of his parents. His creativity and talent for music was realized very early. Pierrot founded his first amateur pop band when he was 14 and his public appearances started soon after. The first studio recording took place in 1986. Pierrot has challenged himself in various fields of art.

In the first part of his career as a singer (1989–1995) he was famous for wearing a commedia dell’arte-style clown mask, covering half of his face only.

As a producer and composer, he created over 40 music albums up to 2010, including those performed by himself. A large number of his productions have gone golden and platinum in the country, with many top hits.

Pierrot established his music publisher company Private Moon Productions (1994), later Private Moon Records in 1999. They started as an independent firm, then became the label of Sony Music and subsequently EMI.

In 2004–2005, as a supporter of young musicians, Pierrot was producer (and head of jury) of a singer talent show (Pop Idol) on Hungarian television (Megasztár) as well as jury member of the national and international Eurovision Song Contest in 2015 and 2016.

He became engaged in video game development in 1997 when he started his second company Private Moon Interactive, later Private Moon Studios. The initial version of AGON was born in his mind in 1998. The concept, scenario, game design, 2D graphics, sound and music have been Pierrot’s personal fields of responsibility from the start. Yoomurjak’s Ring, a full-length interactive movie, is also a Private Moon production. This FMV (full motion video) game won first prize at the Hungarian eFestival 2007 in the category of interactive storytelling. Pierrot devotes much of his time to studying Asian culture. The motives of Chinese, Indonesian or Indian music often appear in his compositions. His book on Asian gastronomy was published in 2004 (Megkóstolni Ázsiát; publisher: Arterego, Hungary). The most outstanding manifestation of his passion for Chinese culture was his planned video game AGON: The Tales of the Four Dragons.

Pierrot has also been creating real-life games for the tourism industry. His interactive sight-seeing "games" derive from the concept of the Yoomurjak’s Ring project and are linked to it by a number of elements such as time travel and the character of Jonathan Hunt, the hero of Yoomurjak’s Ring.

From 2010, Pierrot has been increasingly active in board game development. He created a playable album of 24 abstract strategy board games and has dozens of tabletop games of his own creation released in Hungary and internationally.

== The musician ==
Pierrot has been a composer and music producer, creator of Hungarian top hits performed by other singers as well as himself.

He studied violin and piano in school and continued private musical education thereafter. Having recognized his creativity, his teachers and instructors gave him sufficient freedom for self-development. By the time his studies were finished he was already a popular artist as a pop singer and songwriter.

From 1988 Pierrot had spent several years as musical editor at a Hungarian commercial radio channel (Danubius) where he got access to a vast source of musical material. This background helped him to establish a career in the music industry and to acquire skills in studio work.

His first professional band was founded in 1986 (Pierrot álma – Pierrot’s dream). A ten-year period came when he performed on stage wearing a clown masque covering half of his face – or leaving half of it uncovered, as he prefers to put it. He challenged himself in theatre too in a number of occasions. In 1991 he composed music for the Hungarian stage adaptation of Anthony Burgess’s Clockwork Orange and had regular multimedia-based performances in Budapest’s traditional Bábszínház puppet/marionette theatre. In 2010 he was music composer of a children’s musical based on the story of the cartoon series Popeye. (L. Darvasi – Pierrot – Ganxsta Zolee: Popeye). Among his many singer-songwriter albums, the latest (Carousel) was released through crowdfunding.

He had been producer and many times composer of several albums for other Hungarian performers including Ganxsta Zolee (hip-hop) who also appears in Pierrot’s video game Yoomurjak’s Ring and lends his voice to certain characters in AGON. Pierrot was composer and producer of Ganxsta Zolee & Kartel's album K.O. (released in 2017) which went platinum and won a Fonogram at the Hungarian Music Awards in 2018.

A large part of the background music in Pierrot’s games are his own compositions. The title music of Yoomurjak’s Ring, Coming Back Home is one of them, co-written with Jamie Winchester, the singer of the English version. The Hungarian version (titled Otthon), which has also been published as a stand-alone music video, is performed by Pierrot himself.

== The game developer ==
=== Computer Games ===
Pierrot’s devotion to adventure gaming started at his first encounter with the genre in the early 1990s, especially with Robyn and Rand Miller’s graphic video game Myst. As an enthusiastic collector and reviewer, he launched a multilingual online adventure game magazine titled Inventory. From 1999, Pierrot was creative producer of GameStar (Hungary) magazine for years. This passion eventually drove him to make a game of his own: the idea of the AGON saga took shape in his mind in 1998. A few years later his company Private Moon Studios became one of the first game developers in Europe to release large-file graphic adventure games through the Internet (as a sequence of episodes).

In 2005 Pierrot and his team were entrusted with creating a video game as an unconventional means of promoting the tourist attractions of Eger, a Hungarian town with a considerable historic background. Pierrot chose the full motion video as the form of the game, featuring top Hungarian actors, amongst them György Bárdy (Bárdy György) who had already played the same character in a movie nearly forty years before (Egri Csillagok by Zoltán Várkonyi, 1968). Yoomurjak's Ring was based on a popular Hungarian novel written by Géza Gárdonyi in and about Eger in 1899. (The book was also published in English under the title Eclipse of the Crescent Moon). A sequel to the game was released in 2015 titled MIAZMA or the Devil's Stone (MIAZMA avagy az ördög köve in Hungarian), also with Jonathan Hunt as the protagonist.

Pierrot has been also involved in several types of game projects outside the computer game industry. These include edutainment projects as well as a network of interactive and playable sight-seeing programs for select Hungarian cities, including Eger.

=== Board Games ===
In the field of board game development, in addition to his reconstructions of ancient strategy board games (released in 2011 in the form of a playable book titled AGON), Pierrot has been expanding his portfolio with his own tabletop board game creations. His first published board game was Irány a Kincses Sziget! (Destination: Treasure Island, 2016), which achieved outstanding domestic success. This was followed by Rejtély a babaházban (Mystery in the Doll House, 2017), whose game board and cards depict 18th–19th century dollhouse interiors from the collection of the Hetedhét Toy Museum in Székesfehérvár. His first internationally released tabletop game hit the shelves in 2019. Over a dozen of his games were published by renowned publishers including Trefl, Piatnik and others. One of the most successful titles in this period was Rumini – hajónapló (Rumini – The Logbook, 2021), themed on a children’s book: it won two prizes and produced outstanding sales.

From 2023 onward, Private Moon Studios took over the publication of Pierrot’s board games. Its first in-house release was Pierrot’s winery-themed strategy game Cuvée (2023), followed by an expansion titled Rosé the following year. In 2024, the family game Caravanserai was released as the first installment in the planned Silk Road Adventures series, followed by three expansions (Dervish, Opium, and Anahita). Private Moon Studios also organized a nationwide championship and roadshow for this game. In the same year, the partisan adventure Twilight City, targeting expert gamers, was released with its expansion Maurice introducing a cooperative mode. Twilight City won the JEM Magazine award in Hungarian-developed games category. Related to the game’s dystopian theme, Pierrot has also been working on a novel, excerpts of which he has shared on social media. In 2025, the trading strategy game Kalmár – Merchants in Buda was released, along with its expansion Jester. In the same year, Private Moon Studios and Everland Studio collaborated on a successful Kickstarter crowdfunding campaign for Pierrot’s Robo Rescue and its introductory card game Robo Rescue Origins. The board game itself was released in 2026 (the English edition for backers by Everland Studio, the Hungarian edition by Private Moon Studios). Also expected in 2026 is Pierrot's cooperative board game Café Global, which features a café franchise theme and models the fierce competition between rival businesses.

Many more games are in development.

== The author ==
Under his real name Tamas Z. Marosi, Pierrot was co-author of a Hungarian rock music manual covering the eras 1950-1993.

As a fan of Asian culture, he was the author of a book on the gastronomy of India, China, Indonesia and Thailand. The book featured his collection of recipes and some of his own photos. (Atrerego, Budapest, 2005).

Upon the success of the game Yoomurjak's Ring Pierrot launched a series of novels under the title Jonathan Hunt Adventures in 2011. He has been working with co-writers on the novels. The protagonist is Jonathan Hunt, the American journalist who settles in Hungary and gets involved in various investigations. The plots are set in major historical places of Hungary. The books published so far in the series: Jumurdzsák gyűrűje (Yoomurjak's Ring, co-written with Sándor Szélesi, 2011), Az ördög köve (Devil's Stone, co-written with Endre Gábor, 2012) and Magister M (co-written with Endre Gábor, 2013). The series is in Hungarian, published by Alexandra, Hungary.

Pierrot presented 24 of his own classic abstract strategy board game illustrations in a large, playable album in 2011. The book features the three game boards already known from his AGON adventure games and in the iPad series (Tablut, Fanorona, Alquerque and The Royal Game of Ur) as well as several others with a brief history and rules of play. (Published in Hungarian by Alexandra)

In 2016, Pierrot’s first children’s book, Muszáj kalózok, populated with Playmobil figures, was published by Alexandra. A new edition followed in 2020, released by Főnix Könyvműhely. In parallel with the development of the board game Twilight City, he also began working on a new dystopian novel related to its theme, the first chapters of which he shared on his social media page.

== Games ==
Computer games

- AGON I. The London Scene (2003)
- AGON II. Adventures in Lapland (2003)
- AGON III. Pirates of Madagascar (2003)
- AGON I-II-III released also as The Mysterious Codex (2006)
- AGON IV. The Lost Sword of Toledo (2007)
- Yoomurjak's Ring (2006/2009)
- AGON II-III released also as From Lapland to Madagascar (2010)
- AGON-The Lost Sword of Toledo Special Edition (with Strategy Guide, Concept Arts, Soundtrailer, 2010)
- Ancient Games Of Nations - series of traditional board games for iPad (The Royal Game of Ur, Alquerque)
- ZANZA - online educational board game for mobile platforms (2015)
- MIAZMA avagy az ördög köve - Hungarian (2015)
- MIAZMA or the Devil's Stone - English (2017/2018)

Tabletop board games

- Destination: Treasure Island (Irány a Kincses Sziget!) (Trefl, 2016 Hungary)
- Rejtély a babaházban (Piatnik, 2017 Hungary)
- Répáskert (Modell&Hobby, 2018 Hungary)
- Underground Panic (Piatnik, 2019 Hungary, Czechia, Poland, Slovakia)
- Roundforest (Piatnik, 2020 international edition)
- Társasház (Keller&Mayer, 2020 Hungary)
- Rumini hajónapló (Pagony, 2021 Hungary)
- Barikarám (Keller&Mayer, 2021 Hungary)
- Monopolis (Compaya, 2022)
- Nomad (Piatnik, 2023)
- Cuvée (Private Moon Studios, 2023)
  - Cuvée: Rosé & Dessert Wine expansion (2024)
- Caranaserai (Private Moon Studios, 2024)
  - Caravanserai: Dervish expansion (2024)
  - Caravanserai: Opium expansion (2024)
  - Caravanserai: Anahita expansion (2025)
- Twilight City (2024)
  - Twilight City: Maurice expansion (2024)
- Fényes díszek card game (Shiny Baubles) (2024)
- Hímes tojások card game (Easter Eggs) (2025)
- Strandbüfé card game (Food Truck) (2025)
- Szörnyűző card game (Trick or Treat) (2025)
- Kalmár - Merchants in Buda (Private Moon Studios, 2025)
  - Jester expansion (2025)
- Inventory card game series (Private Moon Studios, 2025)
- Café Global (Private Moon Studios, 2026)
- Robo Rescue Origins card game (Everland Studio, 2025)
- Robo Rescue (Everland Studio, Private Moon Studios, 2026)

== Books ==
- Megkóstolni Ázsiát (Taste Asia, Arterego, 2005)
- Jonathan Hunt Adventures
  - Jumurdzsák gyűrűje (Yoomurjak's Ring; Pierrot-Szélesi Sándor; Alexandra, 2011)
  - Az ördög köve (Devil's Stone; Pierrot-Gábor Endre; Alexandra, 2012)
  - Magister M (Pierrot-Gábor Endre; Alexandra, 2013)
- AGON - 24 táblajáték a nagyvilágból (24 board games of the world; Alexandra, 2012)
- Muszáj-kalózok (A caribbean pirate story-book for children; Alexandra, 2016; Főnix Könyvűhely, 2020)

== Awards ==
- 1990: eMeRTon Award by Hungarian Radio for his first album Babaházak
- 1993: Hungarian Music Award (Golden Giraffe) for his music video Nekem senki nem hegedül (by Zoltán Marton)
- 2005: Category award for his music video Túl jól vagyok at the 2005 Kecskemét Animation Film Festival (by Miklós Weigert)
- 2007: First prize at eFestival in interactive story-telling (Yoomurjak’s Ring)
- 2008: eFestival special award (traffic safety multimedia "Útravaló" for Eduweb, Hungary).
- 2018: Fonogram - Hungarian Music Awards for Ganxsta Zolee & Kartel's album K.O. (producer - composer)
- 2021: Game of the Nation (Hungary, Ország Játéka contest) in family & party category (Rumini – Hajónapló)
- 2021: JEM Board Game Award (Játékos Emberek Magazinja) winner of national development category (Rumini – Hajónapló)
- 2025: JEM Board Game Award winner of the Hungarian-developed games category (Twilight City)

== See also ==
- Hungarian pop
