= Yoomurjak's Ring =

2006 video game

Yoomurjak’s Ring
- Yoomurjak's Ring cover art
- Developer: Private Moon Studios
- Designer: Pierrot (Tamás Z. Marosi)
- Platforms: Windows 2K/XP/Vista, iPhone, iPad
- Release: Hungary: October, 2006; Worldwide: April, 2009 (EN subtitled)
- Genre: Adventure
- Mode: Single-player

Yoomurjak's Ring (Hungarian: Jumurdzsák gyűrűje) is an FMV (Full motion video-based) point-and-click adventure game by Private Moon Studios, designed by Hungarian game designer and musician Pierrot (Tamás Z. Marosi) in 2005. The original release of the game was in Hungary in October 2006. The English subtitled version was first released by digital download in April 2009 by Lezard Interactive. The game became available for iPhone and iPad in 2015.

An important objective of the game is to introduce the baroque Hungarian town of Eger through a first-person experience provided by nearly 800 panoramic photographs and film footage fit for an entire movie.

The game has a sequel titled MIAZMA or the Devil's Stone (MIAZMA avagy az ördög köve, released on DVD in Hungarian in 2015).

== Gameplay ==
Yoomurjak's Ring is a point-and-click adventure game with a simple interface. It is a mixture of third-person movie scenes and first-person navigation and interaction. The player can pan around in each node in 360 degrees, in any direction.

The game inherited its engine from Private Moon's AGON series, with some enhancements. It features an Inventory for collecting items that will be used later. All dialog is logged in a separate notebook for reference. This is useful as dialog is not repeated.

As an adventure game, the player's first challenge is to figure out what to do next. Most of the clues are given in the dialog and narrations, some in documents.

The voice is the original Hungarian. The localized version is subtitled English.

== The plot ==
Jonathan Hunt is a young American journalist. He decides to visit his mother's birthplace in Hungary and the picturesque town of Eger because he has read about it in an old Hungarian novel. But he also has another reason to go there.

This book was one of his favorite childhood readings, titled ‘Eclipse of the Crescent Moon’, written by a Hungarian author Géza Gárdonyi who also lived in Eger. This is a real novel about the heroic past of Eger in the middle of the 16th century when the town was one of the ultimate strongholds against the Ottoman forces advancing. When Jonathan received that book from his great-grandfather he found two letters in it from a strange Hungarian scientist named Ábray, dated back in 1898. This man claimed to have discoveries about no less than travelling in time.

Upon arriving in Eger, Jonathan wants to find the descendants of this scientist. Juli, the assistant of the tourist office gives him a number of hints and an old man also seems to have some promising information. Jonathan learns about a family legend and the most peculiar disappearance of an apprentice who once worked for the scientist himself.

The legend is about the same old book. The old man believes that the author modeled Yoomurjak, the Turkish character in the book, on his grandfather, who was actually the disappeared apprentice. The gentleman claims that in that period Ábray was working on devising a time machine and due to a doomed journey in time his aide remained in the 16th century. Jonathan, a realistic man, almost laughs at the theory, but the sudden death of the old man awakens his curiosity. In a note left behind the old man entrusts Jonathan with accomplishing his unfinished research.

The game covers the events of five days:

- Day 1 (Eger, the town of legends)
- Day 2 (Proofs of the first time traveler)
- Day 3 (Yoomurjak's messages)
- Day 4 (On the track of the ring)
- Day 5 (The power of the ring)

== Characters ==
Jonathan Hunt: As to his identity in the game, he is the great-grandson of Professor Samuel Hunt, the protagonist of Private Moon's adventure game series AGON. His mother was born in Hungary and taught Jonathan the culture and the language of her home country. After breaking up with his girlfriend Allison, Jonathan aims to start an entirely new life in the peaceful town of Eger. But it turns out differently.

Yoomurjak: Yoomurjak (originally Jumurdzsák) is a (negative) hero of the novel, a fictitious character. In the novel, he was a soldier of the Ottoman army. Yoomurjak had an amulet: a ring that he wore to protect him from danger. Once, when he was captured he decided to buy his freedom against this ring. Later he tried to get it back but to no avail. The game uses the motive of this very ring, assuming it was found and used for purposes the player has to unfold in the game.

== Features ==
Over 30 locations: The fort, a number of museums, the town hall, the historic library, the Lyceum, the observatory, a wine cellar, an antique shop, the Eger minaret from the Turkish period, the immense basilica and many other locations are to be explored.

Professional actors: All these roles are played by professional Hungarian actors. The main characters are played by prominent Hungarian celebrities: László Görög, György Bárdy and in the gangster's role a popular rapper Ganxsta Zolee.

Panoramic views: The first-person view control and the large number of panoramic pictures provide a real-life feeling of walking around the streets of Eger and in the interiors. Most of the panoramic pictures are not static; the loop movements of the characters and extras make the exploration of the locations even more realistic.

More than 1.5 hours of footage: The film footage is presented to the gamers in many small fragments. The movie scenes and dialogue, starting from half a minute to nearly 10 minutes long, blend in seamlessly into the realistic environment created by panoramic pictures.

Special sound recordings: The atmospheric background noises were recorded in the original locations, just like most of the dialogue. Besides the mostly electronically scored mood-enhancing tracks, music also has a special role in the riddles of the game.

== Locations ==
A few of the historic locations in the game:

Eger: Eger is a city in northern Hungary, with a population of about 56,000. The town is a major touristic destination of the country. It is best known for its castle, thermal baths, historic buildings (including the northernmost Turkish minaret), and its red and white wines.

Senator Ház: The small hotel Jonathan uses (room No. 15) is one of Eger's oldest baroque buildings. It was built from the actual stones of the castle's outside walls some 300 years ago. One of its owners was a Senator, hence the name Senator Ház (the house of the senator).

Lyceum: The Lyceum was built for the purpose of a university. Today, a college operates in the building and it also houses several significant collections. The especially beautiful Archdiocesan Library was opened in 1793 with 20,000 volumes – currently, it houses nearly 150,000 volumes. The observatory and the Camera Obscura (a large periscope) was installed in 1776, equipped with the most modern apparatuses of the time, based on the design of astronomer Maximilian (Miksa) Hell.

Minaret: Eger was part of the Ottoman Empire for 91 years (1596–1687). During this time, numerous Turkish buildings were erected in the city, among them a mosque with this minaret. The mosque has not survived the centuries but the minaret, the northernmost one in Europe, is still in perfect condition. Jonathan has to climb 97 steps to reach the balcony.

The Gárdonyi House: Géza Gárdonyi is one of the best known writers in Hungary. Between 1897 and 1922, he lived in this house, and here wrote many of his works, including one of his most beautiful historical novels, Stars of Eger. Gárdonyi owned nearly ten-thousand books. Every piece of his furniture has remained in its original place, as shown in the game. He often took notes in cryptography which are displayed in the glass cabinets.

The Castle of Eger: This large medieval fortress ranks among the most visited attractions in the country. The castle's defenders are said to have numbered fewer than 2,000, including women and children when they successfully held off a Turkish army of 80,000 soldiers in 1552 (the Siege of Eger). Since then, the castle has been a symbol of patriotic integrity and resistance.

The Turkish Bath: The predecessor of the Turkish Bath, professor Cifra's favorite place, was built in the early 17th century when the town was under Turkish rule. The bath was to serve the purpose of ritual bathing but the water's beneficial effects on health soon became evident. The curative effect of the water is attributed to its radon content.

== The background ==
Private Moon Studios was given the opportunity to create Yoomurjak's Ring by winning a competition. The municipality of Eger was looking for alternative ideas for promoting their town in an unconventional way, making also use of Gárdonyi's popular novel (The Eclipse of the Crescent Moon) as both the author and the book are strongly related to the town.

== The creators ==
Game designer/producer: Pierrot (Tamás Z. Marosi)
Movie director: András Komlós
Chief Programmer: Gábor Csendes
Panoramic images: Tamás D. Varga
Music and Sound: Pierrot
Title Music: Pierrot & Jamie Winchester

== Awards ==
2007: First prize at eFestival in interactive story-telling (Yoomurjak's Ring)
