= Northern Hungary =

Coordinates: 48°6′N 20°46′E

Northern Hungary Észak-Magyarország
- Region
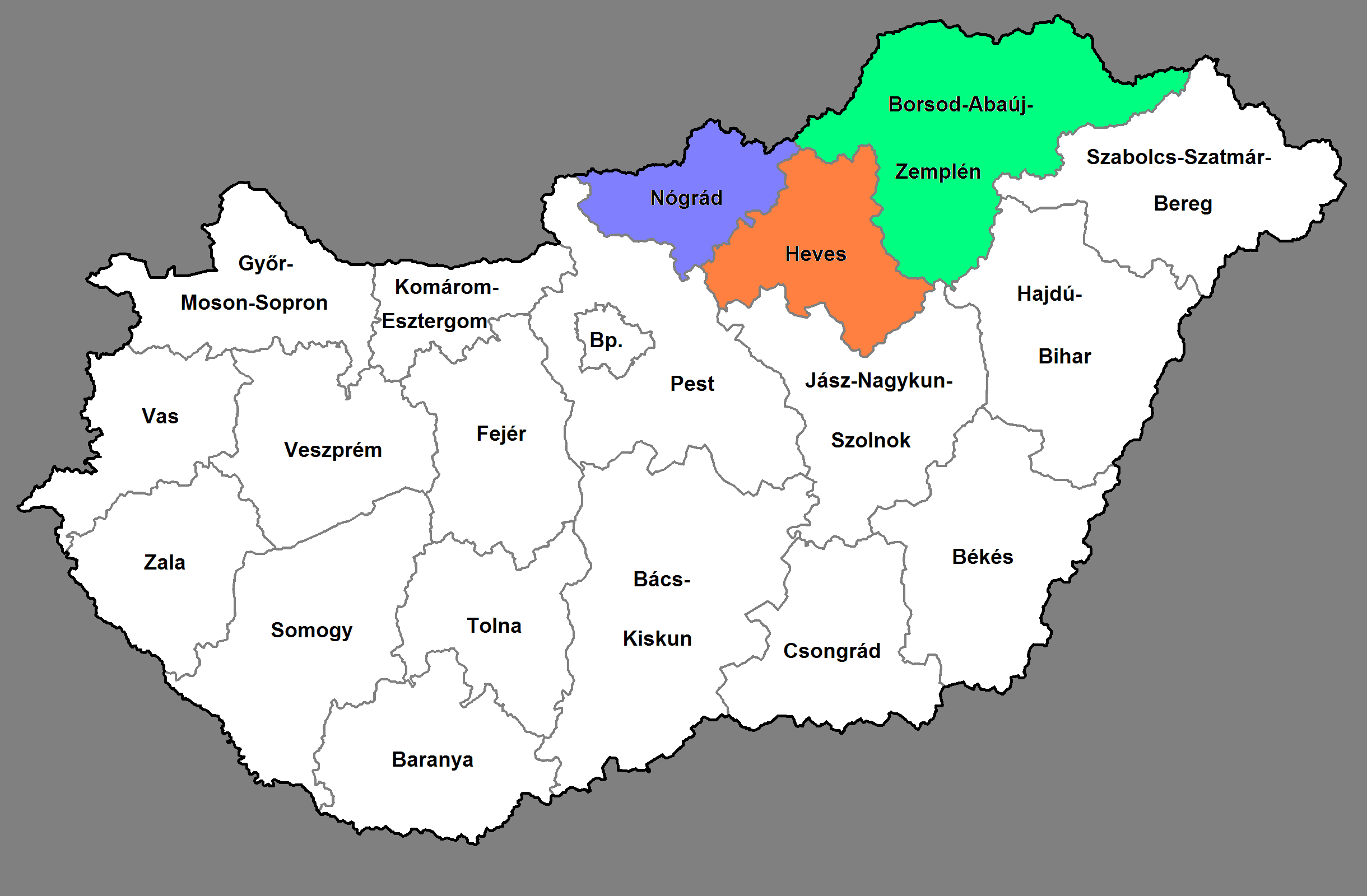
- Country: Hungary
- Capital city: Miskolc

Area
  - Total: 13,428 km^{2} (5,185 sq mi)

Population
  - Total: 1,209,142
  - Density: 90/km^{2} (230/sq mi)

GDP
  - Total: €14.412 billion (2024)
  - Per capita: €13,444 (2024)
- Time zone: UTC+1 (CET)
  - Summer (DST): UTC+2 (CEST)
- NUTS code: HU31
- HDI (2019): 0.811 very high · 7th

Northern Hungary (Hungarian: Észak-Magyarország, Hungarian pronunciation: ['eːsɒk 'mɒɟɒrorsaːg]) is a region in Hungary. As a statistical region it includes the counties Borsod-Abaúj-Zemplén, Heves and Nógrád, but in colloquial speech it usually also refers to Szabolcs-Szatmár-Bereg county. The region is in the north-eastern part of Hungary. It borders Slovakia to the north, the Northern Great Plain region of Hungary to the south-east, and the central region of Hungary to the south-west. The region's centre, largest, and capital city is Miskolc.

== Economy ==
=== Miskolc ===
Miskolc has a long industrial history, specifically in the steelworking and machine industry sectors. This history stretches back to the 18th century.

=== GDP, HDI ===
Northern Hungary has one of the lowest GDPs per capita (PPS) and HDIs in the country. To compare, while Northern Hungary has a GDP per capita (PPS) of €13,700 and a HDI of 0.811, Central Hungary had a GDP per capita (PPS) of €31,100 and an HDI of 0.922.

== Tourism ==
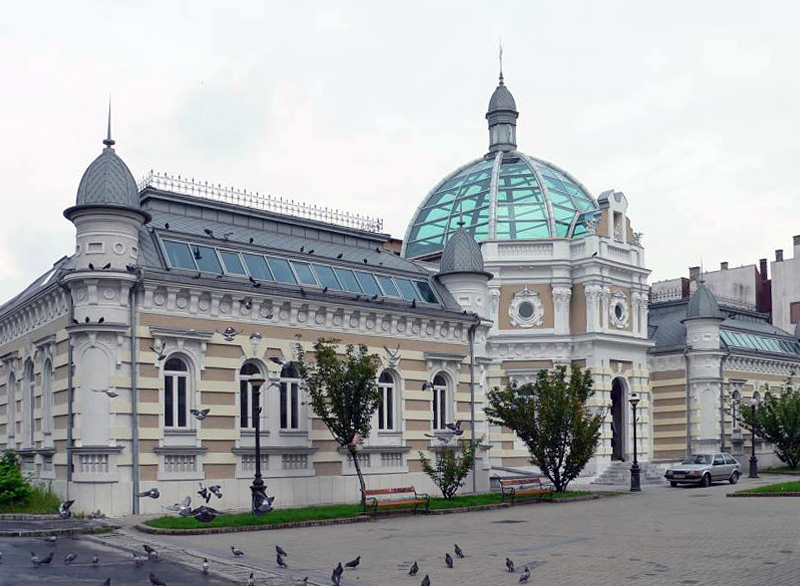
Elizabeth Square in Miskolc

=== Castles ===
Castles in Northern Hungary include: The Castle of Eger, the Castle of Diósgyőr, the Castle of Füzér, and the Castle of Sárospatak. The Castle of Eger is famous for its defense against Ottoman invaders in the 1552 Siege of Eger. The castle serves as the setting of Hungarian writer Géza Gárdonyi's Eclipse of the Crescent Moon (Hungarian: Egri csillagok lit. "Stars of Eger").

=== World Heritage Sites ===
The United Nations Educational, Scientific and Cultural Organization (UNESCO) has inscribed three World Heritage Sites in Northern Hungary: the Caves of Aggtelek Karst and Slovak Karst which is a transitional site between Hungary and Slovakia; the town of Hollókő; and the Tokaj wine region which is famous for being the producer of Tokaji wine.

== Cities and major towns ==
Cities and major towns in Northern Hungary include: Miskolc, Eger, Salgótarján, Ózd, Kazincbarcika, Mezőkövesd, Sárospatak, Sátoraljaújhely, Tiszaújváros, Tokaj, Gyöngyös, Szerencs, Hatvan, and Balassagyarmat.

== Culture ==
Northern Hungary is the home of the Palóc people, who speak the Palóc dialect of Hungarian. An example of traditional Palóc architecture in Northern Hungary is the town of Hollókő. The region also includes the town of Balassagyarmat which was once described by prominent Hungarian author Kálmán Mikszáth as being the "capital city of Palóc country."

== Notable individuals ==
Many notable Hungarian individuals were born or lived in Northern Hungary, especially from the city of Miskolc. Hungarian nobleman, lawyer, journalist, politician, and statesman Lajos Kossuth, well-known for his involvement in the Hungarian Revolution of 1848, was also born in the village of Monok which is located in Northern Hungary.

== Transportation ==
Transportation infrastructure in Northern Hungary includes the M30, and M3 highways which are connected to the rest of the European highway network. InterCity trains to Budapest arrive hourly, as well as freight and passenger trains to other destinations. The city of Miskolc also has its own bus, tram, and railway systems.

== Government ==
=== Politics ===
Northern Hungary has been a Fidesz stronghold ever since the 2010 Hungarian parliamentary election, as is the case with the rest of rural Hungary.

Control of Miskolc's local Municipal Assembly is currently held by an opposition coalition to the Fidesz-KDNP political alliance. The mayor of Miskolc is currently Pál Veres who is an independent.

== Statistics ==
- GDP (PPS) per capita

2000 : 6 774 € ▲

2001 : 7 519 € ▲845 €

2002 : 8 028 € ▲509 €

2003 : 8 426 € ▲398 €

2004 : 9 064 € ▲638 €

2005 : 9 321 € ▲257 €

2006 : 9 572 € ▲251 €

2007 : 9 981 € ▲409 €

- Fertility rate

2000 : 1,54 births/woman ▲

2001 : 1,47 births/woman ▼

2002 : 1,45 births/woman ▼

2003 : 1,41 births/woman ▼

2004 : 1,42 births/woman ▲

2005 : 1,44 births/woman ▲

2006 : 1,49 births/woman ▲

2007 : 1,45 births/woman ▼

2008 : 1,49 births/woman ▲

2009 : 1,47 births/woman ▼

- Unemployment rate, %

2000 : 10,1 % ▲

2001 : 8,5% ▼

2002 : 8,8% ▲

2003 : 9,7% ▲

2004 : 9,7%

2005 : 10,6% ▲

2006 : 11,0% ▲

2007 : 12,3% ▲

2008 : 13,4% ▲

2009 : 15,3% ▲

- Life expectancy

Men :

2000: 66,20 year ▲

2001: 66,73 year ▲

2002: 66,68 year ▼

2003: 66,68 year

2004: 66,97 year ▲

2005: 66,84 year ▼

2006: 67,37 year ▲

2007: 67,54 year ▲

2008: 67,90 year ▲

2009: 68,37 year ▲

Women :

2000 : 75,25 year ▲

2001 : 76,26 year ▲

2002 : 76,00 year ▼

2003 : 75,84 year ▼

2004 : 75,80 year ▼

2005 : 75,93 year ▲

2006 : 76,39 year ▲

2007 : 76,43 year ▲

2008 : 77,05 year ▲

2009 : 76,70 year ▼

== See also ==
- List of regions of Hungary
- NUTS of Hungary
