= Stars of Eger =

Stars of Eger may refer to:

- Eclipse of the Crescent Moon, an 1899 novel by Géza Gárdonyi known by this title
- Stars of Eger (1923 film), a Hungarian silent film adaptation directed by Pál Fejös
- Stars of Eger (1968 film), a Hungarian sound film adaptation directed by Zoltán Várkonyi
