= István Dobó =

Baron and soldier from Hungary

Baron István Dobó
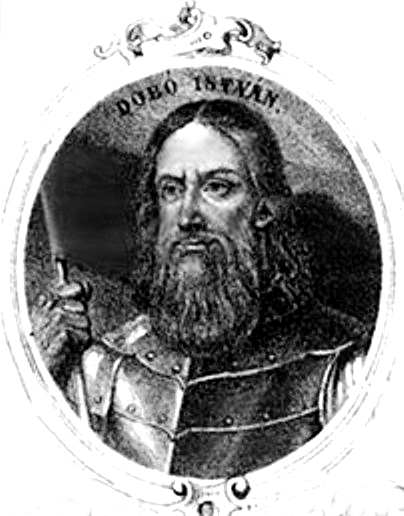
- István Dobó
- Born: c. 1502; Kingdom of Hungary
- Died: May 1572 (aged ~70); Szerednye (today Ukraine)
- Burial place: Church of Saint George, Ruszka, Slovakia
- Spouse: Sára Sulyok de Lekcse et Alsószopor
- Children: Damján Dobó (1557–1586) Ferenc Dobó (1558–1602) — High officer and commissioner of Dobó's monument. Krisztina Dobó (1560–1590) — Wife of poet Bálint Balassi.
- Relatives: István Bocskai (nephew-in-law, Prince of Transylvania) Bálint Balassi (son-in-law, famous Hungarian Renaissance poet) János Balassa (cousin and co-defender in court)
- Military career
- Allegiance: Kingdom of Hungary (Habsburg Monarchy)
- Service years: 1548-1569
- Rank: Commander; Baron (elevated 1553, re-confirmed 1558)
- Commands: Defence Garrison of Eger Castle (1548–1553); Defence Garrison of Szamosújvár (1553–1556)
- Conflicts: Ottoman–Habsburg wars: Battle of Mohács (1526); Siege of Eger (1552); Siege of Szamosújvár (1556)

Baron István Dobó of Ruszka (c. 1502 or 1505 – May 1572) was a Hungarian military commander, statesman, and landowner. He is most famous for leading the successful defense of Eger Castle against the Ottoman Empire during the historic Siege of Eger in 1552. Dobó later served as the Voivode of Transylvania (1553–1556) and the Count (főispán) of Bars County (1558–1569), becoming one of the most prominent magnates in the 16th-century Kingdom of Hungary.

== Early Life and Lineage ==
István Dobó was born into the ancient Hungarian noble family ruszkai Dobó.

- Father: Domonkos Dobó Jr. (fl. 1494–1508), landowner and envoy of Ung County to the Diet of 1505.
- Mother: Zsófia Czékely (fl. 1511), hailing from the ancient Kaplon clan.
- Paternal Grandparents: Domonkos Dobó Sr. (fl. 1445–1462), Ispán of Ung County (1460–1462), and Veronika Báthory of Ecsed (fl. 1466–1496).
- Maternal Grandparents: Nobleman János Czékey (fl. 1474–1490) and Borbála Upory.

Domonkos Dobó Jr. married Zsófia Czékey in 1498, and the couple had six children: Ferenc, László, István, Domonkos, Anna, and Katalin. As a young man, István Dobó took part in the disastrous Battle of Mohács in 1526, where the Hungarian army was defeated by the Ottoman Empire.

== Military and Political Career ==
Castellan of Eger and the Siege of 1552

In 1548, King Ferdinand I appointed Dobó alongside Ferenc Zay as joint castellan (várnagy) of Eger Castle. In 1551, István Mekcsey succeeded Zay as co-castellan. Under Dobó's command, extensive modernization and fortification work began at Eger to withstand Ottoman advances.

Dobó's career was clouded by legal feuds with neighbouring landholders. In 1551, Ferdinand I sentenced Dobó and two of his brothers to death and forfeiture of estates (fő- és jószágvesztés) over a violent land dispute involving their neighbour, Tamás Tegenyei. This sentence remained active throughout the siege, as Dobó only managed to secure a one-year suspension of execution prior to the battle.

Despite these legal troubles, Dobó achieved national renown during the Siege of Eger (September–October 1552). Facing a massive Ottoman army estimated at 40,000 troops, Dobó commanded a garrison of roughly 2,000 defenders, including his comrade Jób Paksy. Against overwhelming odds, the defenders successfully repelled numerous assaults and broke the Ottoman siege. Dobó himself was wounded in action.

The defense was celebrated in contemporary literature: chronicler Sebestyén Tinódi Lantos immortalized the battle in two historic songs, while Mátyás Csabai authored Latin praise poems honoring Dobó.

Voivode of Transylvania and the Defense of Szamosújvár

In recognition of his valor, King Ferdinand I granted Dobó the castles of Déva and Szamosújvár, elevated him to the rank of baron, and appointed him Voivode of Transylvania in 1553, sharing the office with Ferenc Kendi.

During his tenure in Transylvania, Dobó and his brother Domonkos were major patrons of Protestant scholar Gáspár Károlyi—who would go on to produce the first complete Hungarian translation of the Bible (the Vizsoly Bible)—funding his studies at the University of Wittenberg.

In 1556, the Transylvanian Diet decided to recall Queen Isabella Jagiellon. Consequently, Ottoman, Moldavian, and Wallachian forces invaded Transylvania. Dobó defended the fortress of Szamosújvár for over ten months against heavy siege. Receiving no reinforcements or relief from King Ferdinand, he was ultimately forced to surrender the castle. Despite Queen Isabella's promise of safe passage, Dobó was imprisoned in Szamosújvár, though he successfully escaped in 1557.

Economic Endeavors, Wealth, and Legal Feuds

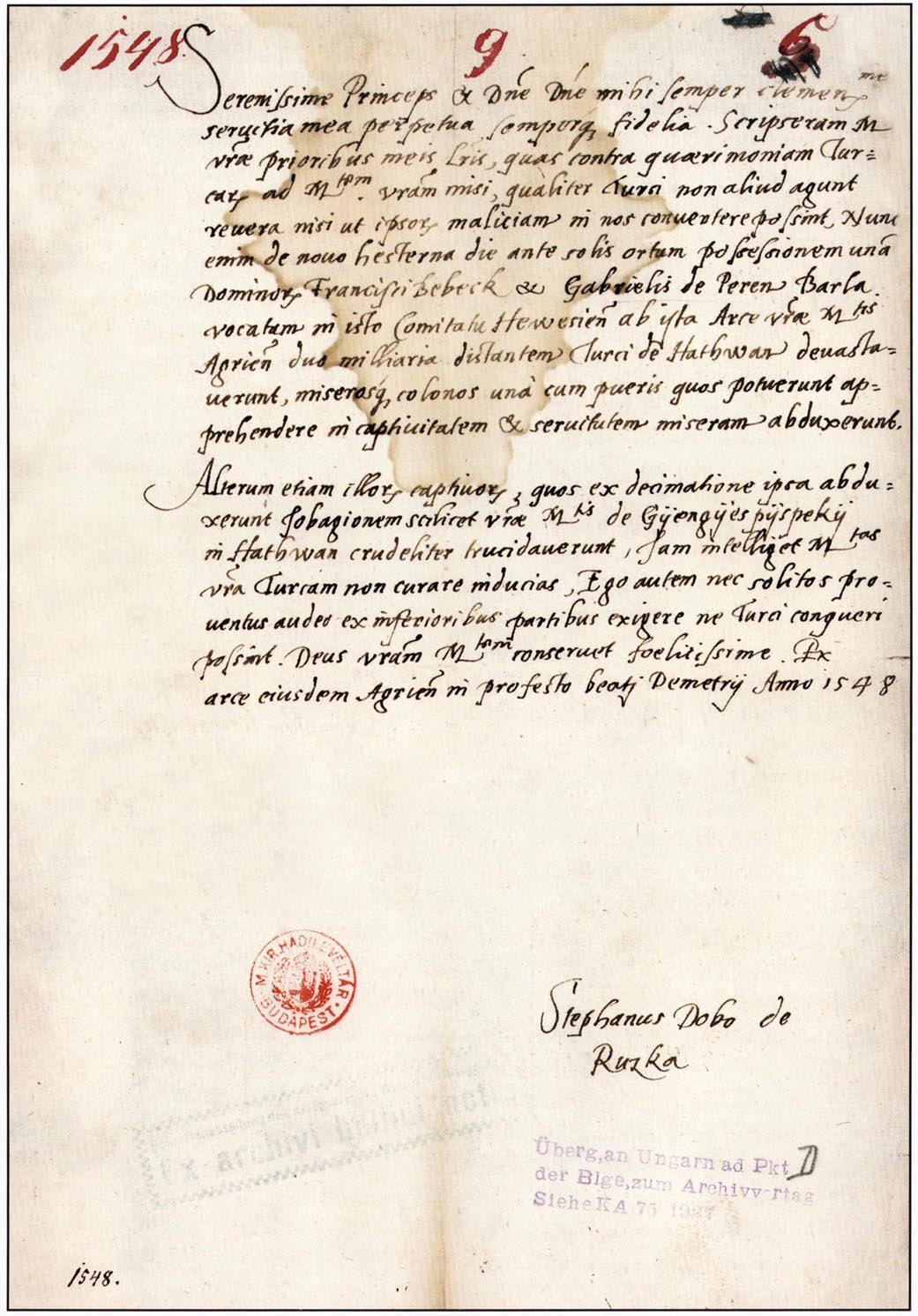
Report of István Dobó, Castellan of Eger Castle, to King Ferdinand I (1548)

Following Transylvania's separation from Habsburg control in 1558, Ferdinand I compensated Dobó for his lost Transylvanian estates by granting him Levice Castle (Léva). Re-confirmed in his baronial status, Dobó was named Count (főispán) of Bars County.

By the 1560s, Dobó had accumulated vast holdings to become one of the wealthiest landowners in Hungary. However, contemporary accounts also noted his ruthlessness and avarice. The Protestant writer Péter Bornemisza listed the Dobó brothers among the "greedy and deceitful" in his work On the Temptations of the Devil (Ördögi kísírtetek). Managing extensive grain, livestock, and wine trade, the brothers dealt harshly with competitors and neighbors, and frequently bypassed royal customs checkpoints near the Polish border.

Arrest and Final Years

The long-standing Tegenyei feud—fueled by political intrigues from the Perényi family, longtime rivals of the Dobó family—plagued István Dobó throughout his life. In 1568, he was arrested in Pressburg (Pozsony, modern Bratislava) over these disputes, but escaped to Levice Castle.

In 1569, Dobó was lured to the Diet of Pressburg, where he was arrested alongside his relative, János Balassa (father of the Renaissance poet Bálint Balassi). Stripped of his office of főispán, Dobó was imprisoned in Pressburg Castle on charges of high treason. He spent his final years in captivity, which severely broke his health. Upon his release in early 1572, he retired to his castle at Serednje (Szerednye), where he died shortly thereafter at around 70 years of age.

== Family and Personal Life ==
On October 17, 1550, Dobó married Sára Sulyok of Lekcse and Alsószopor. Her parents were Balázs Sulyok (Royal Chamberlain) and Erzsébet Pethő of Gerse. Through this marriage, Dobó became closely connected to the influential Bocskai family: Sára's sister Krisztina was the mother of Stephen Bocskai, future Prince of Transylvania.

Dobó and Sára Sulyok had three children:

1. Ferenc Dobó (1558 – September 14, 1602): Ispán of Bars County. He commissioned his father's Renaissance monument. He married firstly Erzsébet Báthory of Ecsed (sister of Andrew Báthory, Prince of Transylvania; not to be confused with her contemporary, the infamous "Blood Countess" Elizabeth Báthory) and secondly Judit Kerecsényi (daughter of Gyula castellan László Kerecsényi).
2. Damján Dobó (1557–1586).
3. Krisztina Dobó (1560–1590): Married Mihály Várady, then in 1584 her cousin, the renowned poet Bálint Balassi, and later Gáspár Pető.

Last Will and Testament (1558)

Dobó executed his last will on November 26, 1558, at Végles Castle:

"I, István Dobó of Ruszka, Ispán of Bars County, etc. ... considering that human life is fleeting and fragile, make this testament regarding the goods granted to me by the Lord God..."

In the document, Dobó reaffirmed earlier provisions made for his wife, Sára Sulyok. He acknowledged the severe hardships she endured alongside him—including captivity under Queen Isabella in Cluj (Kolozsvár) and Déva with their infant children, and the loss of her personal inheritance. In gratitude for her loyalty, he bequeathed to her Végles Castle and its appurtenances (valued at 20,500 Hungarian florins pledged by Emperor Ferdinand I). He placed his wife and children under the protection of Emperor Ferdinand I and King Maximilian of Bohemia, naming János Balassa of Gyarmat and his brothers as guardians.

== Death, Tomb, and Archaeological Discovery ==
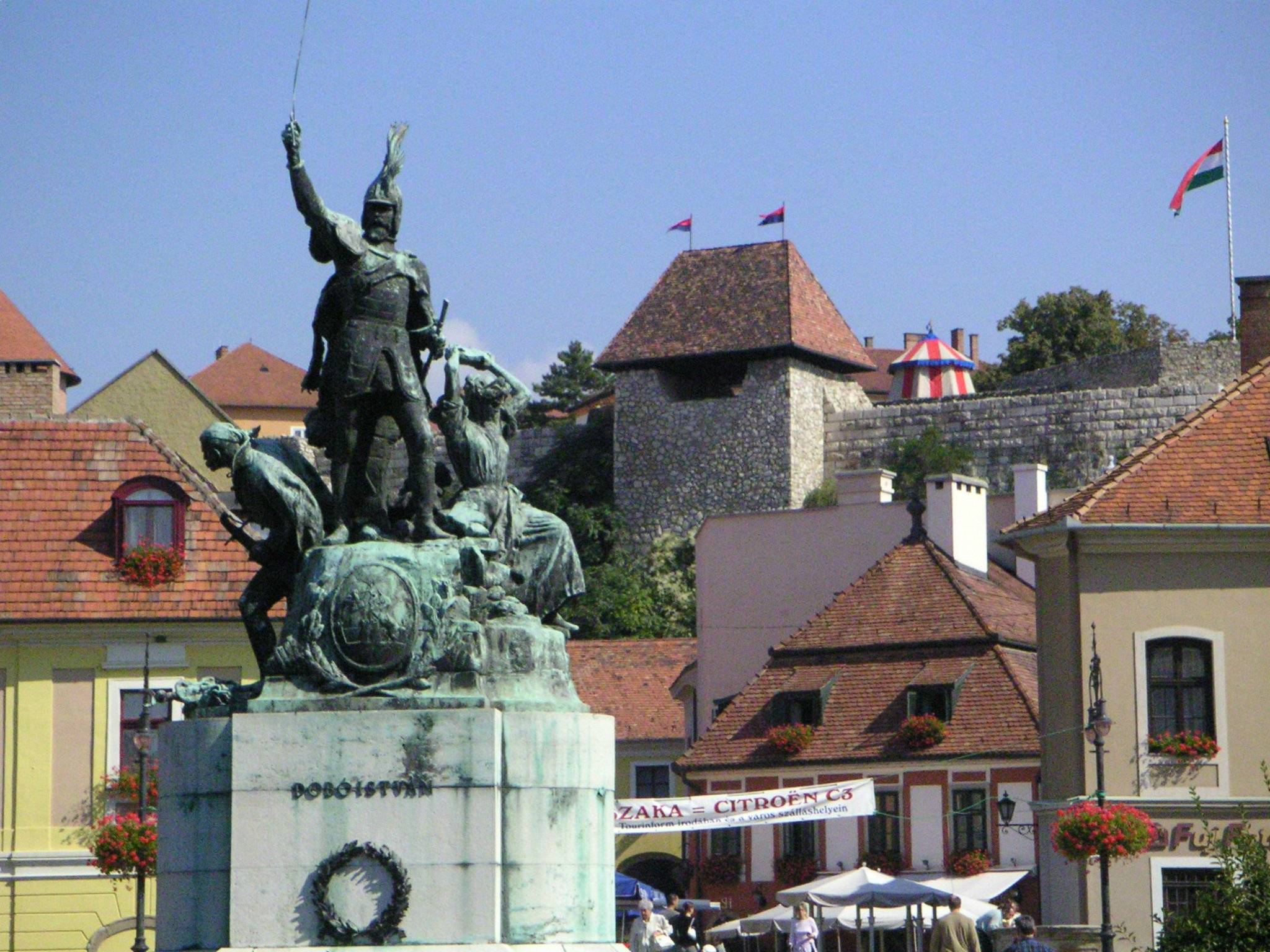
Monument to István Dobó in Eger, created by Alajos Stróbl (1907)

Dobó was buried on the family estate at Ruszka (modern-day Ruská, Slovakia).

- The Sarcophagus: A marble Renaissance sarcophagus was created by his son Ferenc and installed in the sanctuary of the Church of Saint George in Ruská. The original carved marble lid was removed in the 19th century by Count János Butler and brought to Eger in an attempt to gain favor with church officials for his marriage annulment—an incident later referenced in Kálmán Mikszáth's novel A Strange Marriage. Today, the original lid resides in the Heroes' Hall at the Dobó István Castle Museum in Eger, while a copy sits on the tomb frame in Ruská.
- Identification of Remains (2008): The exact location of Dobó's remains inside the church was uncertain until 2008. Following a two-year archaeological search, scientists uncovered a wooden coffin underneath the sanctuary floor on the south side. Anthropological analysis confirmed the remains belonged to a man aged around 70, measuring 180 cm (5 ft 11 in) in height, who suffered from severe gout.
- Reburial: On June 28, 2008, István Dobó was solemnly reburied inside the church in Ruská. His resting place remains a historical pilgrimage site for Hungarians.

Legacy and Cultural Impact

- Eger: The main town square of Eger bears his name (Dobó István tér), anchored by a bronze monument sculpted by Alajos Stróbl in 1907. The castle museum is officially named the Dobó István Vármúzeum.
- Literature: Dobó is the central figure in Géza Gárdonyi's classic 1899 historical novel Eclipse of the Crescent Moon (Egri csillagok), which remains one of the most widely read works in Hungarian literature.
- Film: In the acclaimed 1968 film adaptation of Eclipse of the Crescent Moon, Dobó was portrayed by legendary actor Imre Sinkovits.
