= Miklós Hajdufy =

Hungarian screenwriter and director (1932–2021)

- Born: 25 April 1932; Szombathely, Kingdom of Hungary
- Died: 8 April 2021 (aged 88)
- Occupations: Screenwriter; Director

Miklós Hajdufy (25 April 1932 – 8 April 2021) was a Hungarian screenwriter and director.

== Biography ==
After his secondary studies in Budapest, Hajdufy completed his military service, during which he participated in the theatre of the Hungarian Army. In 1960, he was admitted to the University of Theatre and Film Arts in Budapest, where he earned his degree in 1965.

Throughout his directing career, Hajdufy based much of his material off of works by famous Hungarian authors such as Mór Jókai, Géza Gárdonyi, Zsigmond Móricz, and others.

Miklós Hajdufy died on 8 April 2021 at the age of 88.

== Filmography ==
- Távolsági történet (1966)
- Sammy (1968)
- Volt egyszer egy borbély (1969)
- Kedd, szerda, csütörtök (1969)
- Eklézsia megkövetése (1970)
- Tizennégy vértanú (1970)
- Széchenyi meggyilkoltatása (1971)
- A lámpás (1972)
- György barát (1972)
- Hannibál utolsó útja (1973)
- És mégis mozog a föld (1973)
- Farkasok (1973)
- Ficzek úr (1974)
- Béla (1974)
- Egy nap Jersey szigetén (1975)
- A Rókus-templom harangjai (1975)
- Sakk, Kempelen úr! (1976)
- A szerelem bolondjai (1977)
- Császárlátogatás (1977)
- Mire a levelek lehullanak (1978)
- Kiálts, város! (1979)
- Le Duel (1979)
- Forró mezők (1979)
- Részeg eső (1980)
- Közjáték Vichyben (1981)
- A béke szigete (1982)
- Parancsra tettem (1984)
- Klapka légió (1984)
- A holtak hallgatása (1985)
- Szerelmek (1985)
- A halhatatlan ember (1985)
- Az Angol Királynő (1986)
- Illatszertár (1987)
- A megoldás (1987)
- Ragaszkodom a szerelemhez (1987)
- Oktogon (1988)
- A kis cukrászda (1989)
- Kéz kezet mos (1989)
- Csalással nem! (1990)
- Zakíts helyettem (1991)
- Nem válok el (1991)

== Distinctions ==
- Balázs Béla Award (1975)
- Knight of the Hungarian Order of Merit (2006)
