= Gergely Bornemissza =

Hungarian national hero

Gergely Bornemissza (1526, Pécs – 1555, Constantinople) was a Hungarian soldier and national hero.

Not much is known of his early life, although he is known to have been married twice. He is believed to have been an educated man, and a Lutheran.

He is mainly known for his role as an explosives expert in the Siege of Eger (1552).

After the siege, he was given command of the Castle of Eger. In 1554 he was captured by the Turks, and was executed by hanging in Constantinople after he refused to betray secrets about the defences at Eger.

He is the hero of Géza Gárdonyi's novel Eclipse of the Crescent Moon on which a hugely successful Hungarian musical was based.
