= Stars of Eger (1923 film) =

1923 film

- Directed by: Pál Fejös
- Written by: Géza Gárdonyi (novel); Pál Fejös
- Produced by: Tibor Eckhardt; Károly Löllbach
- Starring: Mara Jankovszky; Zoltán Makláry; Ili K. Takács
- Cinematography: Gyula Papp
- Production company: Magyar Kultúrház
- Distributed by: Magyar Kultúrház
- Release date: 1923
- Country: Hungary
- Languages: Silent; Hungarian intertitles

Stars of Eger (Hungarian: Egri csillagok) is a 1923 Hungarian silent historical film directed by Pál Fejös and starring Mara Jankovszky, Zoltán Makláry and Ili K. Takács. It is an adaptation of the 1899 novel Eclipse of the Crescent Moon by Géza Gárdonyi. A second film adaptation was made in 1968. The film's sets were designed by the art director István Básthy.

== Cast ==
- Mara Jankovszky - Éva Cecey
- Zoltán Makláry - Jumurdzsák
- Ili K. Takács - Mrs. Cecey
- Gyula Stella
- Gyula Zilahi
- Sándor Fülöp
- Nándor Bihary - István Dobó
- Elemér Baló
- Lajos Réthey - Priest
- Johann von Vásáry
- László Angyal - Hangman
- Béla Pogány - Bálint Török
- Béla Sziklai - Gergely Bornemissza
- Kornélné Jolán Sziklay
- Rezsõ Szántó
- Ferenc Szécsi

== Bibliography ==
- Cunningham, John. Hungarian Cinema: From Coffee House to Multiplex. Wallflower Press, 2004.
