= Ilona Kassai =

Hungarian actress (1928–2025)

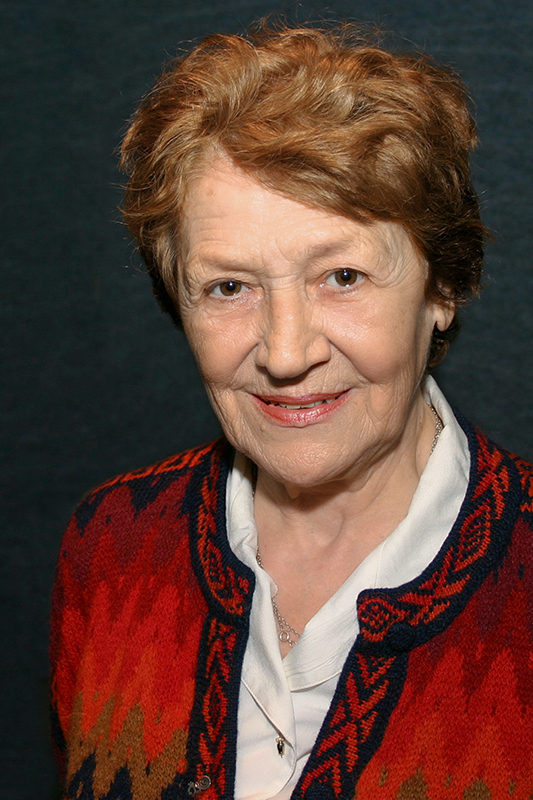
- Kassai in 2005
- Born: Ilona Hiller; 8 July 1928; Szeged, Hungary
- Died: 28 October 2025 (aged 97)
- Occupation: Actress
- Years active: 1949–2025
- Children: Ganxsta Zolee
- Awards: Kossuth Prize

Ilona Kassai (née Hiller; 8 July 1928 – 28 October 2025) was a Hungarian actress recognised for her long career and prominent work in Hungarian dubbing.

== Early life ==
Ilona Kassai was born in Szeged, Hungary on 8 July 1928. She studied at Lehotay Árpád's private acting school in Szeged, trained under instructors including Abonyi Tivadar and János Rajz. In 1949, at age 19, she was admitted to the Academy of Drama (Színművészeti Főiskola) in Budapest, though she temporarily returned home before graduating.

== Career ==
Kassai began her career in 1949 with the Állami Bányász Színház (State Miners' Theatre), later becoming a founding member of the Állami Déryné Színház (1951). From 1976, she performed at the Budapesti Gyermekszínház (later Arany János Theatre) and was at Ruttkai Éva Színház for three years starting in 1985. Her noted roles include: Melinda in Bánk bán, Desdemona in Othello, Antigone in Antigone and Lady Milford in Intrigue and Love.

She appeared in multiple Hungarian and international productions, including: Old Lady in the Window in Tinker Tailor Soldier Spy (2011), and The Last Kingdom.

Kassai was also known as the Hungarian voice for Maggie Smith (Minerva McGonagall in the Harry Potter series) and Angela Lansbury, and dubbed characters in Columbo, Sherlock Holmes, and animated works such as The Aristocats, Anastasia and The Fox and the Hound.

== Personal life and death ==
After marrying her first husband, opera singer János Kassai, she changed her surname in order to avoid confusion with Adolf Hitler's surname. Her second husband was lyricist Kálmán Fülöp. In 1965, she married her fourth husband, actor József Zana, from whom she divorced in 1984. Their child is musician Zoltán Zana who became famous under the stage name Ganxsta Zolee. Kassai was hospitalised with COVID-19 in 2023 but recovered.

She lived in a care home near Budapest, remained active in voice work, and received the Jászai Mari Prize in 1961 and the Kossuth Prize in 1963. Kassai died on 28 October 2025, at the age of 97.
