= Hungarian hip-hop =

Music genre or scene

Hungarian hip hop is popular among the inner city/urban population in Hungary. Performers include a gangsta rap pioneer, Ganxsta Zolee, his local fellow Dopeman, L.L. Junior and Sub Bass Monster.

== The beginning and domination in mainstream ==
It began with a rapper named Ganxsta "Döglégy" Zolee (b. Zoltán Zana, 7 January 1968) and his clique The Kartel. He is the son of a high-class actor family and is a professional ice-hockey player. In musical grounds he was originally the drummer for a hard rock band Sex Action before forming his then-underground gangsta rap collective in 1995. Their first album Egyenesen a gettóból ("Straight out the Ghetto") was not a commercial success and gained little radio airplay, though their first single "Boom a fejbe" ("Boom to the Head") reached the top 20 on a major record megastore sales chart that was published weekly in Danubius Rádió (the only commercial radio station with full country coverage then). Their second and third LP's, Jégre teszlek ("Put you on Ice") and Helldorado, were big successes with the latter having a Latino rap influence and being certified platinum (50,000).

== The mainstream and the underground ==
The underground hip hop artist always attacked the mainstream hip hop artists because their music is too popular and they are "selling" their music for everybody. The underground hip hop musician's creations are most imaginative and have more message than the mainstream. The most well-known Hungarian underground hip hop publishers are: Kriminal Beats, WacuumAirs, Gimmeshot, S-10, Garage, Bloose Broavaz.

== Gangsta rap ==
Meanwhile, one of the members of the Kartel, Lory B left the crew and converted a born again Christian and starting a solo effort in Christian rap. Another member O.G. Sámson release "Ganjaman" a single written in jungle rap genre that became also successful thanks to its weed-worshipper lyrics and nudist video. The group adopted a new member Dopeman who had street credibility with his suburban-gipsy background. His trademark is a rapping technique similar to Master P's "Uhh!" sound and the use of enjambements in his verses. Later he quit the band and started a solo career as well as producing new artists including acts such as Fekete Vonat (Eng.: Black Train) a trio who have used traditional roma techniques in their hip hop recordings and MC Ducky a female rapper and Majka Papa a former Való Világ (Real World) runner-up. His own album Magyarország rémálma (Eng.: Nightmare of Hungary) became a gold album (15,000) in 2000 and Fekete Vonat's A város másik oldalán (Eng.: On the other side of the city) has reached platinum in 2001. It contained the title track with the same name, which gained major radio airplay as well as TV videoplay. Its tune was sampled from Bill Withers' "Just the two of us". In 2003 Majka's Az ózdi hős (Eng.: The Hero of Ózd) was also awarded gold and had a duo single with his producer sampling the Dr. Dre beat Nuthin' But a "G" Thang. The street-macho image has been strengthened by a TV boxing ceremony entitled Starbox, an attempt to get rival celebrities into a fistfight. All Majka, Zolee and Dopeman participated and fought well.

== Comedy rap ==
Simultaneously a new genre of rap was about to emerge, which was much more built upon the unique features of Hungarian language in rhyming, word-plays, jokes and ambiguities. First it was developed by the RAPülők (1992–1994) and then by the hip hop duo Animal Cannibals beginning from 1995. In the same year their first single "Takarítónő" (Eng.: Cleaning Lady) was a hit with radio and TV airplay. They were the first Hungarian group ever to get played in MCM a French music TV station (single "Kérek egy puszikát!"). Their success inspired many upcoming groups and by utilizing their fame Animal Cannibals launched a new series of MC battles nationwide in local clubs called the Fila Rap Jam in 1996. Its goal is to invite the winners to Budapest into a final contest in which the champion selected by the audience is given a record deal. One of their first newfound talents was Sub Bass Monster, whose first album Félre az útból (Eng.: Get out of the way) went platinum in 2000 and the second one gold in 2001. An example of his funny metaphors is the title of his third single "Négy Ütem" (Eng.: Four Strokes) that was a reference to the four steps of breathing in marihuana. In some characteristics the style as a whole can be compared to those from Eminem's first solo material as well as to D-12's.

== R&B ==
Rhythm and Blues is still in its infancy in Hungary.

== Romani hip hop ==
Many Hungarian rappers are of Romani (Gypsy) descent. Well-known Hungarian rappers of Roma descent include Joci Pápai and VZS.

== Aftermath ==
Until 2006 Gangsta Zolee and The Kartel's first disc also received platinum status and due to Hungarian sales awards changes during the years it has become the only recording to reach the 120,000 copies platinum limit in the post-communist music history of Hungary and still remains the highest selling rap and pop CD ever (although bootlegging and high taxes on data medium have a very big and growing effect on the low sales indexes). The limit has been gradually lowered right after and was set to 20,000. Ten albums and one greatest hits were recorded by the Kartel from which five are gold and two are platinas. They also composed the main theme for the 2001 Division I Ice hockey championship in Hungary as well as for boxer Janos "Bonebreaker" Nagy a former IBO world junior-lightweight champion and WBO world junior-lightweight champion title challenger against Jorge Rodrigo Barrios. They also remade American songs for example Revolving Door and Check Yo Self. Recently one of Zolee's former protégés Ogli G got paroled and formed a new label and released Egyenesen a férfiházból (Eng.: Straight outta the brothel) that is - in its title - a homage to the Kartel's first record. He's the first gangsta rapper whose reputation is backed up with a prison sentence. Ganxsta Zolee nowadays gets into acting and participating in political late night shows. Dopeman has recently played in his own reality show. Ogli is looking for an American record deal.

== See also ==
- Music recording sales certification
- Hungarian music (disambiguation)
