= Isten Rabjai =

Hungarian book

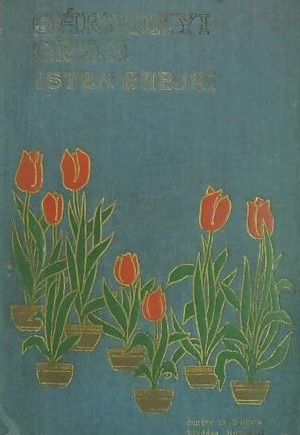

Isten Rabjai, translated variously as Prisoners of God, God's Slaves, or Captives of God, is a 1908 historical novel by Géza Gárdonyi. It was adapted into a 1942 film. Agoston Pacséry directed. József Bécsi was the cinematographer.

The story recounts the tale of Saint Margaret of Hungary. It is set in the 13th century after an invasion by Tatars.

== Additional sources ==
- Kovács, Árpád (2024). "A női princípium figuralitása az Isten rabjai című regényben" (PDF). Partitúra (in Hungarian): 13–22.
- "A regény és a valóság: Gárdonyi Géza és történelmi regényei: Isten rabjai (1908)". Magyar Nemzeti Levéltár (in Hungarian). 20 January 2016.
- Bodnár, Dániel (29 December 2022). "Isten rabjai – Idén száz éve hunyt el Gárdonyi Géza". Magyar Kurír (in Hungarian).
- Berényi, Kornélia (18 January 2022). "Margit, az Árpád-házi királylány alakja és kora, Gárdonyi Géza tolmácsolásában – 780 éve született Árpád-házi Szent Margit". Felvidék.ma (in Hungarian).

== See also ==
- List of Hungarian films 1901–1947
