= Ruská =

Village in Michalovce District, Slovakia

Ruská Dobóruszka
- Municipality
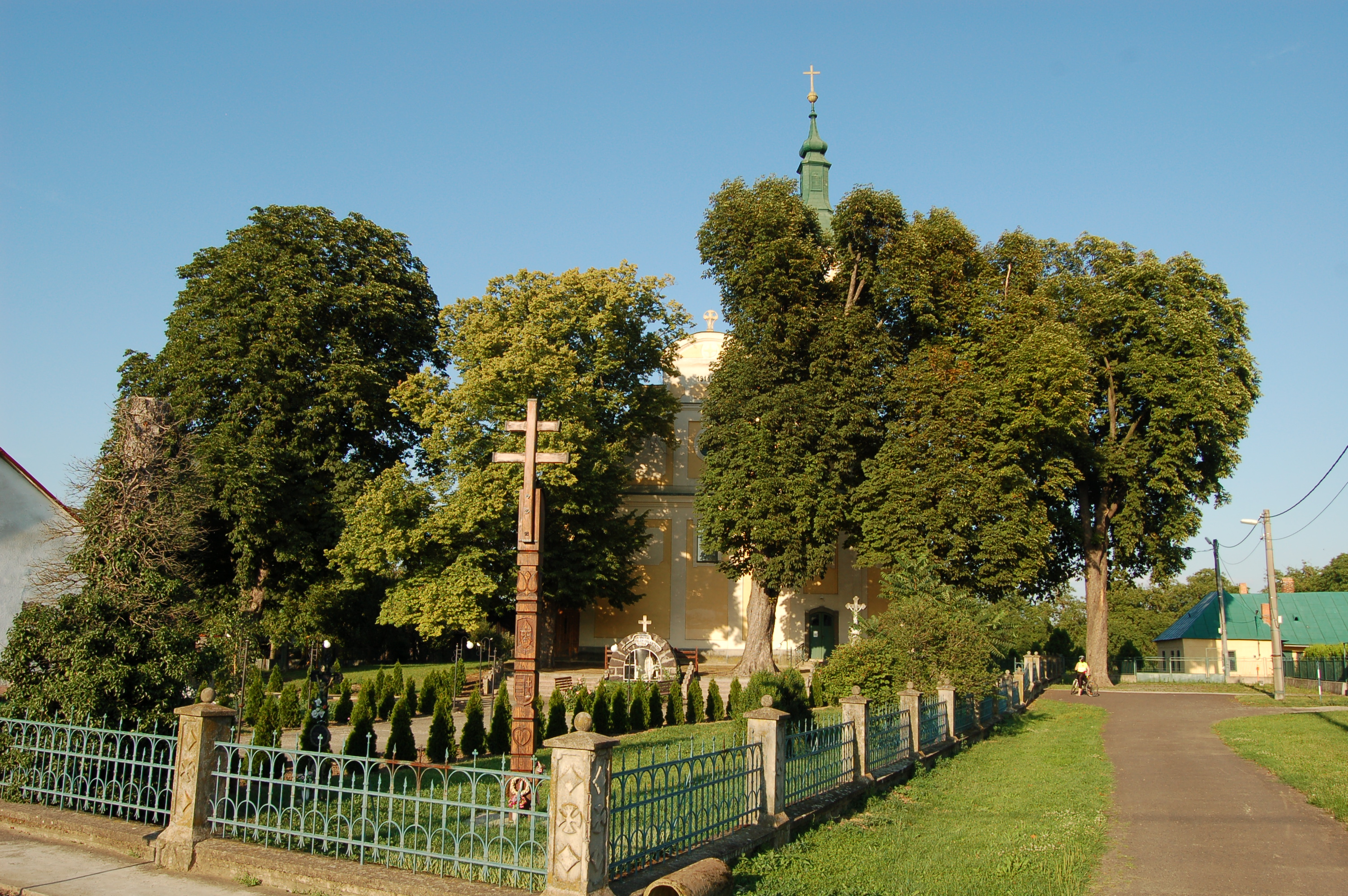

- Flag Coat of arms

- Location of Ruská in the Košice Region Location of Ruská in Slovakia
- Coordinates: 48.53°N 22.15°E
- Country: Slovakia
- Region: Košice Region
- District: Michalovce District
- First mentioned: 1195

Area
  - Total: 11.90 km^{2} (4.59 sq mi)
- Elevation: 103 m (338 ft)

Population (2025)
  - Total: 613
- Time zone: UTC+1 (CET)
  - Summer (DST): UTC+2 (CEST)
- Postal code: 767 7
- Area code: +421 56
- Vehicle registration plate (until 2022): MI
- Website: www.ruska.sk

Ruská (Hungarian: Dobóruszka) is a village and municipality in Michalovce District in the Košice Region of eastern Slovakia.

== History ==
In historical records the village was first mentioned in 1195. This makes it one of the oldest recorded villages in not only Michalovce District but in the entire Košice Region.

== Geography ==
The municipality lies at an altitude of 103 metres (338 ft) and covers an area of 11.90 km^{2} (4.59 sq mi) (2025).

== Population ==
Population statistic (10 years)
Year	1995	2005	2015	2025
Count	571	592	613	613
Difference		+3.67%	+3.54%	+0%

Population statistic
Year	2024	2025
Count	615	613
Difference		−0.32%

It has a population of 613 people (31 December 2025).

=== Ethnicity ===
Census 2021 (1+ %)
Ethnicity	Number	Fraction
Hungarian	418	68.63%
Romani	116	19.04%
Slovak	79	12.97%
Not found out	23	3.77%
Total	609	

In year 2021 was 609 people by ethnicity 418 as Hungarian, 116 as Romani, 79 as Slovak, 23 as Not found out and 1 as Russian.

Note on population: The difference values of population numbers in the table "Population statistic" and in the sections "Ethnicity" & "Religion" is caused by the use of various statistical methods.

=== Religion ===
Census 2021 (1+ %)
Religion	Number	Fraction
Roman Catholic Church	357	58.62%
Calvinist Church	143	23.48%
Greek Catholic Church	43	7.06%
None	38	6.24%
Not found out	19	3.12%
Evangelical Church	8	1.31%
Total	609	

In year 2021 was 609 people by religion 357 from Roman Catholic Church, 143 from Calvinist Church, 43 from Greek Catholic Church, 38 from None, 19 from Not found out, 8 from Evangelical Church and 1 from Other.

== Famous people ==
- Burial site of István Dobó, Hungarian captain of Eger

== Culture ==
The village has a small public library and an association football pitch.
