= A bor =

Play by Géza Gárdonyi

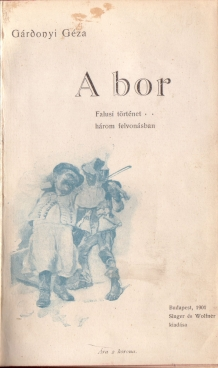
First edition

A bor ("The Wine") is a Hungarian play, written by Géza Gárdonyi. It was first produced in 1901. It established the Hungarian peasant drama as a more realistic form.

The play has been translated into Finnish, Italian, Polish and Romanian.

There is a 1933 Hungarian film version.
