= Eclipse of the Crescent Moon =

1899 novel by Géza Gárdonyi

Eclipse of the Crescent Moon (Hungarian: Egri csillagok lit. "Stars of Eger", Hungarian pronunciation: [ˈɛgri ˈt͡ʃilːɒgok]) is a historical novel by the Hungarian writer Géza Gárdonyi. It was first published in 1899 and is one of the most popular and widely recognized novels in Hungary.

== Background ==
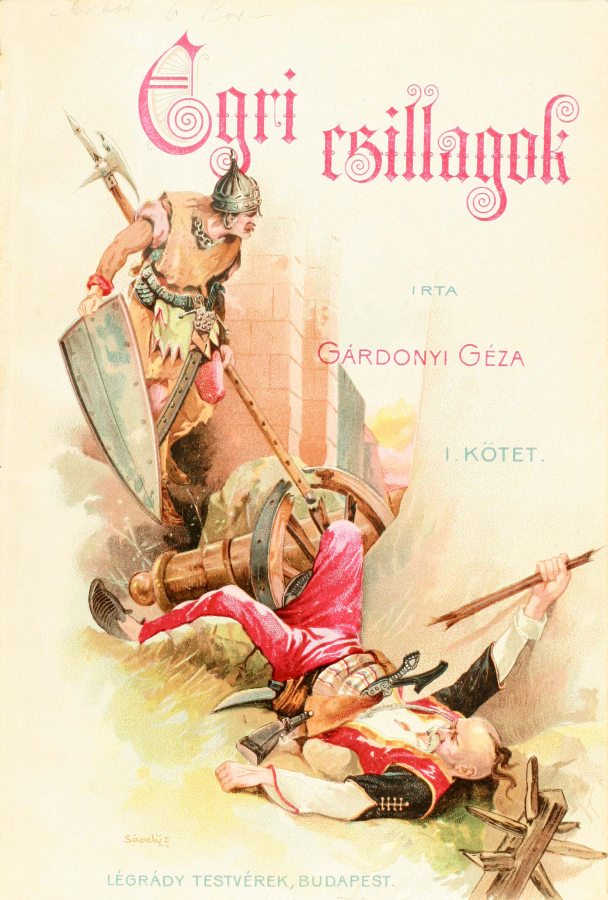
Cover of the first edition

The story is set in the first half of the 16th century and covers a period of roughly 25 years. The main historical events that are addressed are the bloodless occupation of Buda, the seat of the Hungarian kings, in 1541, and the 1552 Siege of Eger (now in Northern Hungary) by the Turks that forms the major topic of the novel. The story also addresses some other historical topics like the impact of the Reformation, the discord between Hungarians and the Holy Roman Emperor, as well as many themes of general import like mercy, filial and marital love, friendship, trust and truthfulness.

Most characters of the book are historical figures, notably the hero Gergely Bornemissza himself, though most of them have been strongly romanticized according to the author's intentions. Gergely's life story in the novel is almost fully invented, except for his role as an officer during the siege of Eger. Éva Cecey, Gergely's love and later wife, is fictional; her portrayal in the novel is based on Gárdonyi's "ideal woman".

== Plot summary ==
The novel consists of five parts that tell the life of Gergely Bornemissza from the age of eight until the year 1552, when he is in his early thirties.

I. Gergely is a half-orphan and son of a poor woman, while Éva Cecey is the daughter of a landowner. They are nevertheless playmates. While playing in the woods, the two children are captured by a Turk named Jumurdzsák and have to join a trek of prisoners. Due to the cunning of little Gergely, the two children are able to escape and later also to free the other prisoners. Gergely's mother dies in a raid by the Turks, but the little boy is adopted as a foster son by the rich aristocrat Bálint Török, where he gets a good education.

II. Several years later, Gergely has to experience that Buda is captured by the Turks through deceit and his foster father Bálint Török is led away prisoner. Gergely meets Éva again, who has become a pretty young girl.

III. Gergely learns that Éva who is an excellent rider and fighter is to be married to the cowardly Adam Fürjes at the request of the queen. They flee together and get married. Together with some friends they plan to free Bálint Török from his prison in Istanbul. They go to the Ottoman city, but despite many adventures, they finally fail in freeing the Hungarian aristocrat.

IV. It is 1552, a force about 200,000 Turks is approaching the little town of Eger, the citadel of which is only defended by 2000 soldiers. István Dobó, captain of the citadel, calls on the troops of the emperor for aid, but no-one arrives. Gergely joins the forces who are preparing to fight in Eger, while leaving Éva home with their little son. Shortly after he has left, a stranger arrives and kidnaps the little boy. Éva realizes that the stranger must have been the Turk Jumurdzsák. She understands that there must be a connection with the siege of Eger, so she masquerades as a man and tries to enter the besieged castle.

V. Even though the forces of the Turks are overwhelming, the Hungarians in Eger are able to defend themselves. Eger's strong walls and the high morale of its defenders allows the fortress to withstand five major assaults and continuous cannon fire - almost 12,000 cannonballs land inside the fortress before the siege ended. In a stroke of unparalleled ingenuity, Bornemissza devises primitive but lethal grenades and powder keg sized bombs to use against the attackers, as well as a water-mill wheel packed with gunpowder which he rolls into the Ottoman ranks. Éva finally arrives at Eger. Though the Ottomans attack again and again, the citadel stands firm, with also the women of Eger joining the battle. Finally, the Ottoman forces withdraw. Gergely's and Éva's little son is exchanged for a Turkish boy who has been captured, and the family is finally reunited.

== Film, TV or theatrical adaptations ==
The novel was adapted for film twice:

- Stars of Eger (1923), a silent film directed by Pál Fejős.
- Stars of Eger (1968), a sound film directed by Zoltán Várkonyi

== See also ==
- Yoomurjak's Ring

== Gallery ==
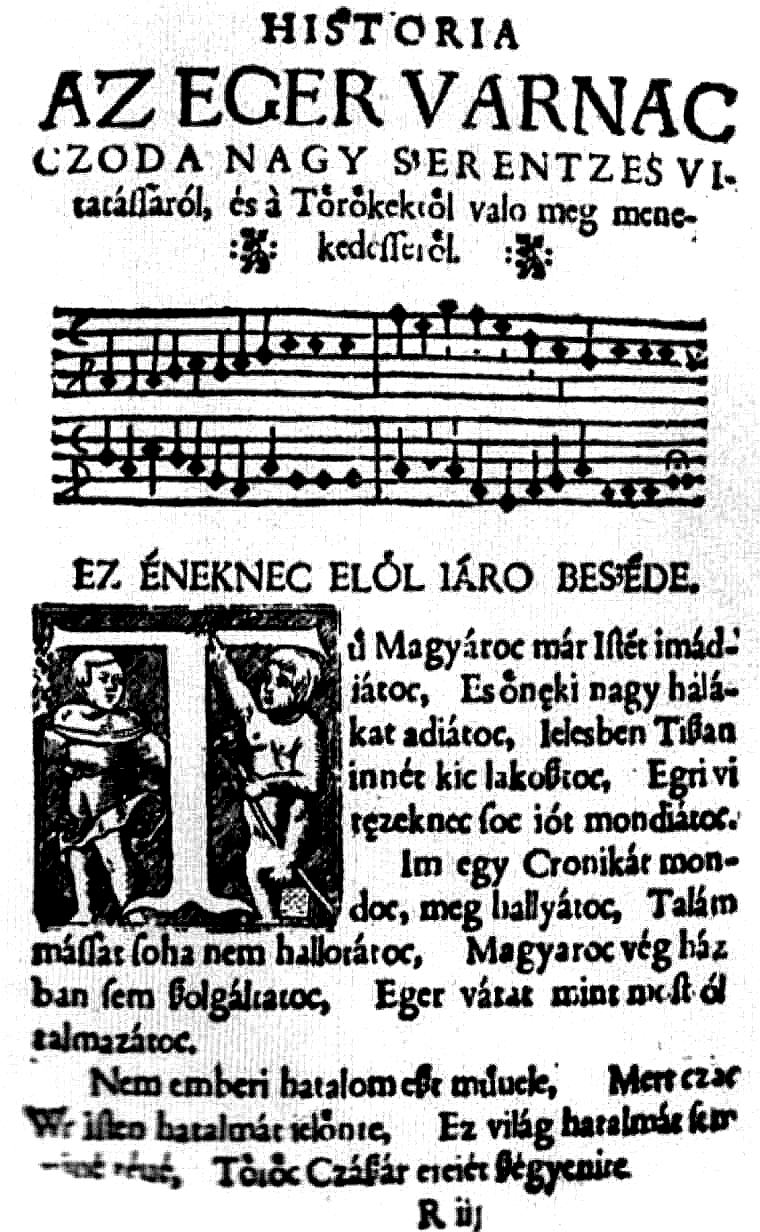
Tinódi: Song about battle of Eger castle on pages of Cronica

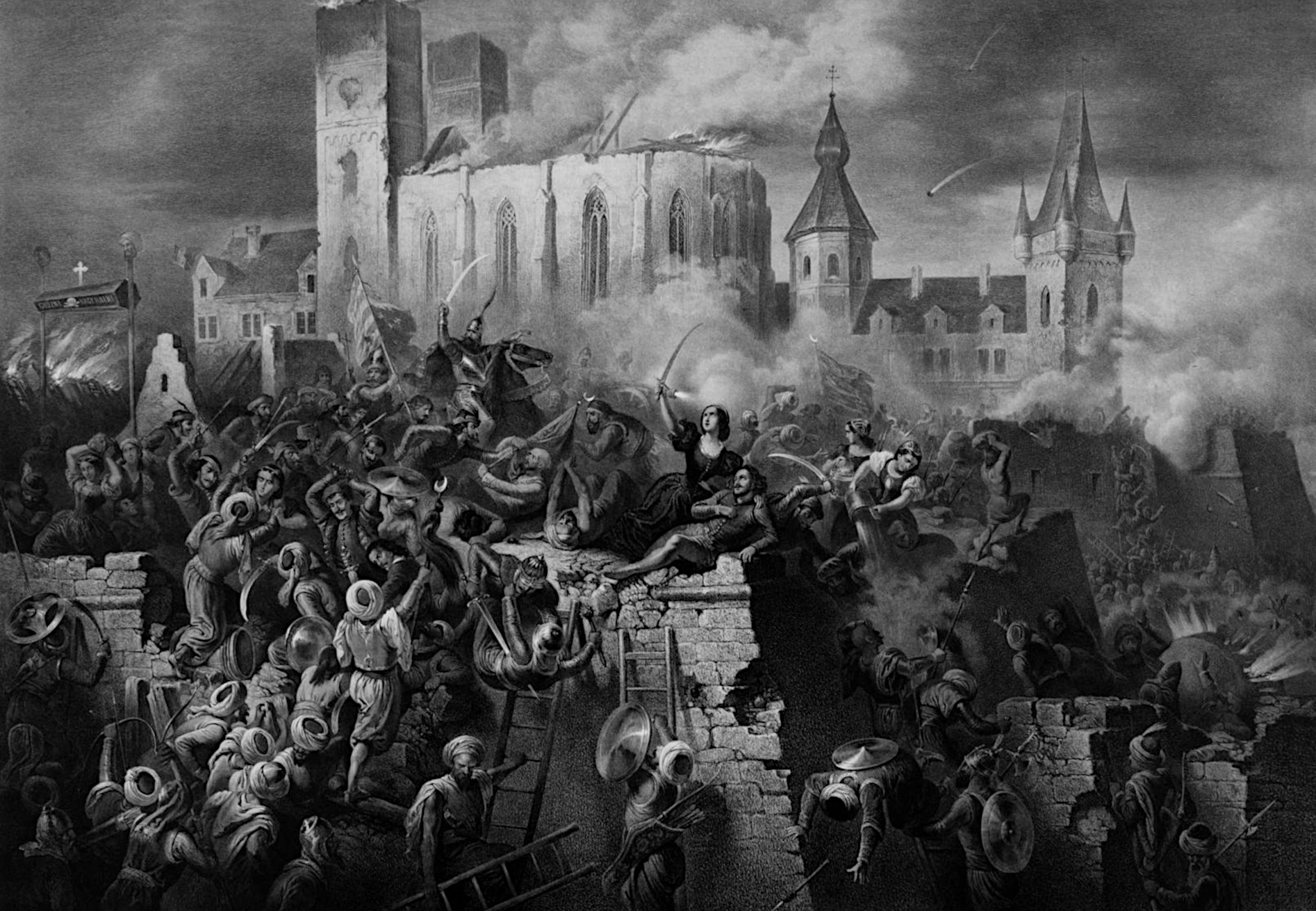
Béla Vízkelety: Battle of Eger

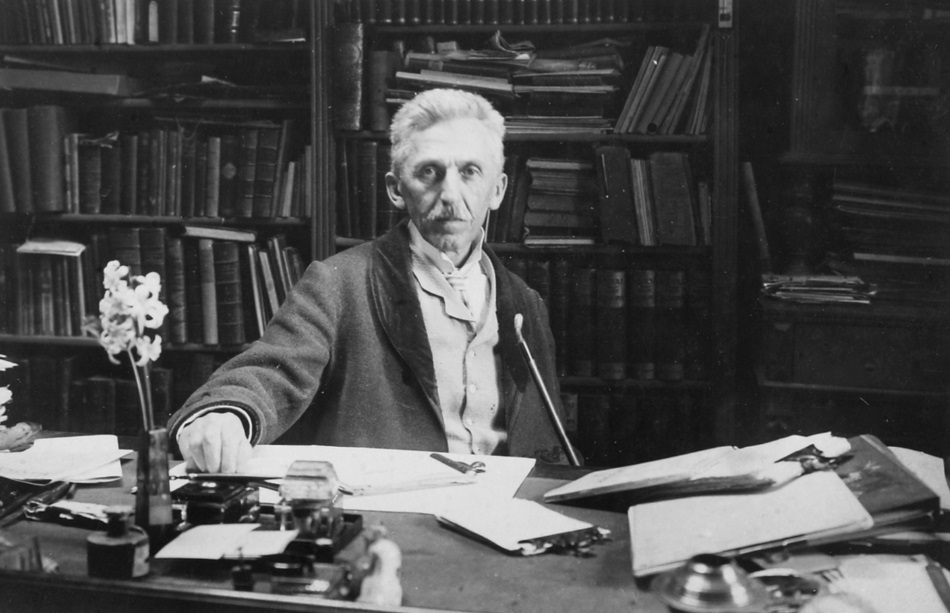
Géza Gárdonyi

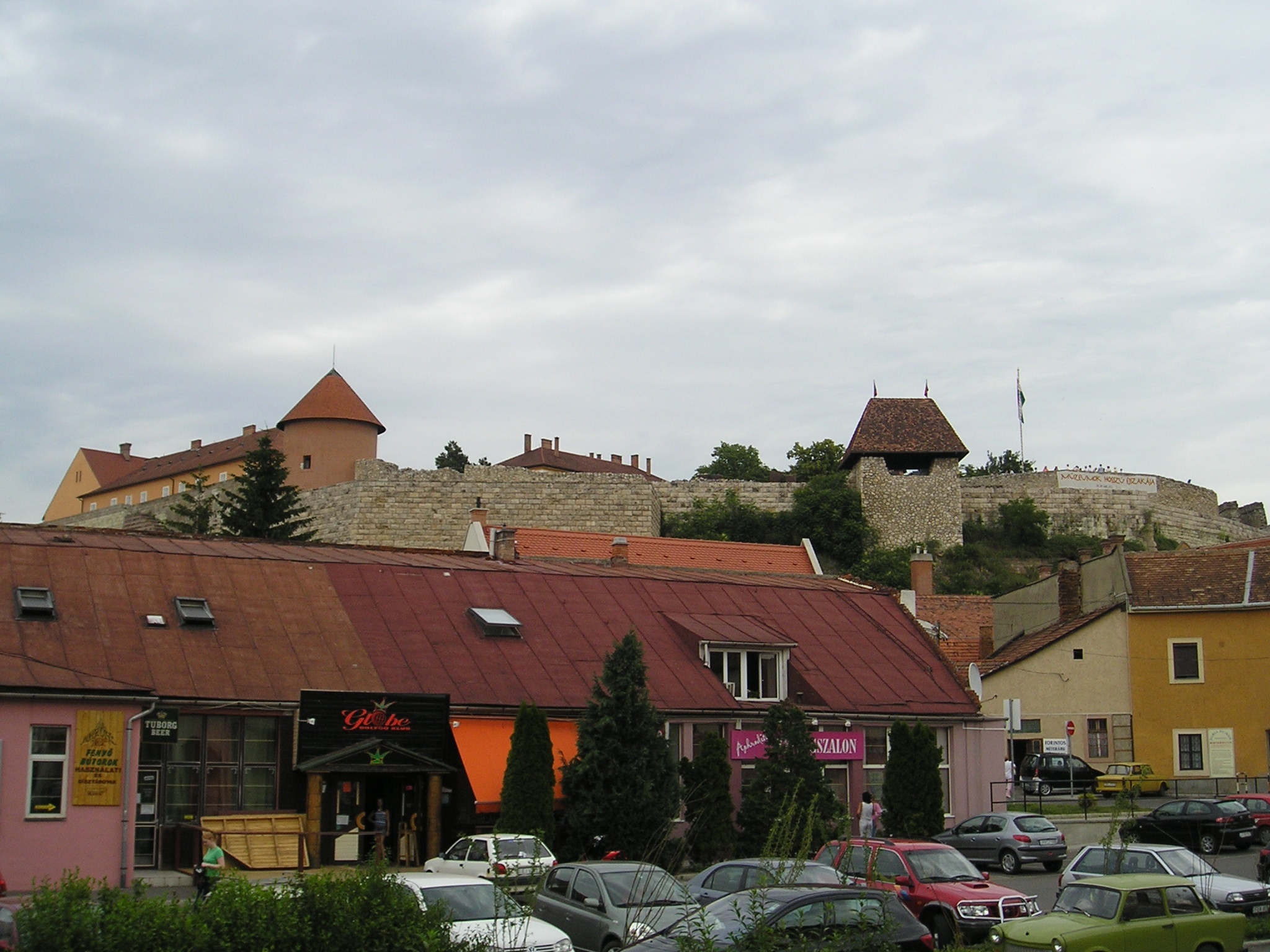
Eger Castle

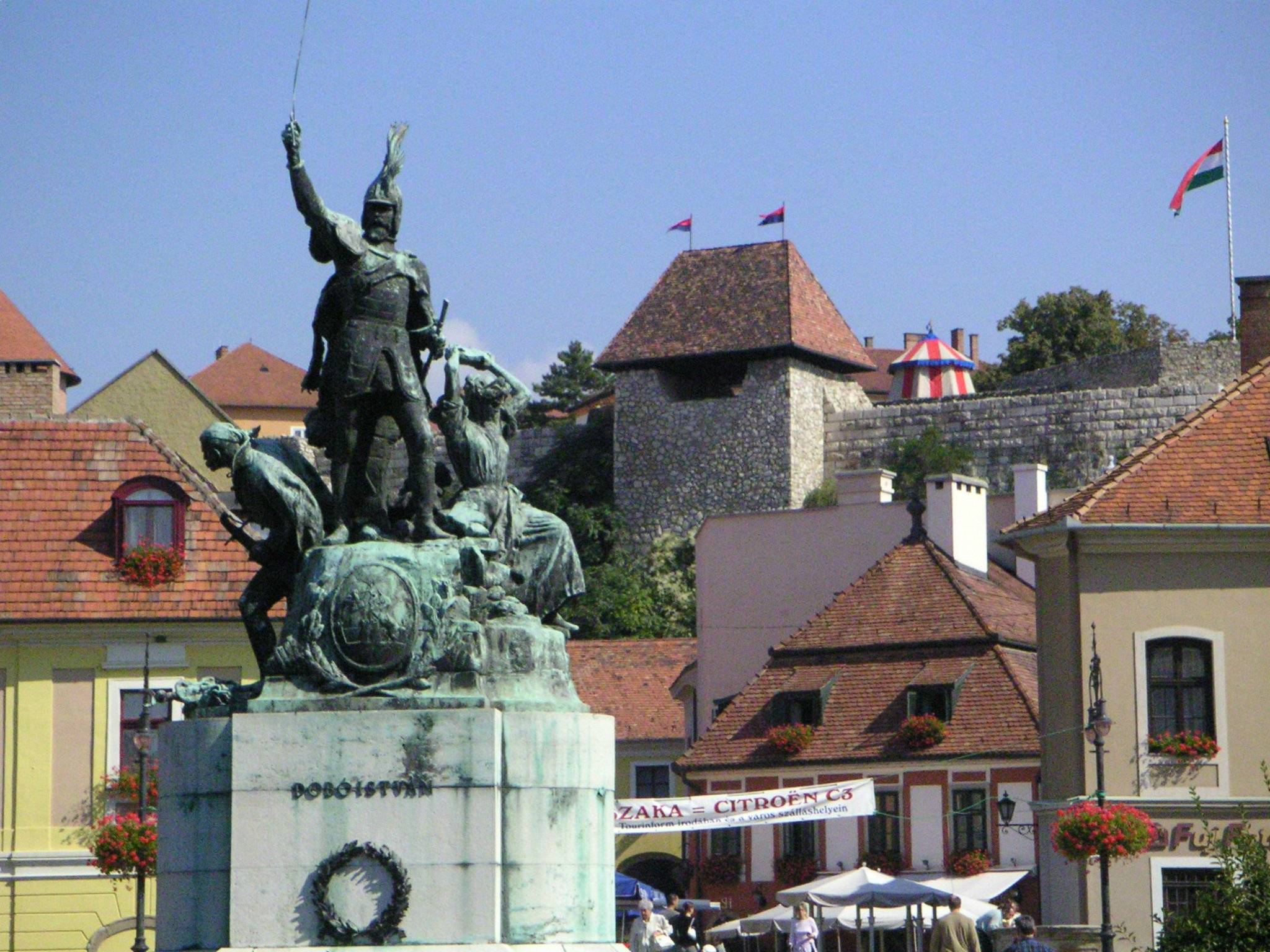
Statue of István Dobó in Eger. Made by Alajos Stróbl (1907)
