= AGON =

AGON (A.G.O.N.) Ancient Games Of Nations
- Developer: Private Moon Studios
- Designer: Pierrot (Tamás Z. Marosi)
- Platforms: Windows 2K/XP/Vista/Win7 macOS
- Release: 2003/2004 (episodes 1-3); 2007 (episode 4)
- Genre: Adventure
- Mode: Single-player

AGON is a series of episodic adventure games for Mac OS X and Microsoft Windows by Private Moon Studios. The game uses QuickTime VR-styled panoramas in a first-person camera mode. The game takes place starting in 1903.

== Gameplay ==
Screenshot visualizing the game interface

The player takes the role of Professor Samuel Hunt, a cultural historian at the British museum, and explores a 3D pre-rendered environment using a 360° field of view and moving between the various locations and interacting with objects and characters by clicking. In AGON, the cursor will change to indicate what actions players can take, ranging from arrows for movement to a cogwheel for using an object. The player has access to an on-screen dial which can open an inventory and access items; and open files allowing the player to view various documents located in the game. At the end of each episode, except episode 1, the player must face a computer-controlled character in a board game, and win in order to complete that episode. There is a slight discrepancy of the controls between the episodes; for example in Episode 4 the Files section records conversations, whilst documents are stored within the inventory.

== Plot ==
=== Overview ===
All games see Professor Samuel Hunt as the player character, an employee of the British Museum who searches the world for a collection of rare board games for the museum at the beginning of the 20th century. Each episode plays in a different part of the world. While each episode can be played independently, there is an overall plot connecting all episodes.

=== Episode 1 - London Scene ===
In 1903, Professor Samuel Hunt receives a mysterious letter and the first page of a Codex. The page makes references to a demonic 'Black King' and to several board games. The letter mentions the Black King is linked to an artifact in the museum. Hunt informs his close friend, Dr Thomas Smythe, about the artifact, and with Smythe's help, locates the artifact in the stores. Hidden in the artifact is a stone with coordinates and a name written on it, pinpointing a location in Lapland and a family named Vainio. Hunt decides to travel to the twelve locations mentioned in the codex, and find the games, leaving Smythe behind to find out what he can about the Codex.

=== Episode 2 - Adventures in Lapland ===
Arriving in Lapland, Professor Hunt has to find the last descendant of the Vainio family and the board game owned by the family. The story is told in the format of 'Acts', beginning with the player attempting to find a way to the nearby village. Secondly, he must gain the trust of the villagers to find Vainio's whereabouts. Thirdly, he has to find his way across the icy wastes beyond the river to Vainio's hut. The final act involves playing Vainio at the game of Tablut and winning.

=== Episode 3 - Pirates of Madagascar ===
The stone Vainio gave to Hunt takes him to Madagascar, searching for a certain Rakotonorivelo, who owns the next board game. However, Rakotonorivelo is the chief of the nearby village, and his treasure has been stolen by an English pirate, who is still on the island. Hunt has to find the pirate, and from him learn the location of the chief's hidden treasure, which is the chief's board game, Fanorona.

=== Episode 4 - The Lost Sword of Toledo ===
Whilst travelling to Toledo, Spain, Hunt receives a letter from Smythe informing him that the codex pages he has recovered in the previous episodes are fakes. He can do little but continue to Toledo, where he discovers the owner of the board game he is searching for, a young man known for his honesty, has been imprisoned on charges of theft of an ornamental sword. Hunt attempted to prove his innocence, and recover the lost sword to play Francisco Candelas at Alquerque.

=== Episode 5 - The Tale of the Four Dragons ===
A fifth episode was planned but was never released beyond a short demo version.

== Games ==
The episodes are available separately on download, and in anthology form on disc.

- The Mysterious Codex - Includes episodes 1–3.
- The Lost Sword of Toledo - Includes episode 4.
