= János Balassa =

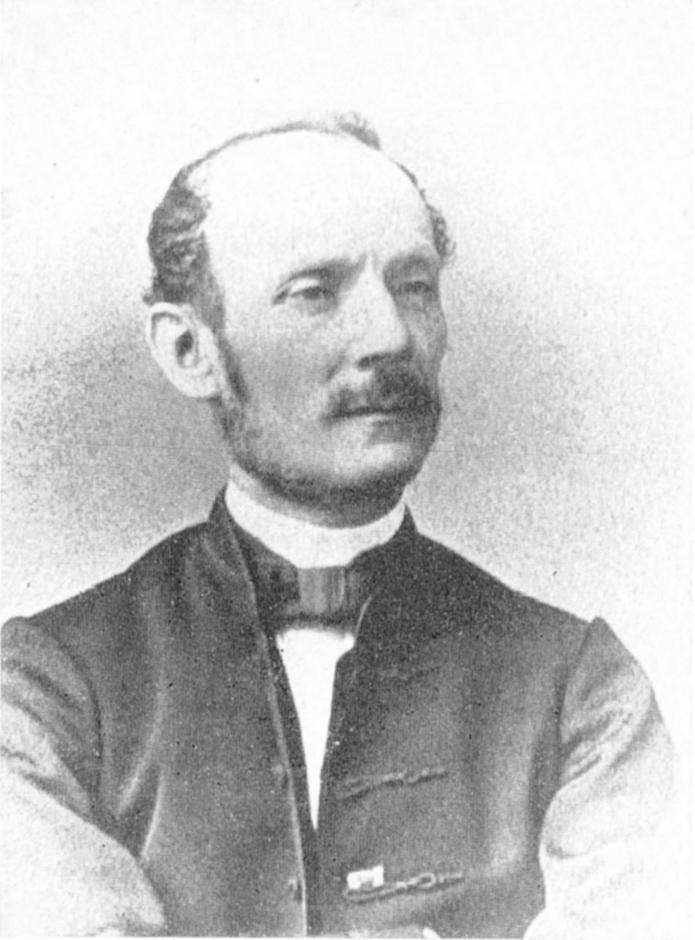
- János Balassa
- Born: 1814
- Died: 1868 (aged 53–54)
- Known for: Surgery, Cardiac resuscitation (CPR)

János Balassa (1815–1868) was a surgeon, university professor, and one of the leading personalities of the Hungarian medical society at the time. He was also an internationally recognized authority within the field of plastic surgery. Professor of Surgery (1843-) at the University of Pest (Hungary).

János Balassa was a pioneer of cardiac resuscitation (CPR) and carried out the first reported case of external heart massage.

In the aftermath of the failed Hungarian Revolution of 1848 where Hungary sought independence from the Austrian Empire, he was temporarily removed from his professorship and imprisoned by the Habsburg authorities.

Balassa was Ignaz Semmelweis's colleague and house doctor. He was in the medical commission that referred Semmelweis to a mental institution, other members were János Bókai and Wagner.

== Sources ==
- Benedek, István (1983a). Ignaz Phillip Semmelweis 1818-1865. Gyomaendrőd, Hungary: Corvina Kiadó (Translated from Hungarian to German by Brigitte Engel). ISBN 963-13-1459-6.
- Benedek, István (1983b). Semmelweis Krankheit. Budapest, Hungary: Akadémiai Kiadó (Translated from Hungarian to German by Alfred Falway). ISBN 963-05-3428-2.
- Carter, K. Codell; Barbara R. Carter (February 1, 2005). Childbed fever. A scientific biography of Ignaz Semmelweis. Transaction Publishers. ISBN 978-1-4128-0467-7.
