= Siege of Eger (1552) =

Part of the Habsburg-Ottoman war of 1551–1562

- Part of the Habsburg–Ottoman war of 1551–1562
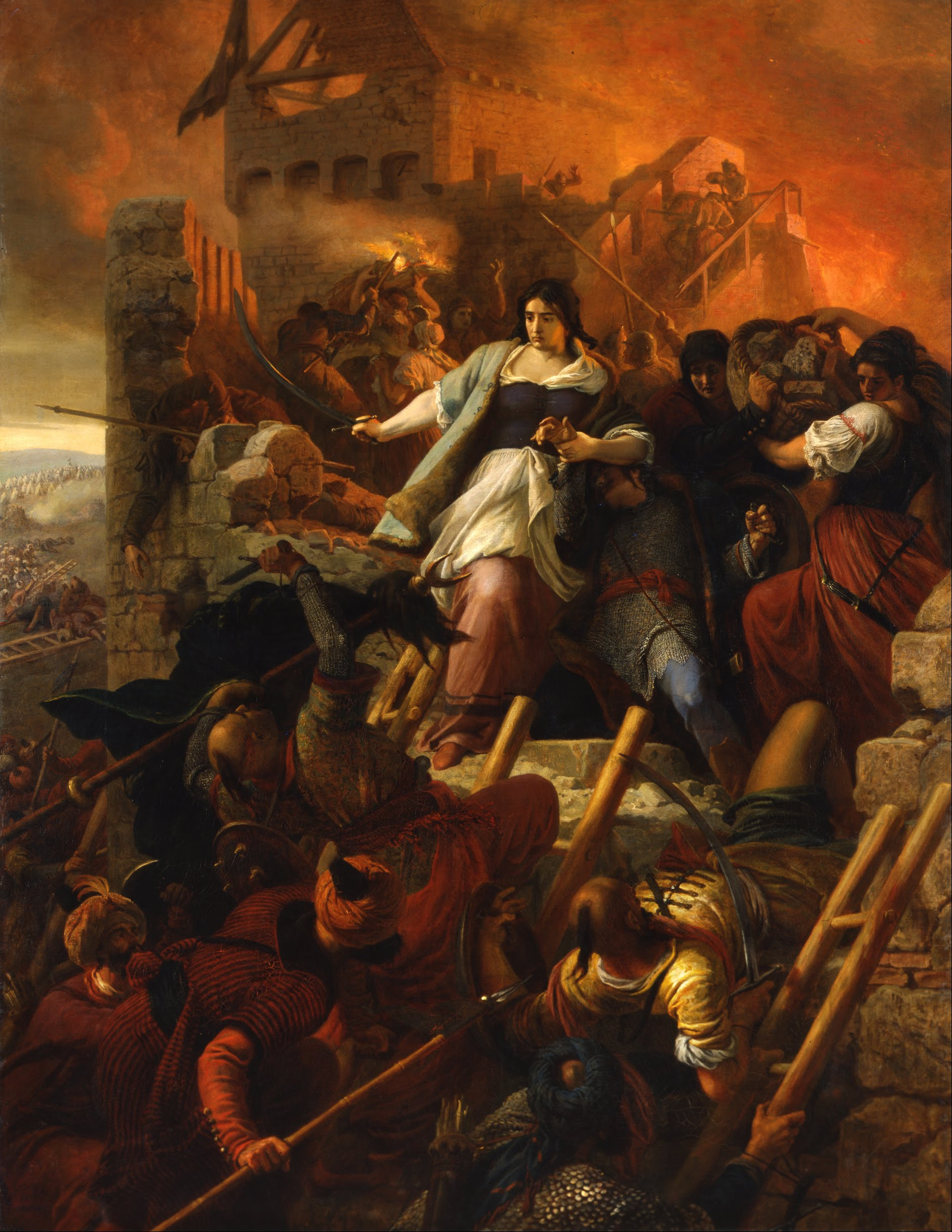
- The Women of Eger, Bertalan Székely
Date	9 September – 17 October 1552
Location	Eger, Northern Kingdom of Hungary 47°54′14.04″N 20°22′45.84″E
Result	Hungarian victory

Belligerents
Ottoman Empire	Hungarian defenders

Commanders and leaders
Ahmed Pasha; Hadım Ali Pasha of Buda; Sokollu Mehmed Pasha	István Dobó

Strength
Hungarian sources: 35,000–40,000 men (Gárdonyi's data: 150,000 and 200,000)	Hungarian sources: Approx. 2,100–2,300

Casualties and losses
"Heavy casualties"	400–600 dead

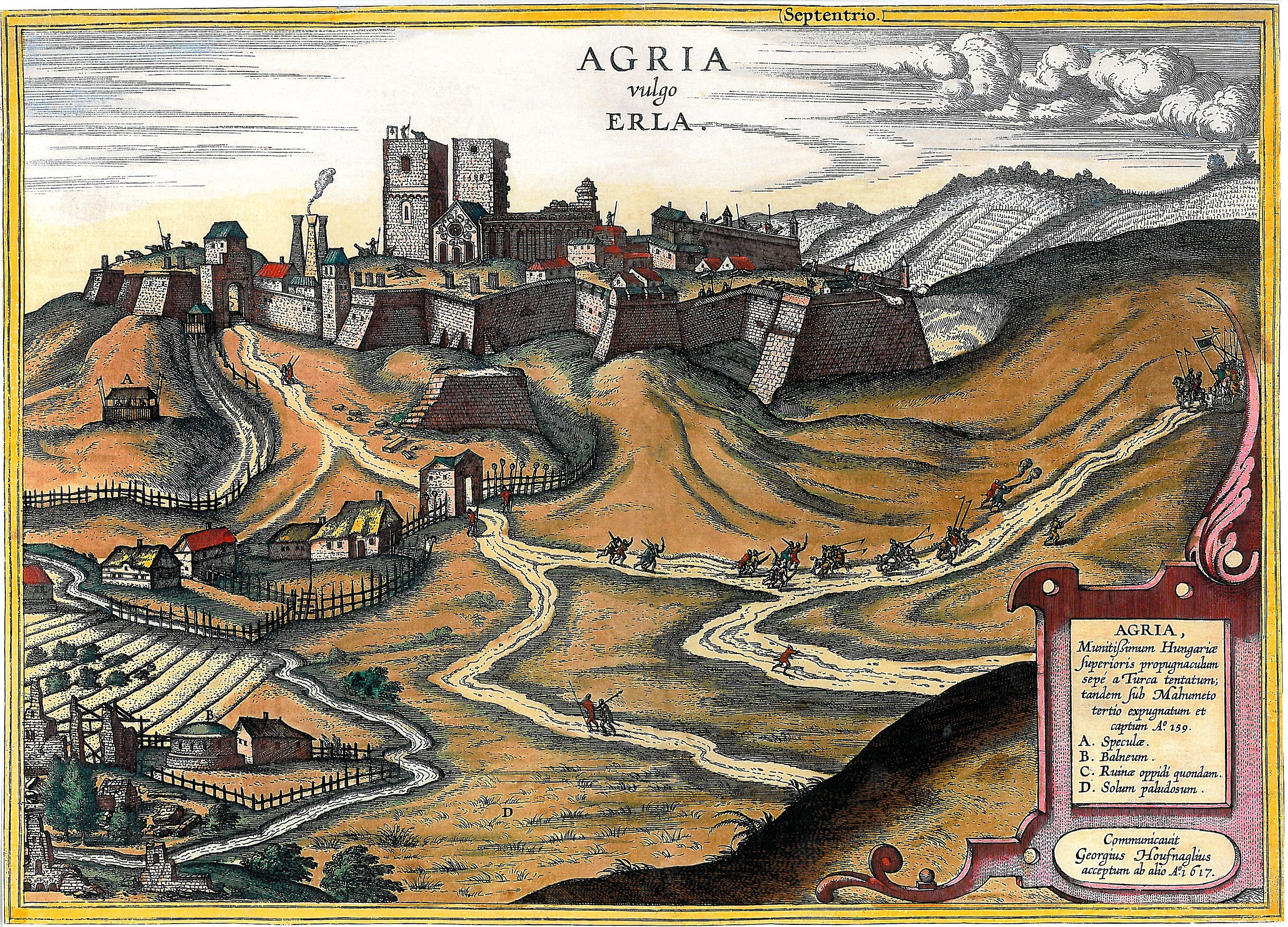
Eger Castle in the 16th century

Walls of Eger Castle

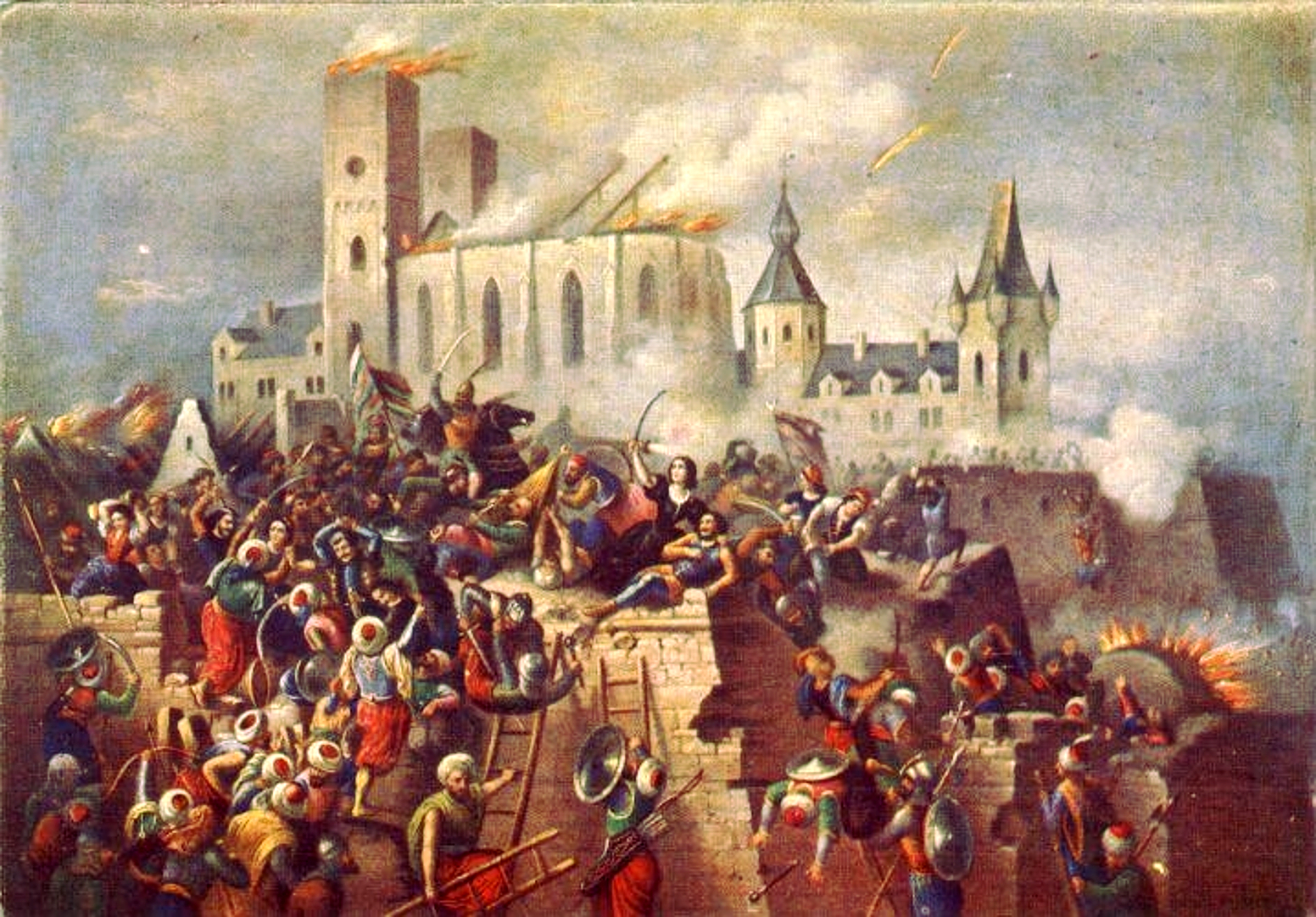
Siege of Eger Castle

The siege of Eger (Hungarian: Eger ostroma) occurred during the 16th century Ottoman wars in Europe. In 1552, the forces of the Ottoman Empire led by Kara Ahmed Pasha laid siege to the Castle of Eger, located in the northern part of the Kingdom of Hungary, but the defenders led by István Dobó repelled the attacks and defended the castle, despite being outnumbered approximately 17 to 1. The siege has become an emblem of national defense and patriotic heroism in Hungary.

== Background ==
Ottoman Sultan Suleiman the Magnificent commenced his expansion of the empire in 1520 after the reign of Selim I. He began assaults against Hungarian and Austrian-influenced territories, invading Hungarian soil in 1526. The Hungarian army was crushed at the Battle of Mohács and the way was paved for an attack on the Danube Basin. The battle also brought about the death of the King of Hungary and Bohemia, Louis II, leading to a disputed claim for the throne. Austrian Emperor Ferdinand I succeeded to the Bohemian throne but was challenged to the Hungarian throne by the pretender John Zápolya, whose claim was backed by nobles and the Sultan. The power struggle continued beyond John's death in 1540 when his son John II Sigismund Zápolya succeeded to the throne. It was not resolved until he renounced the throne in 1570, when he was succeeded by Maximilian I.

The Ottomans met resistance during the siege of Güns (Kőszeg) in 1532, where a force of 800 men under Nikola Jurišić managed to hold back the Ottoman armies. However, this only delayed their campaign by 25 days, and they continued to close in on Buda, finally occupying the capital in 1541. Buda became the seat of Ottoman rule in the area, with the Ottoman-supported John II governing the occupied territories.

The loss of Christian forts at Temesvár and Szolnok in 1552 were blamed on mercenary soldiers within the Hungarian ranks. When the Turks turned their attention to the northern Hungarian town of Eger in the same year, few expected the defenders to put up much resistance, particularly as the two great armies of the Ottoman lords Ahmed and Ali, which had crushed all opposition previously, united before Eger.

Eger was an important stronghold and key to the defense of the remainder of Hungarian soil. North of Eger lay the poorly reinforced city of Kassa (present-day Košice), the center of an important region of mines and associated mints, which provided the Hungarian kingdom with large amounts of quality silver and gold coinage. Besides allowing a takeover of that revenue source, the fall of Eger would also enable the Ottoman Empire to secure an alternate logistic and troop route for further westward military expansion, possibly allowing the Turks to lay sieges to Vienna more frequently.

== Castle ==
The Castle of Eger is located east of the town on a hillside. Its actual location was not ideal from a military point of view—it overlooks only the southern and western parts of the walled town—but it had the advantage over the Ottoman forces as it provided excellent locations for gun positions. The castle comprised an inner and outer fortress with a gate tower to the southeast and six bastions on the walls: the Earth Bastion and Prison Bastion to the northwest, Sándor Bastion on the north wall, Bolyky Bastion on the northeast corner, Bebek Bastion on the eastern corner of the outer fortress, and the Dobó Bastion on the western wall. The Varkoch gate sat on the southern wall of the inner fortress, while a further bastion, Church Bastion, lay at the center of the wall separating the two parts of the fortress.

The fortress of Eger was built on the ruins of an earlier stone fort, which replaced an ancient earthen encampment, possibly erected by the Huns. This made Eger's foundations stronger than usual and greatly hindered the work of Ottoman miners. As was usual during sieges at that time, both the attackers and the defenders tried to dig tunnels under the walls and plant gunpowder charges to either open gaps into the fortress or destroy the attacker's trenches. None of these attempts were successful during the siege of Eger.

== Siege ==
Old Hungarian data and Gárdonyi's estimate of the size of the Ottoman Army amount to 150–200,000 men. In reality, the Ottoman army numbered 35–40,000 men from the Rumelian army (and an Anatolian contingent) and the troops of Ahmed Pasha from Buda.

The Ottomans had 16 zarbuzans (very large siege cannons) as well as 150 medium and smaller pieces of artillery and 2,000 camels, which proved to be highly useful in the collection and transportation of wood to the site used for the construction of temporary siege platforms. The defenders had six large and about a dozen smaller cannons and about 300 trench guns with ample supplies of ammunition.

Despite the difference in troop numbers, Eger's strong walls and the high morale of its defenders allowed the fortress to withstand five major assaults and continuous cannon fire (excluding the ones stuck in the walls of the stronghold, almost 12,000 cannonballs landed inside the fortress before the siege ended).

The fortress was defended by 2,100-2,300 people, a mixture of professional soldiers, peasants, and a few dozen women. The defenders were commanded by István Dobó and his deputy István Mekcsey, who had assumed command in 1549. Among the approximately 1,530 combat-ready personnel there were only a handful of foreign mercenaries: Dobó had hired six cannonmasters from Germany in order to make the most efficient use of Eger's artillery. Another noted officer, famous in Hungarian literature and folklore, was Gergely Bornemissza. He commanded a detachment of 250 Hungarian infantry; however, it was his skill with explosives that was to make this young officer's name. During the siege, Bornemissza devised primitive but lethal grenades and powderkeg-sized bombs to use against the attackers as well as a water-mill wheel packed with gunpowder which he rolled into the Ottoman ranks. His secret lay in the gunpowder not simply exploding but sparking even more fire. He loaded these weapons with oil, sulfur, and flint in order to shower the enemy with burning missiles.

The Ottomans had expected an easy victory, but the bravery of the castle's defenders, as well as Dobó's inspired leadership, resulted in their repelling repeated Ottoman assaults. Even after the storage tower containing 24 metric tons of black gunpowder exploded and caused extensive structural damage, the invaders still could not find a way into the castle compound. After 39 days of bloody, brutal, and intense fighting the Ottoman Army withdrew, beaten and humiliated. The defenders' losses amounted to about one-third of their ranks, including those killed and permanently maimed in combat. Dobó lost both of his squires.

According to modern historical research, several external factors contributed to the defenders' success. There was significant in-fighting between the two Ottoman leaders, Pasha Ali and Pasha Ahmed. Ahmed was the senior and contributed twice as many troops to the united army, but Ali showed more strategic talent and proved his skill in artillery, badly damaging the castle walls with his battery of just four large siege guns. During the siege, the Ottoman army ran out of gunpowder and cannonballs (which were carved out of marble) at least twice, limiting Ahmed's use of heavy artillery for a week or more. The end of autumn arrived earlier than usual with heavy rain and freezing nighttime temperatures. Reduced rice rations and allegations of corruption among the officers caused discontent among the Ottoman troops. Despite the failure at Eger, the Ottomans had no reason to lament the campaign of 1552, for they had taken Veszprém, Temesvár, Szolnok, and Lippa, as well as some 25 Hungarian strongholds.

After the victory Dobó and his officers resigned, in order to protest King Ferdinand's refusal to contribute any material help to the defense. Gergely Bornemissza was appointed to take over command of the fortress. He was later ambushed, captured, and hanged by the Ottomans. The fortress of Eger remained defiant of Ottoman attacks until 1596 when 7,000 defenders, mostly foreign mercenaries, capitulated to Ottoman forces personally commanded by the Sultan, Mehmed III. The town remained in Ottoman hands for 91 years.

Eger has become an emblem of national defense, a symbol of patriotic heroism and the superiority of a national army over an unmotivated foreign mercenary force.

== In art and literature ==
Earliest records of the siege were recorded by the chronicler Sebestyén Tinódi Lantos in 1553 who wrote musical verses of the exploits of the people of Eger.

It was not until the 19th century that the siege was seized upon by Hungarian writers as the basis of fictional accounts. The first was the poem Eger by Mihály Vörösmarty in 1827.

The most famous account was by author Géza Gárdonyi who wrote his popular 1899 historical novel Egri csillagok about the events of this period. It chronicles the events leading up to and including the siege and tells the tale of Gergely Bornemissza, as well as Captain Dobó, and his co-commander István Mekcsey. The novel was adapted for film twice, premiered in 1923 and 1968 respectively, the latter of which is still regularly shown on Hungarian television.

Bertalan Székely's painting Az Egri Nők (Women of Eger) depicts the defense of the fortress, especially by the womenfolk, and hangs in the Hungarian National Gallery in Budapest.
