= Sebestyén Tinódi Lantos =

Hungarian poet (c. 1510–1556)

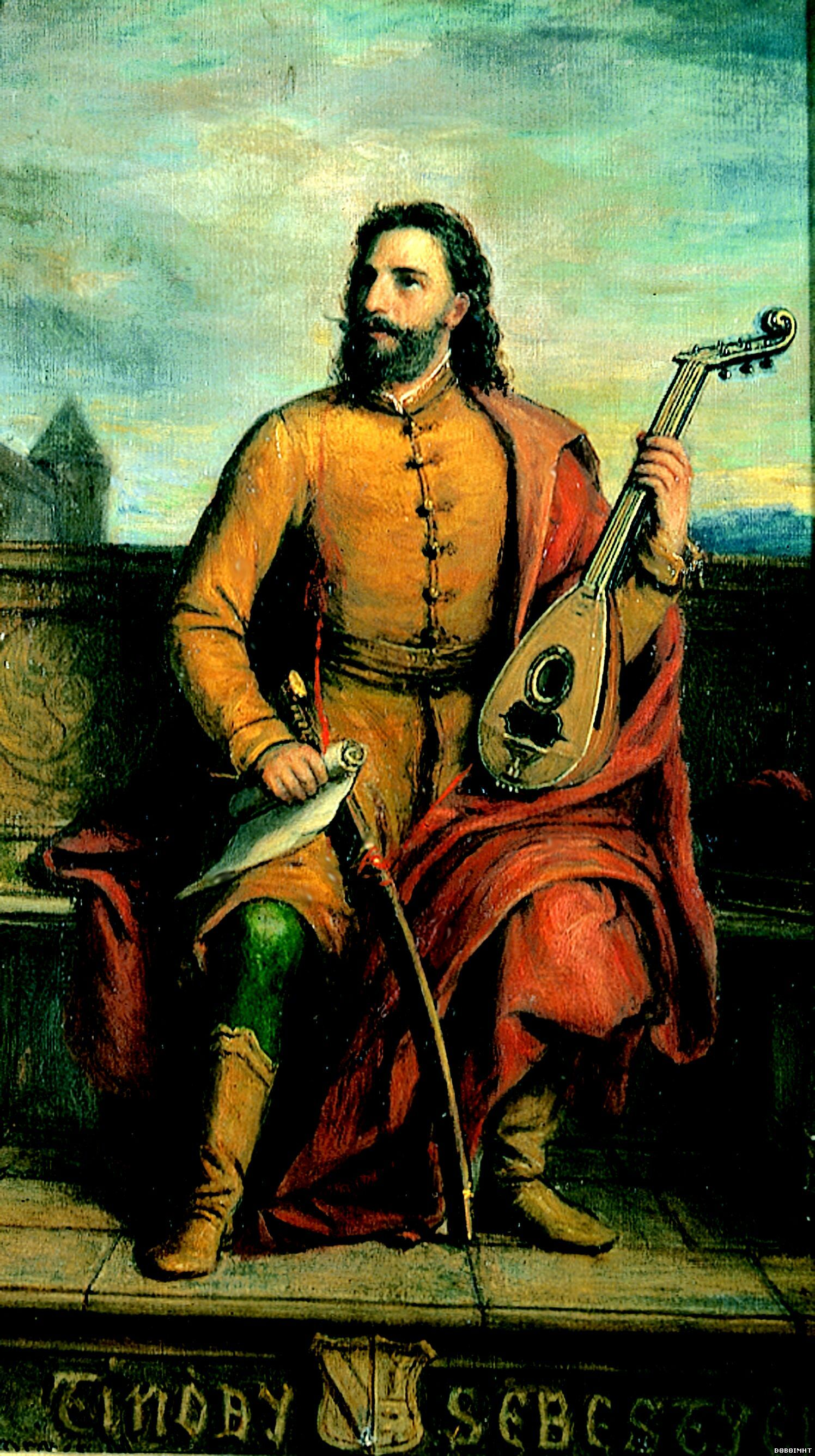
Sebestyén Tinódi Lantos

Sebestyén Tinódi Lantos (c. 1510 in Tinód – 30 January 1556 in Sárvár) was a 16th-century Hungarian lyricist, epic poet, political historian, and minstrel.

== Biography ==
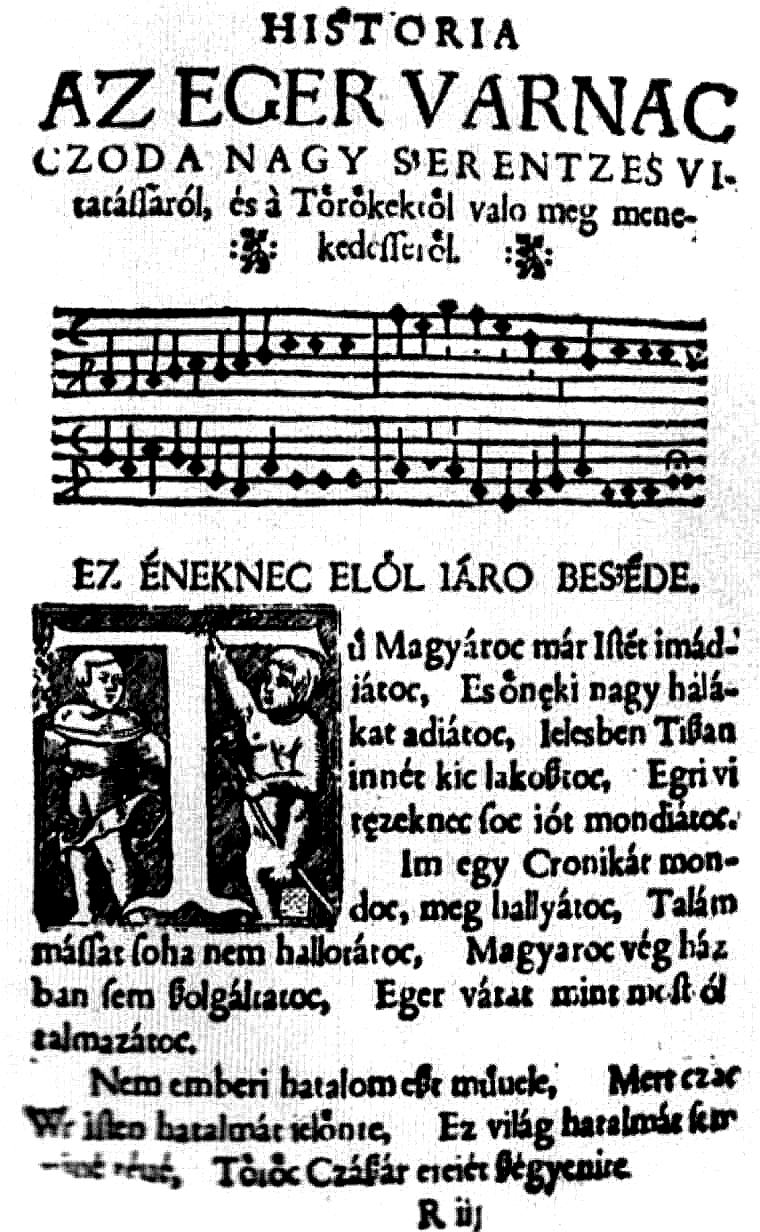
Tinódi's chronicles about the Siege of Eger (1552)

Little is known about Tinódi's childhood. He attended various schools and studied Latin, and excelled at sheet music. He joined the military service in 1535 and in 1539 was wounded in a battle, which rendered him ineligible for further military service. In 1541, when Turks invaded, it made a big impression on him. He became a political poet at this time, his works expressing the need to resist the Turks.

Tinódi started a family, and visited parliament and scenes of battles, and wrote poems about these. He then began to put his poems to music and performed them to the accompaniment of a lute, which led to his nickname, "Lantos" - the lute-player. His songs became recognized as an important chronicalization of the events of the day by Tamás Nádasdy in 1545, who recommended to Parliament that this become a public post for Tinódi. From 1546 to 1551 there was a general period of peace, but in 1552 a new Ottoman military campaign began, and this was again chronicled by Tinódi.

In 1553, he was formally recognized by the king as a chronicler who processed the historical events of his age in a poem form, and was conferred the patent of nobility. The collected edition of his works was published in 1554. He traveled to Transylvania for a while and returned in 1555, but died shortly thereafter.

== Works ==
- Chronica, Kolozsvar, 1554
