= Ganxsta Zolee =

Hungarian musician and actor

Ganxsta ("Döglégy") Zolee (birthname Zoltán Zana, nickname means Blowfly) is a Hungarian musician and actor.

== Biography ==
Zoltán Zana was born in Budapest in 1966.

== Discography ==
=== with Sex Action ===
- Sex Action (1990)
- Olcsó élvezet (1992)
- Mocskos élet (1993)
- Jöhet bármi (2005)

=== with Action ===
- Összeomlás (1994)
- Terror (1995)
- Sexact!on (1997)

=== Ganxsta Zolee and Kartel ===
- Egyenesen a gettóból (1995)
- Jégre teszlek (1997)
- Helldorado (1999)
- Rosszfiúk (2000)
- Pokoli lecke (2001)
- Gyilkosság Rt. (2002)
- Greatest sHit (2003)
- Szabad a gazda (2004)
- Jubileumi album (2005)
- Isten, Család, Sör (2007)
- Amikor már azt hitted, hogy vége (2009)
- Hatalmat a népnek (2012)
- 20 év, Tribute lemez (2015)
- K.O. (2017)
- Helldorado Újratöltve (2018)
- OldSkool (2019)

=== Jack Jack ===
- Jack Jack - The Band (2008)

=== EPs ===
- Fehér hó (1996)
- Argentin tangó (1998)
- Isten, Család, Sör (2007)

=== Singles ===
- A Jó a Rossz és a Kartel (Promo)
- A való világ
- Blow-Feld vs. O.J. Bond
- Néhány jó dolog
- Vato Loco
- Mi vagyunk azok
- H-O-K-I (Promo)
- Route 66
- Gerilla Funk
- Hasfalmetszők (1999)
- Nekem lámpást adott kezembe az Úr, Pesten (1999)
- Kiképzés - szinkronhang

== Screen roles ==
- Jóban Rosszban (2008) 2 episodes (863. és 864. rész) - as himself
- Madagascar 2 (2008) – Moto Moto, voice-over
