= Eger Castle =

Castle in Eger, Hungary

Coordinates: 47.9039°N 20.3794°E

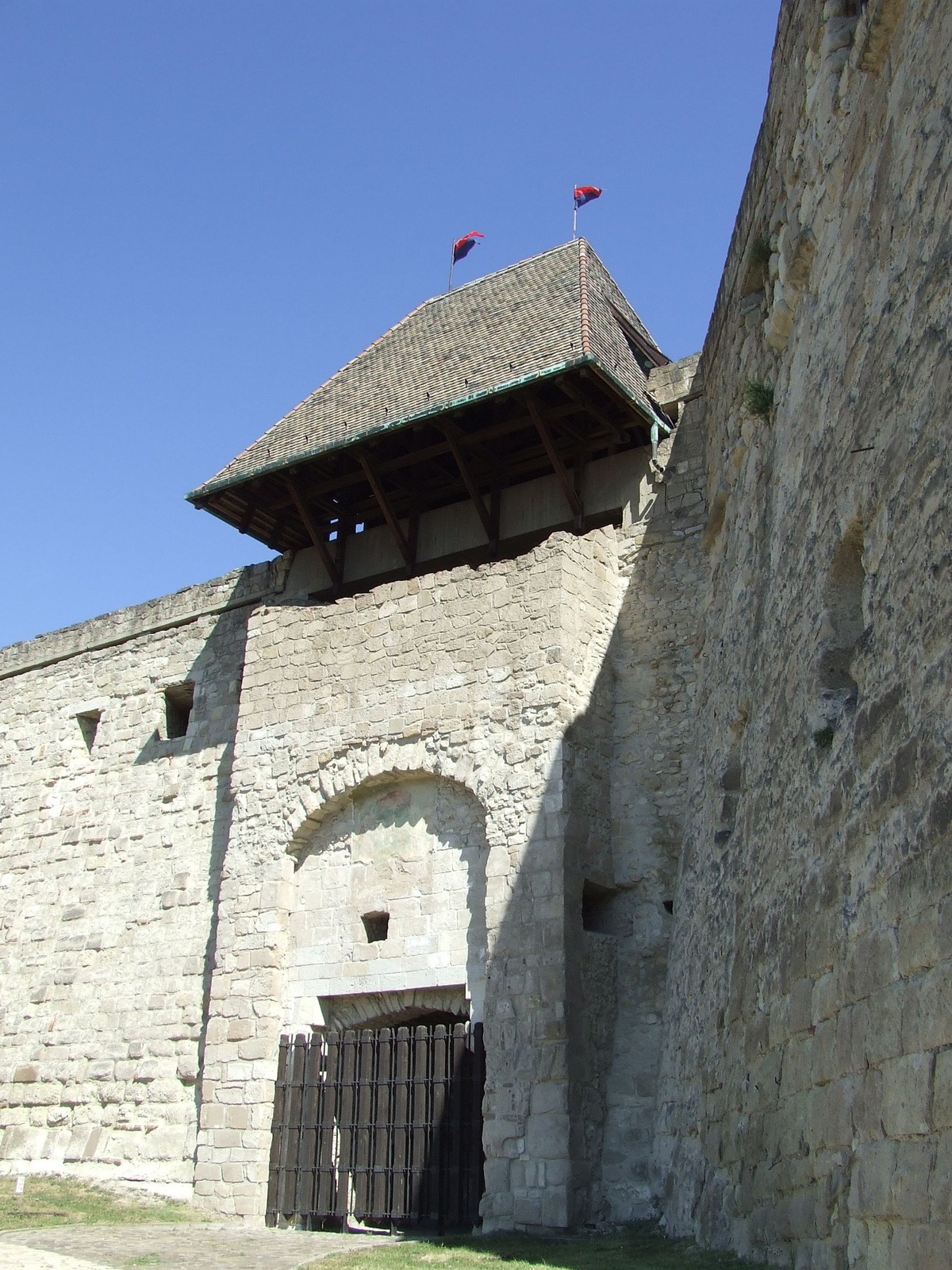
An entrance of the Eger Castle

Eger Castle Walls

The Eger Castle (Hungarian: Egri vár) is a castle in Eger, Hungary. Historically, it is known for repelling the Turkish attack in 1552 during the Siege of Eger.

== History ==
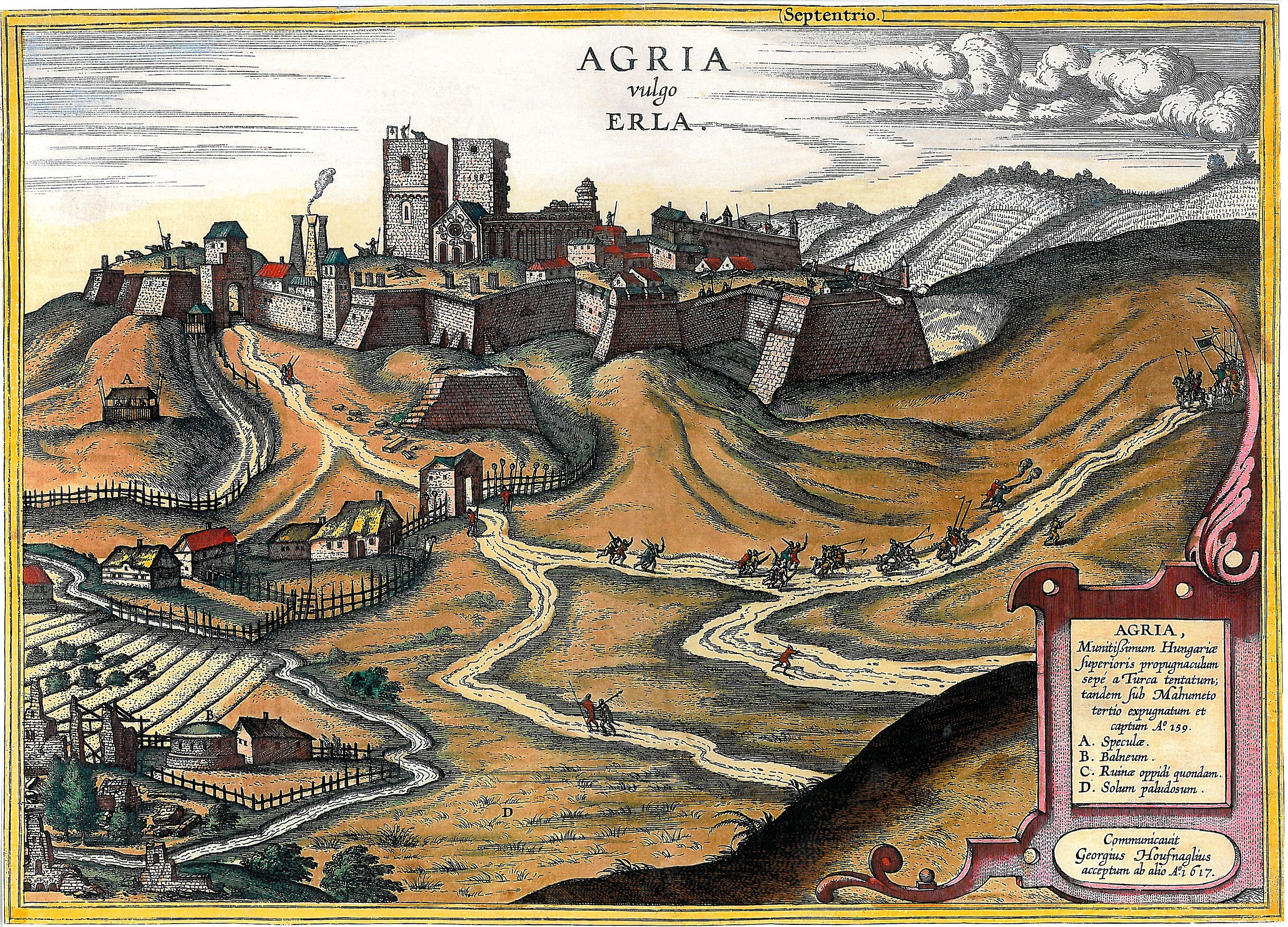
The Eger Castle on Georg Hoefnagel's map

The first castle was built on the high hill named Várhegy at Felsőtárkány near Eger.

During the Mongol invasion in 1241, this castle was ruined, and the bishop of Eger moved it to a rocky hill in the city of Eger. On the hill, a new castle was built, and it developed rapidly. In 1470 a Gothic palace was built. In 1552, a Turkish army of 35,000-40,000 soldiers attacked the castle which had 2,100-2,300 defenders. The siege failed as the Turks suffered heavy casualties. A total of 1,700 of the defenders survived. After that Turks besieged the castle again in 1596, resulting in a Turkish victory. In 1701, the Austrians exploded half of the castle (the Külső vár).

Archaeological excavations only started in 1925 and the castle was used by the army as barracks until 1957.

== Museums ==
There are several museums in the castle:

- Dobó István Vármúzeum - This shows the history of the castle,
- Egri Képtár - A painting exhibition,
- Kazamaták - A system of cellars under the castle,
- Panoptikum - A wax museum,
- an ancient vase exhibition,

and several periodic exhibitions.
