= Géza Gárdonyi =

Hungarian writer and journalist

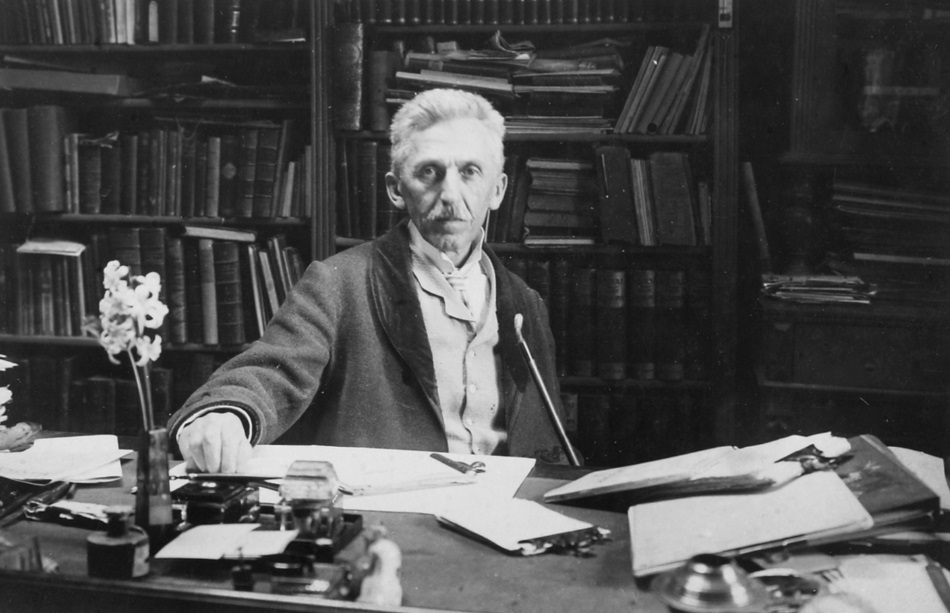
- Gárdonyi in 1921
- Born: Géza Ziegler; 3 August 1863; Agárdpuszta, Kingdom of Hungary, Austrian Empire
- Died: 30 October 1922 (aged 59); Eger, Hungary
- Resting place: Eger Castle, Eger, Hungary
- Education: Archiepiscopal Teacher Training College of Eger (1878–1882)
- Occupations: Novelist, poet, playwright, journalist, educator
- Spouse: Mária Csányi 1885 (m. 1907, divorced)
- Children: 4 (including József Gárdonyi)
- Writing career
- Pen name: Don Vigole; Göre Gábor; Róbert Mummery; Sándor Nemeskéry
- Language: Hungarian
- Years active: 1879–1922
- Genres: Historical novel, psychological novel, short story, folk drama, lyric poetry
- Notable works: Egri csillagok (1901); Láthatatlan ember (1902); Isten rabjai (1908)
- Movements: Realism, New Populism, Art Nouveau

Géza Gárdonyi, born Géza Ziegler (3 August 1863 – 30 October 1922) was a Hungarian writer and journalist. Although he wrote a range of works, he had his greatest success as a historical novelist, particularly with Eclipse of the Crescent Moon and Slave of the Huns.

== Life ==
Gárdonyi was born in Agárdpuszta, Kingdom of Hungary, the son of a machinist on the estate of an aristocrat in Western Hungary. He graduated from at a college for teachers and worked for some years as a teacher and Catholic cantor. He married Mária Molnár in 1885, but their marriage was unhappy, and they separated in 1892.

Gárdonyi's career as a writer started off when he began writing for magazines and newspapers in the mid-1880s. His first successes were the satirical "Göre Gábor" letters on rural life, works which he later repudiated. Around the turn of the century, he started to tackle historical themes in writing, which resulted in a series of fine novels.

He moved to Eger (today's northern Hungary) in 1897 with his mother and lived there until his death. He is also buried there, with his tomb bearing the inscription Csak a teste ("Only his body"). The house where he lived and did most of his writing is now preserved as a museum.

== Best known work ==
=== The Stars of Eger or Eclipse of the Crescent Moon ===
Gárdonyi's most famous novel Egri csillagok was published in 1899. The title translates literally as Stars of Eger, but it has been published in English as Eclipse of the Crescent Moon and as The Stars of Eger (by T. László Palotás, 2022, ISBN 979-8829947033). It is set around a famous siege of the town of Eger in Hungary by the Ottomans in the year 1552. In 2005 this book was voted "the most popular novel of Hungary" by viewers of the television programme Big Read (A Nagy Könyv).

=== Slave of the Huns ===
In the opinion of some people, his best work was A láthatatlan ember, published in 1901. The title translates literally as The Invisible Man, but it was published in English as Slave of the Huns and as Hidden among the Huns (by T. László Palotás, 2022, ISBN 979-8829978860). It is set around the time of Attila the Hun.

Although these two novels are very well known in Hungary, translations into English and other European languages only became widely published in the late 20th century.

== Works ==
- Egri csillagok (Stars of Eger / Eclipse of the Crescent Moon)
- A láthatatlan ember (The Invisible Man / Slave of the Huns / Hidden among the Huns)
- Isten Rabjai (Captives of God)
- A lámpás (The Lamp)
- A bor (The Wine)
- Ida regénye (Ida's Novel, adapted to the film Romance of Ida)
- Hosszúhajú veszedelem (The Menace with Long Hair)
- Az én falum (My Village)
- Az égre néző lélek (Spirit, Looking at the Sky)
- Állatmesék (Animal Tales)

== See also ==
- List of Hungarian writers
