= Egerszólát =

Village in Heves, Hungary

Coordinates: 47°52′59″N 20°16′01″E

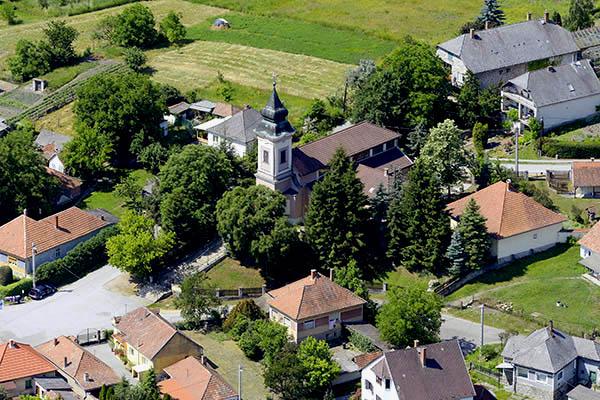
Egerszólát

Egerszólát is a village in Heves county, in the north-eastern part of Hungary, west of Eger. It is located in Eger wine region and is famous in Hungary for its white wine called 'Egerszóláti Olaszrizling'. As of 2015, it has a population of 1,000.
