= Archbishop's Garden =

Park in Eger, Hungary

Coordinates: 47.8969°N 20.3803°E

Érsekkert
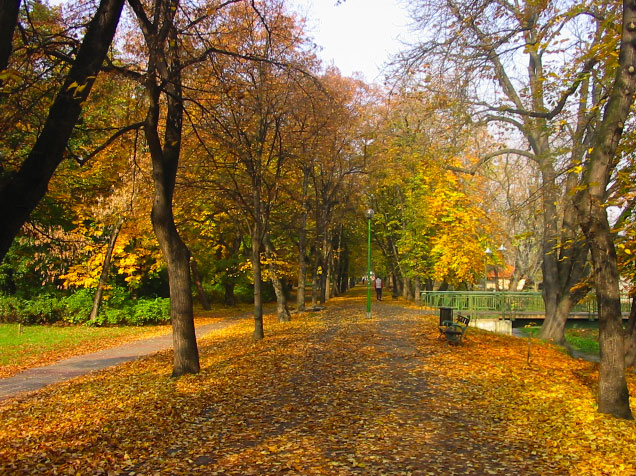
- Interactive map of Érsekkert
- Location: Eger
- Area: 0.12
- Open: 0-24
- Status: open all year

Archbishop's Garden (Hungarian:Érsekkert or colloquially Népkert) is a park in Eger, Hungary, that covers about 12 hectares.

== History ==
It was created on the area of a former hunting ground. The park walls were built by Bishop Esterházy. Some of these walls are still standing on the northern and western side of the park.

The park was opened to the public in 1919.

== Sights ==
- The fountain (built in 2000)
- The sports facilities (football pitches, tennis courts)
- The artificial lake with a bridge.
