= Nyilas-már =

Grand Superior terroir in the village of Noszvaj which is located in the Eger wine region, in Central Europe, Hungary. The Eger region has a cooler climate, which is similar to Burgundy or to the Northern Rhône wine regions. The continental climate and diverse soils make it capable of producing both red and white varietals.

== The terroir ==
This terroir consists mainly of granite and volcanic soils with south-southwesterly exposure. Blessed with a unique microclimate due to Lake Bogács, this site has soils rich in minerals that result in distinctive, fresh and fruity wines.

The Nyilas-már terroir is almost exclusively in the possession of the Kovács NImród Winery (KNW). KNW has 8 hectares (20 acres) in Nyilas-már.

Varietals of the terroir include: Chardonnay, Pinot Gris, Pinot Noir, Syrah and Kékfrankos.
