= Nagy-Eged Hill =

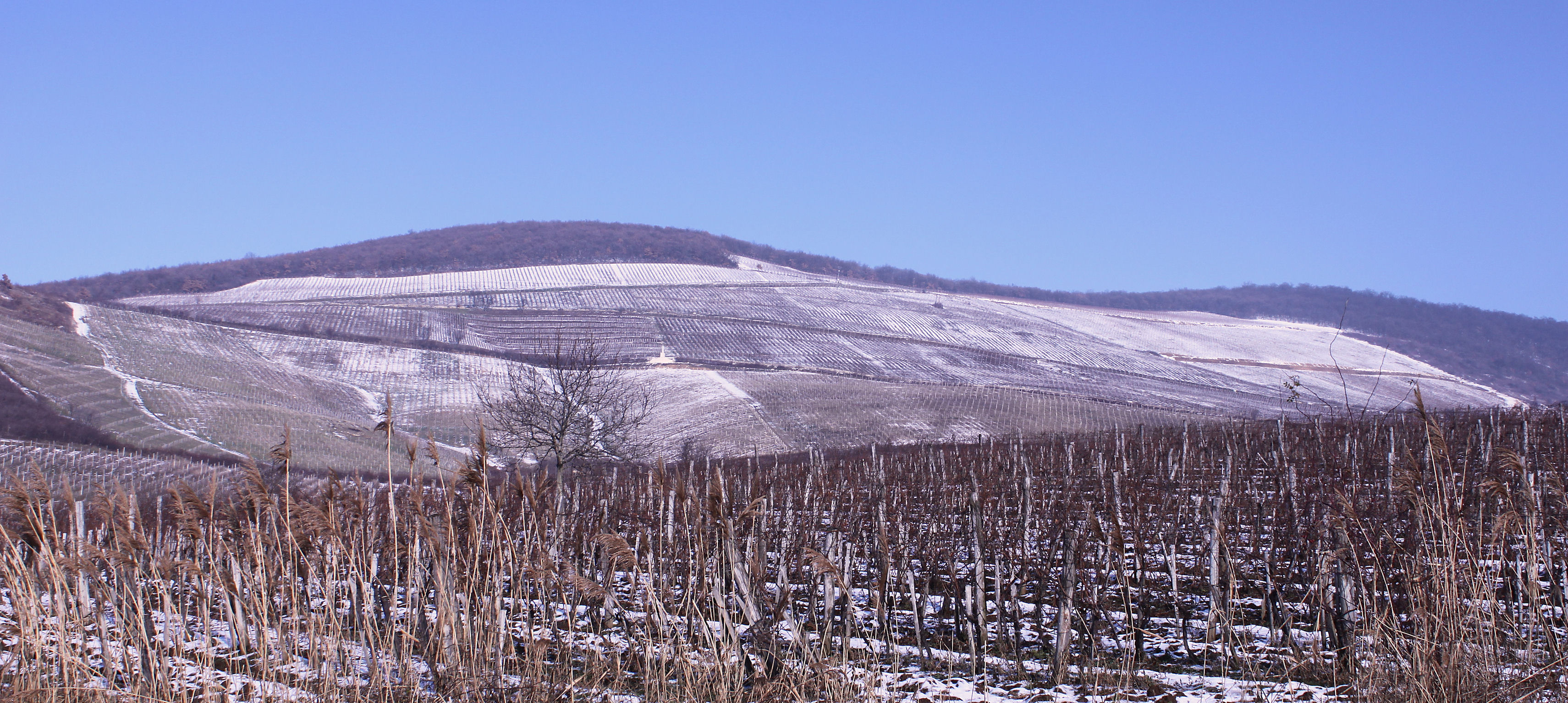
The hill in winter

The Nagy-Eged Hill (which is located in the Eger Wine Region in Central Europe, Hungary) is an emblematic wine producing site. It is Hungary’s highest altitude terroir. Based on its unique location, soil composition and climate, it is the most valuable terroir in the region. It is Eger’s Grand Cru terroir.

== Location ==
The most important terroir of the Eger Wine Region is the Nagy-Eged Hill (in English Great Eged Hill), which is located in the southern foothills of the Bükk Mountains. Its peak is at 536 meters. Unlike the major part of the Wine Region, its soil is not rhyolite, but gray Triassic-limestone with calcareous based sediments.

The Eged Hill ridge lies in the south-west to north-east. The lower parts are called the Nagy-Eged terroir (Nagy-Eged-dűlő); the upper part is called the Nagy-Eged Hill terroir (Nagy-Eged-hegy-dűlő). The former is up to cca 250 meters of altitude, and almost completely occupies the southwest side of the hill. The best performing terroir, the Nagy-Eged Hill is above 250 meters, at the steepest parts terraces were formed.

== Climate and soil ==
The Eger Wine Region has a cooler climate, which is similar to Burgundy or to the Northern Rhône wine regions. As a result of the continental climate and diverse soil composition it is possible to produce both red and white varietals.

The Eged Hill is the place where the warmth of the Plains meets the cool air of the Bükk Mountains, forming a special microclimate. Due to its exposure and the slope angle of the hill, spring comes early. The surface helps the dispersion of the sun rays and increases the heat both in the air and the soil. Due to the specific climate and environment many rare plants and animal species can be found here.

The most typical soil is the rendzina (a dark, grayish-brown, humus-rich, intrazonal soil) and the brown forest soil.

Annual average temperatures: 10 degrees Celsius (in the vegetation season: 17 °C; the temperature goes above 25 °C more than a hundred days a year)

Total annual sunshine: 2100 hours

Annual rainfall: 540–550 mm. The rain runs smoothly down the mountain because the shallow, dry soil does not absorb much water. As a result, many sub-Mediterranean species live here.

== The effect of the terroir on the grapes ==
The Nagy-Eged Hill is a Grand Cru terroir, where premium Grand Superior wines are produced.

The surface of the soil is almost perpendicular to the arriving rays of the sun; part of these rays are reflected back from the white or gray limestone rocks, thus the near-surface air is extremely hot, which ensures the optimum ripening of the grapes. In the marl dotted soil of the limestone mountains, the roots of the vine stretch down to 10 meters trying to find water. The gray limestone subsoil contributes to the delicate acid structure of the wines as well as to its longevity.

== Wineries in the Nagy-Eged Hill ==
=== Gróf Buttler Winery ===
The winery started in 2001 to revive the 18-hectare area of the emblematic, yet completely neglected, weedy habitat. First, they built a two-kilometer-long wall, and in April 2003, they started the plantation.

Grape Varieties: Viognier, Pinot blanc, Chardonnay, Kadarka, Kékfrankos, Syrah, Merlot, Pinot noir, Cabernet Franc, Cabernet Sauvignon

=== Kovács Nimród Winery ===
Kovács Nimród Winery has a 10 hectare vineyard lying on the top right corner of the Nagy-Eged Hill. They planted the vines in 2005. Their Grand Cru wines come from this terroir.

Grape Varieties: Furmint, Kékfrankos, Pinot noir, Syrah, Cabernet Franc, Merlot

=== St. Andrea Winery ===
St. Andrea Winery owns 4 hectares in the lower part of the Nagy-Eged Hill.

Grape varieties: Hárslevelű, Sauvignon blanc, Kékfrankos, Merlot, Cabernet Franc
