= Nagyfai =

Grand Superior terroir in the village of Noszvaj which is located in the Eger wine region, in Central Europe, Hungary. The Eger region has a cooler climate, which is similar to Burgundy or to the Northern Rhône wine regions. The continental climate and diverse soils make it capable of producing both red and white varietals.

== The terroir ==
The terroir consist of gently sloping forest soils interspersed with volcanic rocks. This site produces well balanced and well-rounded wines.

The Nagyfai terroir is almost exclusively in the possession of Kovács Nimród Winery (KNW). KNW has 12 hectares (30 acres) in Nagyfai.

Varietals of the terroir include: Pinot Gris, Chardonnay, Pinot Noir, Syrah, Kékfrankos, Merlot and Cabernet Franc.
