= Eger =

City with county rights in Heves, Hungary

- City with county rights
- Eger Megyei Jogú Város
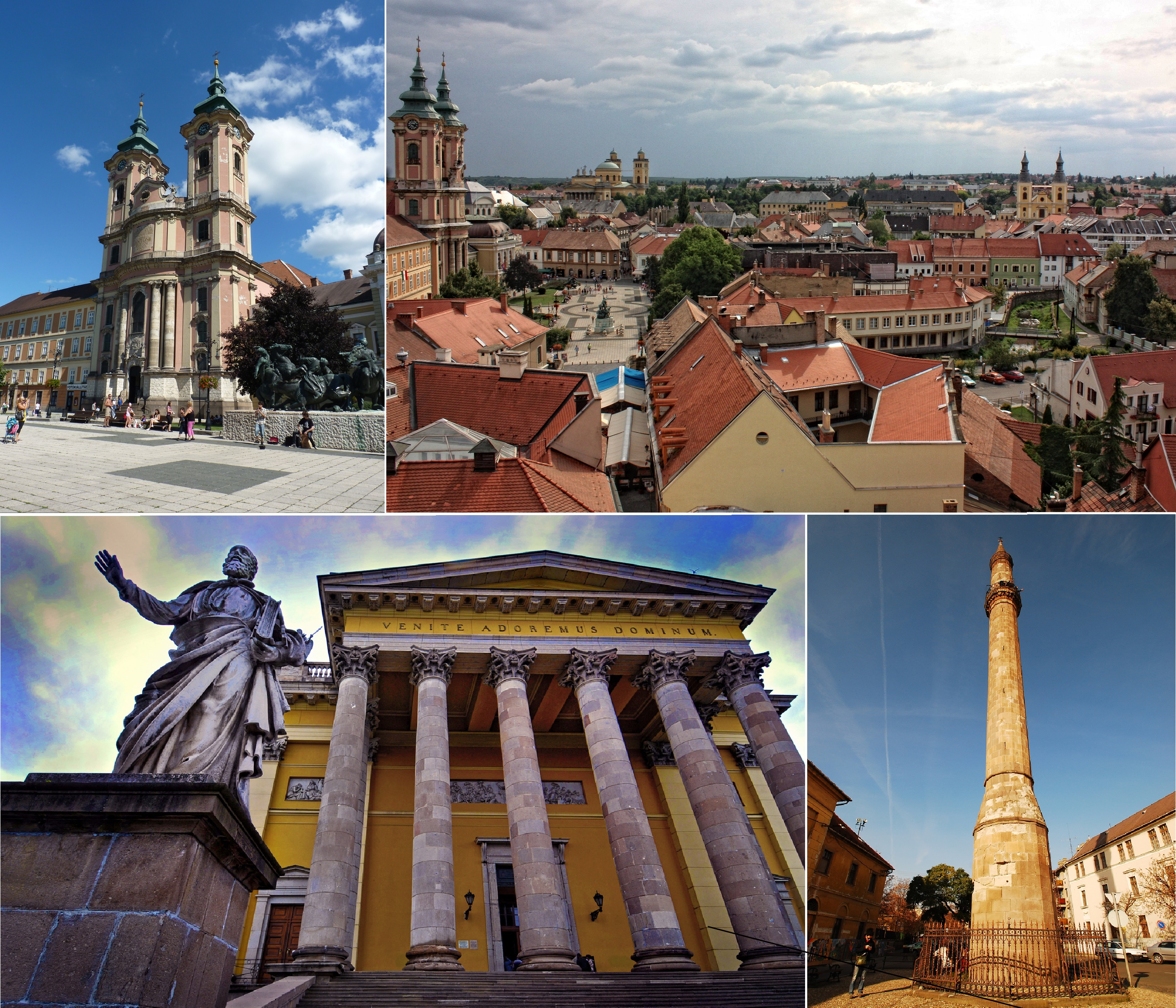
- Top left: Eger Minorite church. Top right: View of Eger from the castle. Bottom left: Egri Bazilika. Bottom right: Minaret Eger

- Flag Coat of arms Logo

- Location within Heves County Location within Hungary
- Coordinates: 47.89902°N 20.37470°E
- Country: Hungary
- County: Heves
- District: Eger

Government
  - Mayor: Ákos Vágner (FIDESZ)

Area
  - Total: 92.2 km^{2} (35.6 sq mi)
- Elevation: 165 m (541 ft)

Population (2017)
  - Total: 53,876
  - Rank: 19th in Hungary
  - Density: 584/km^{2} (1,510/sq mi)
- Time zone: UTC+1 (CET)
  - Summer (DST): UTC+2 (CEST)
- Postal code: 3300–3304
- Area code: (+36) 36
- Website: varos.eger.hu

Eger (UK: /ˈɛɡər/ EG-ər, US: /ˈeɪɡər/ AY-gər; Hungarian: [ˈɛɡɛr]; also known by other alternative names) is the county seat of Heves County, and the second largest city in Northern Hungary (after Miskolc). A city with county rights, Eger is best known for its medieval castle, thermal baths, baroque buildings, the northernmost Ottoman minaret, and red wines. Its population of around 53,000 (2017) makes it the 19th largest centre of population in Hungary, according to the census. The town is located on the Eger Stream (a tributary of the Tisza river), on the hills between the Mátra and Bükk Mountains. The main campus of Eszterházy Károly Catholic University is in Eger.

== Names and etymology ==
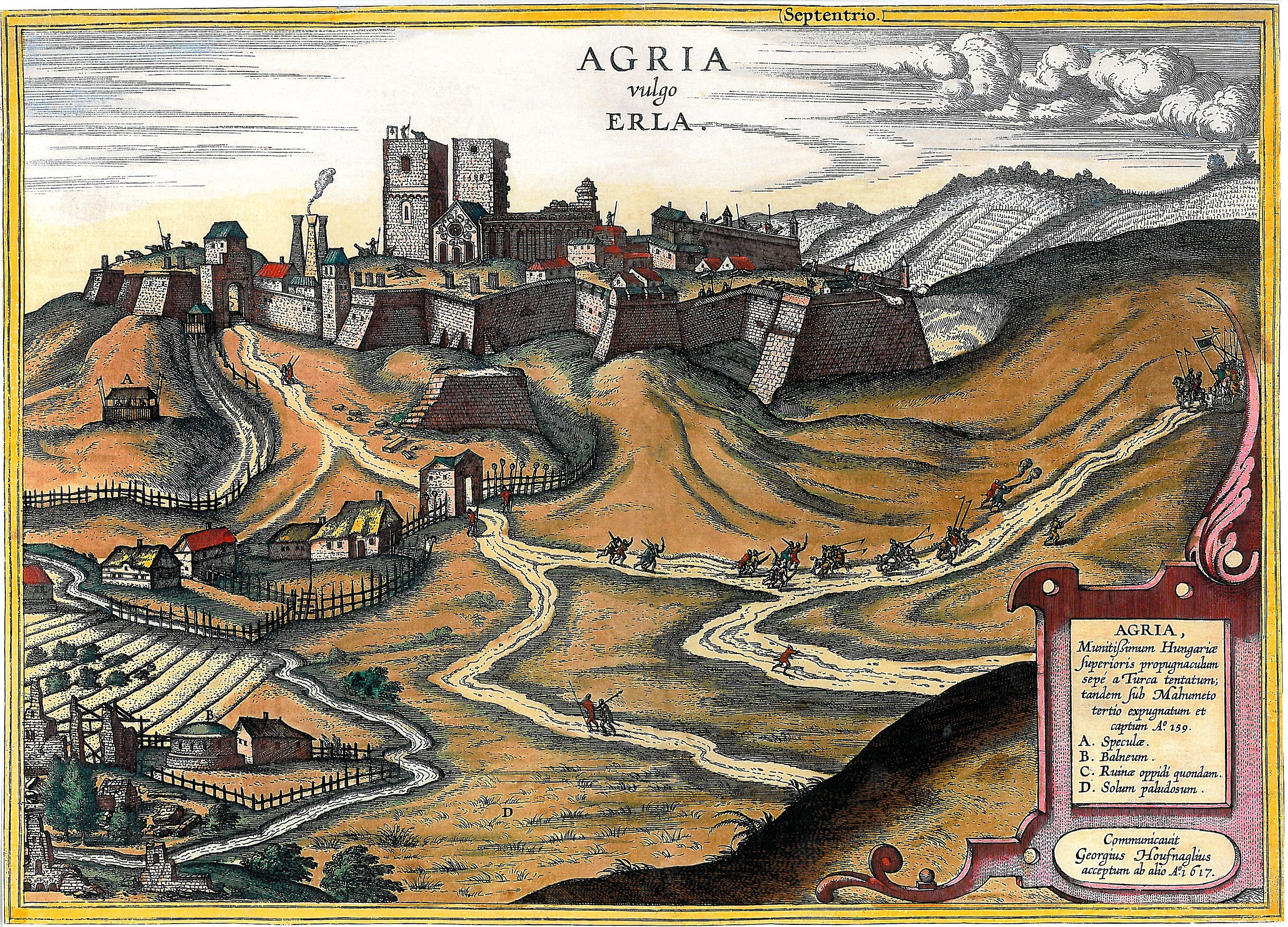
Eger in Georg Braun and Frans Hogenberg's Civitates orbis terrarum (1617)

The origin of its name is unknown. One suggestion is that the place was named after the alder (égerfa in Hungarian) which grew so abundantly along the banks of the Eger Stream. This explanation seems to be correct because the name of the town reflects its ancient natural environment, and also one of its most typical plants, the alder, large areas of which could be found everywhere on the marshy banks of the Stream although they have since disappeared. The German name of the town: Erlau, from Erlen-au ('alder grove'), also speaks in favour of this supposition. And there is another theory which says that Eger's name comes from the Latin word: ager ('field'). This theory comes from more recent researchers who think that during the 11th and 12th centuries settlers with a Walloon origin moved to this territory. The basin of Eger and the hilly region around it have always been very suitable for human settlements, and there are many archaeological findings from the early ages of history, which support this fact.

The other names of the town are in Latin Agria, in Serbian and Croatian Jegar / Јегар or Jegra / Јегра, in Czech and Slovene Jager, in Slovak Jáger, in Polish Eger, and in Turkish Eğri. Nickname: the Hungarian Athens

== Coat of arms ==
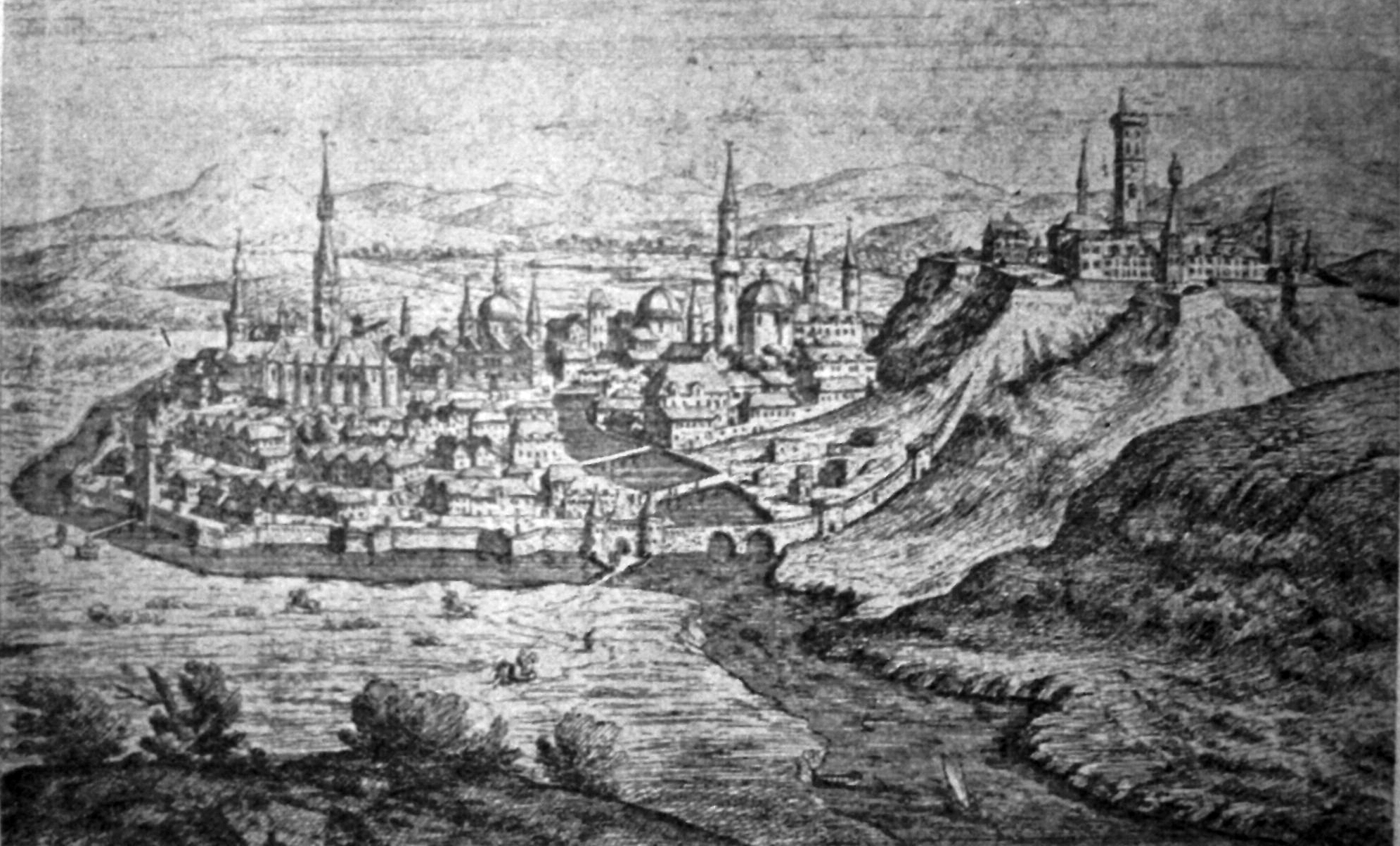
Eger in the 16th century

The shield of Eger developed from the shield of Bishop György Fenesy (1686–1689) after an agreement which was made with him in 1694. The bastion with the three gates on it refers to the existence of the fortress. The rampant unicorn between the two bastions on the side of the shield came from the bishop's shield. The sword in the fore-feet of the unicorn symbolises the manorial power of life and death. The snake twisting on the sword stands for the defeat of treachery and hatred by faith. The star and the sun symbolise the alternation of days and nights. And finally, the eagle with a gospel in its clutches refers to apostle and evangelist Saint John who is the patron saint of the Archdiocese of Eger.

== History ==
Eger has been inhabited since the Stone Age.

=== Reign of Saint Stephen ===
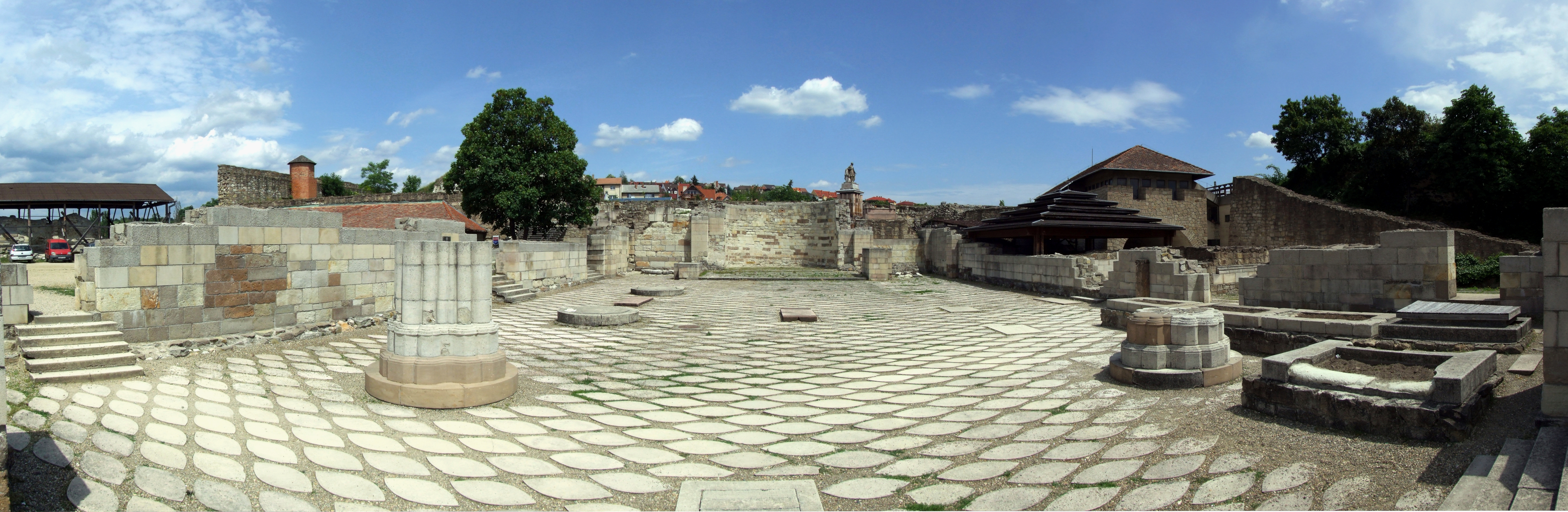
The ruins of the Romanesque basilica in the Eger Castle

Today's Eger may have been formed in the 10th century by St. Stephen (997–1038), the first Christian king of Hungary, who founded an episcopal see in Eger. The first cathedral of Eger was built on Castle Hill, within the present site of Eger Castle. Eger grew around this cathedral, and remains an important religious centre in Hungary.

This settlement took up an important place among the Hungarian towns even in the early Middle Ages. The natural fundamentals of the surroundings (meeting of plains and hills) made it possible to establish economic and cultural relations between the different parts of the country.

During the 11th and 12th centuries, Walloon settlers came from the areas beyond the Rhine. They settled with the kings' permission, bringing western culture to this region and acclimating the viticulture. The development of the town accelerated with their presence.

=== Mongol invasion ===
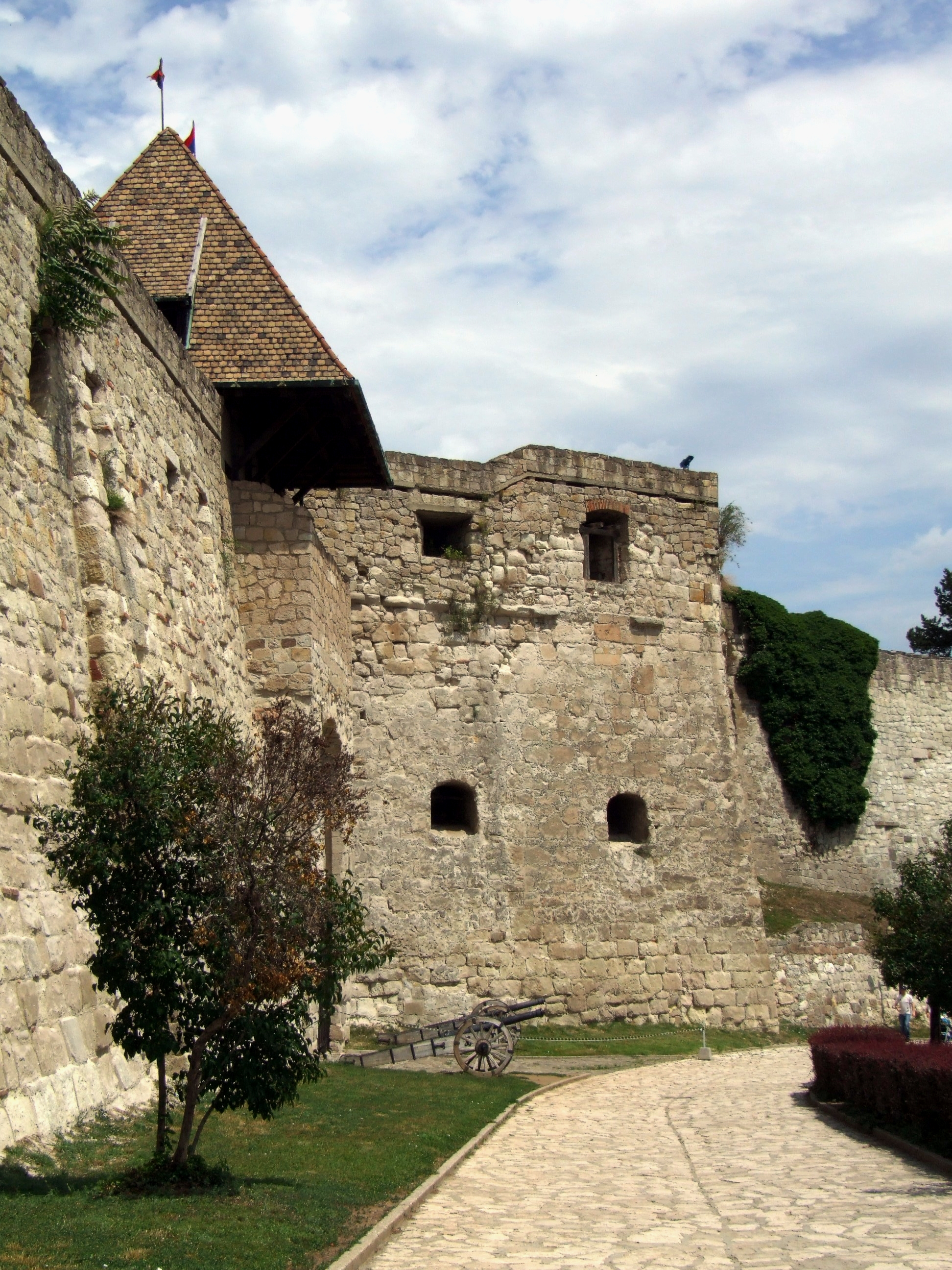
The stone fortress was built at that time

This development was blocked for a short time by the Mongol invasion in 1241, when the town was ransacked and burned down during the episcopacy of Cletus Bél.

After the withdrawal of the Mongols, Eger began to flourish all over again. Lampert, the bishop of Eger, received a permit from Béla IV for building a stone fortress. So the nearly destroyed town revived and reached the peak of its medieval development in the 14th and 15th centuries. During this period the forests which spread to the limits of the town were cleared for the most part, and vines were planted in their place. More and more town-houses were built in the settlement. Roads were constructed among which the ones in the inner town were narrow and twisting but those leading to the northern mining towns were wider. The various surrounding settlements such as Almagyar and Czigléd were built up along with Eger.

=== Reign of King Matthias ===
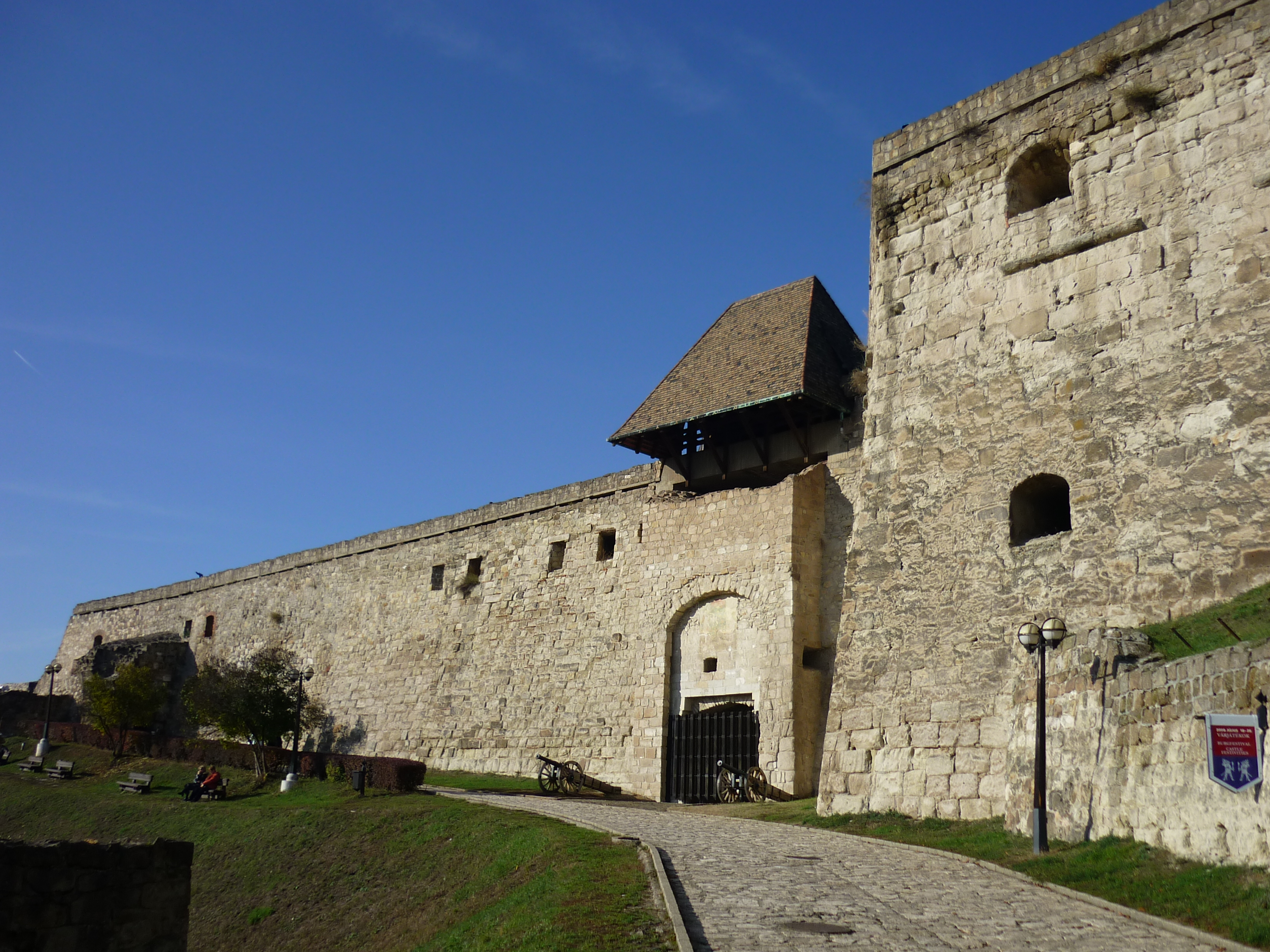
The Hippolyt Gate, one of the main entrances of the Eger Castle

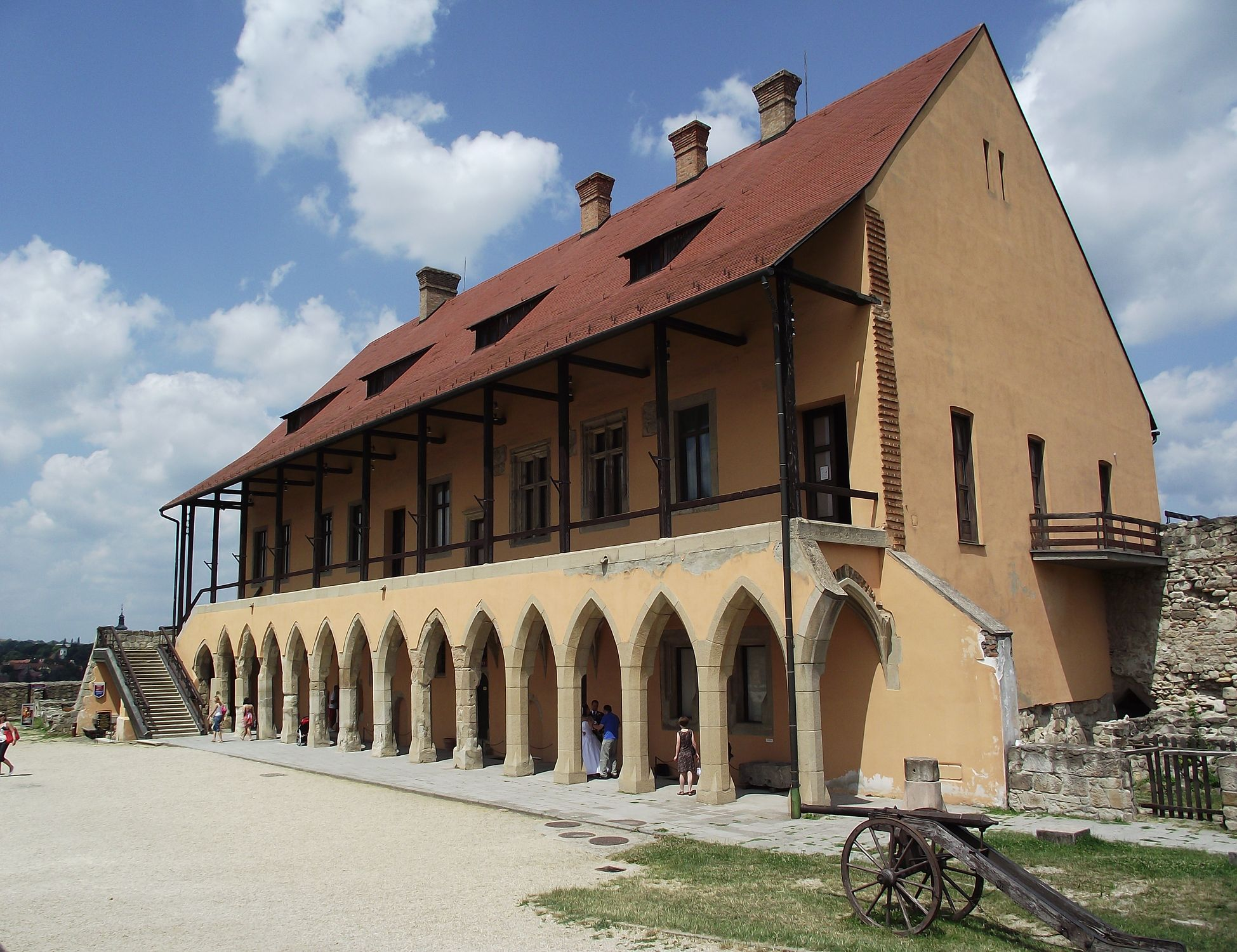
The gothic episcopal palace of the castle

During the reign of King Matthias (1458–1490), Eger began to develop again. The gothic-styled Bishops Palace of Eger which can be seen at the present time was reconstructed by the order of bishop János Bekensloer. Building operations continued during the bishoprics of Orbán Dóczy and Tamás Bakócz. The beginning of the reconstruction (in late gothic style) of the cathedral fort can also be linked to their names. After the death of King Matthias, during the bishopric of Hyppolit the so-called Hyppolit Gate was built, this has recently been removed.

=== The Siege of Eger ===
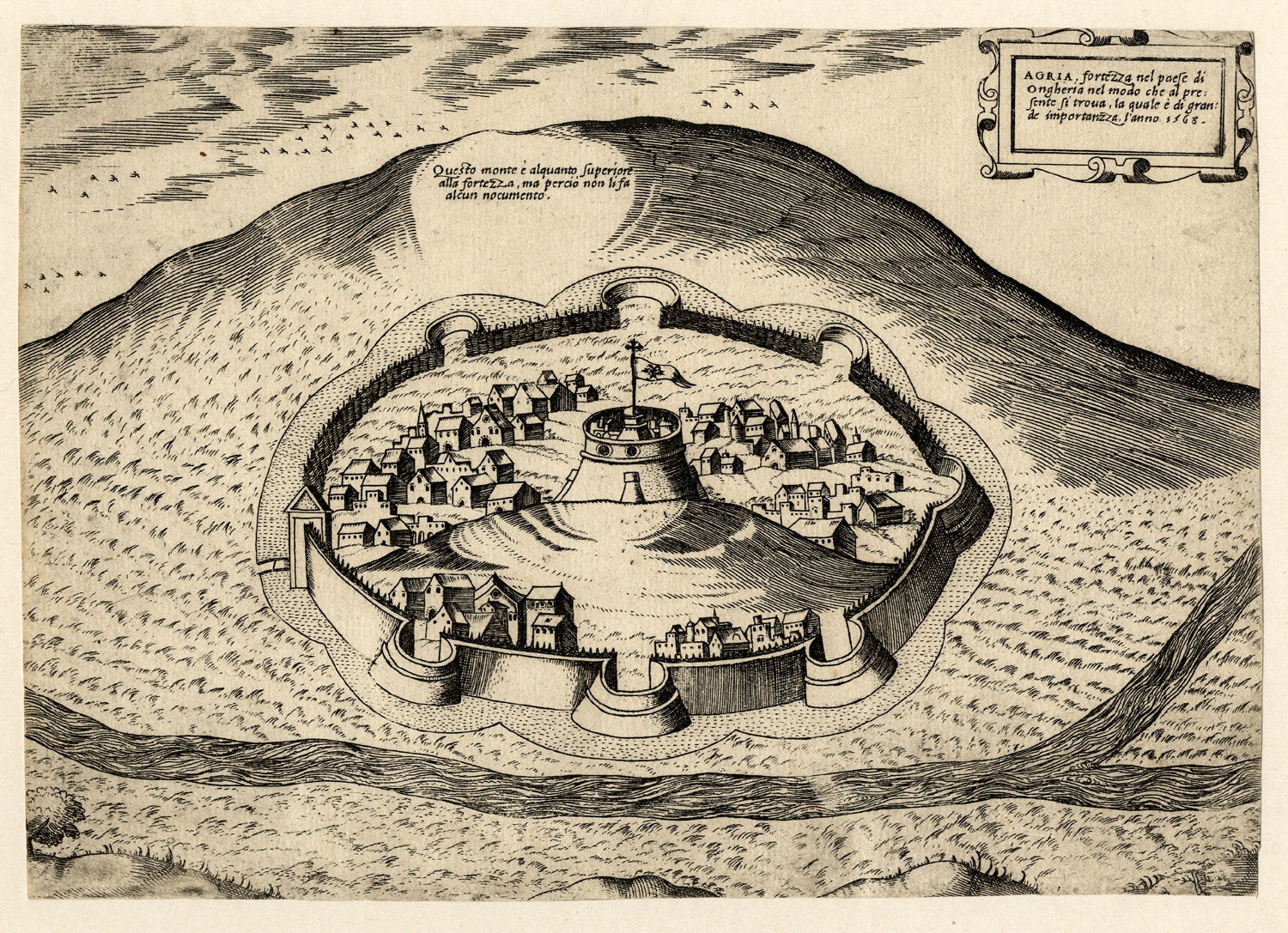
Eger in Wolf-Dietrich-Klebeband Städtebilder (1568)

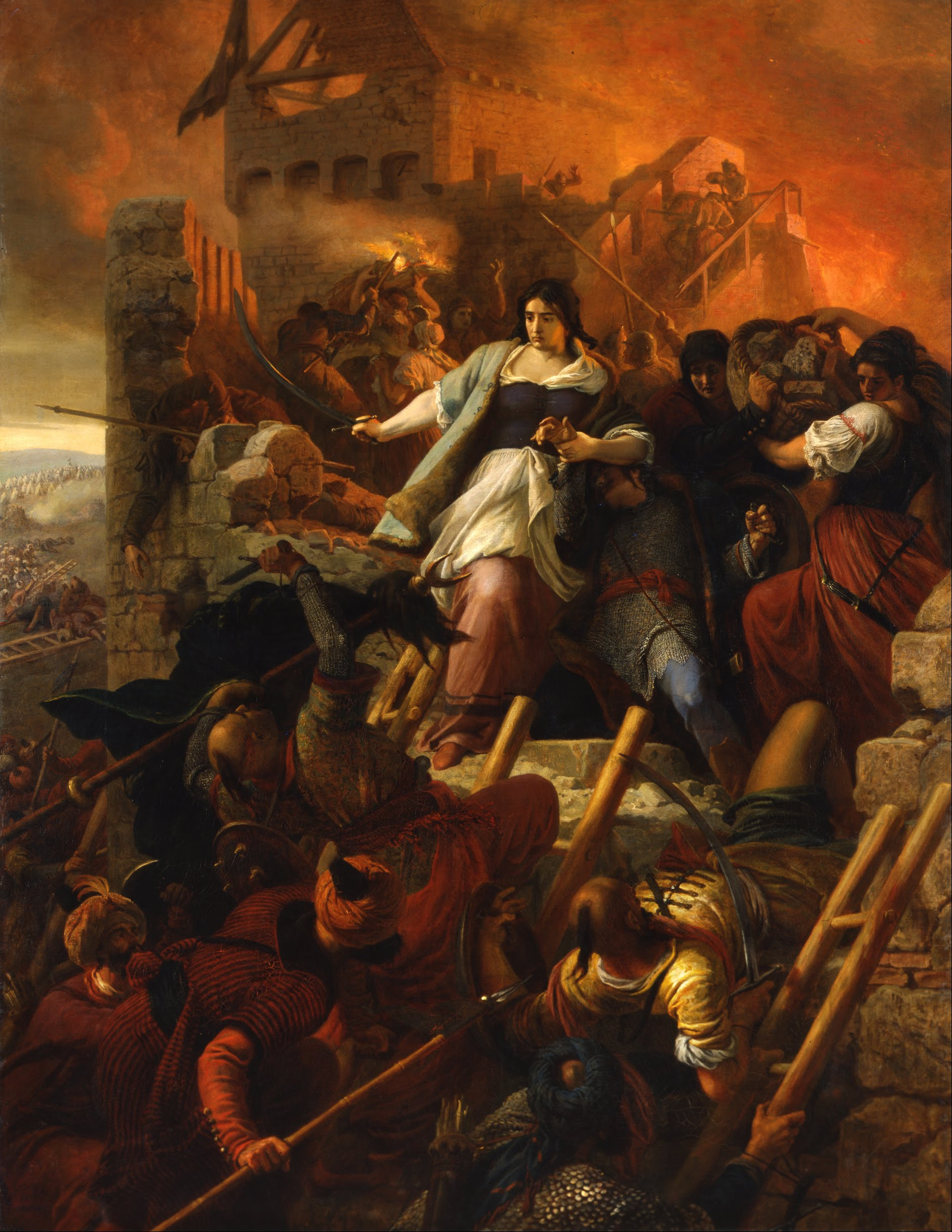
Bertalan Székely's "Women of Eger" depicts the siege of 1552

After the Battle of Mohács (1526) a sorrowful period began in the history of Eger. During the dual kingship the town changed hands almost every year and the Ottoman army came closer as well. This circumstance provided the reason for reinforcing the fortress. In the autumn of 1552, Captain István Dobó and a handful of soldiers were successful in defending the fortress and northern Hungary from the expanding Ottoman Empire. The first writer of note to draw on the story was the Hungarian Renaissance poet and musician Sebestyén Tinódi Lantos (c. 1510–1556), whose account may come partly from eyewitnesses. Géza Gárdonyi wrote his novel, "Eclipse of the Crescent Moon" in remembrance of this battle, and his work has been translated into numerous languages.

Despite the fact that István Dobó and his soldiers successfully defended the fortress, it was destroyed during the siege, so it was essential to wholly rebuild it. The reconstruction process of the fortress took place between 1553 and 1596 and Italian artificer officers planned the renovations. Famous Hungarian poet Bálint Balassi served here for a few years, beginning in April 1578.

=== Ottoman rule ===
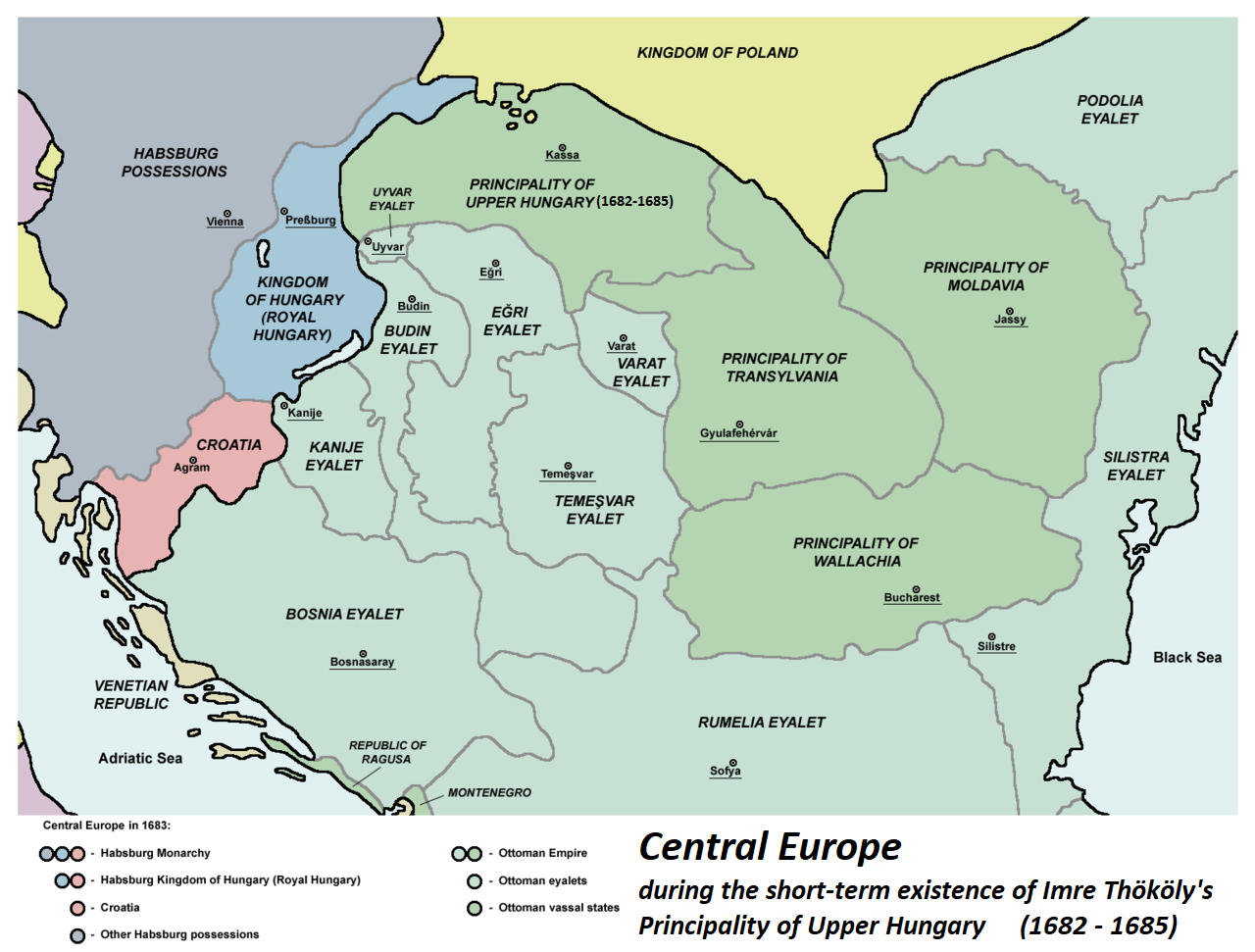
The Eğri Eyalet in the Ottoman Empire (1683)

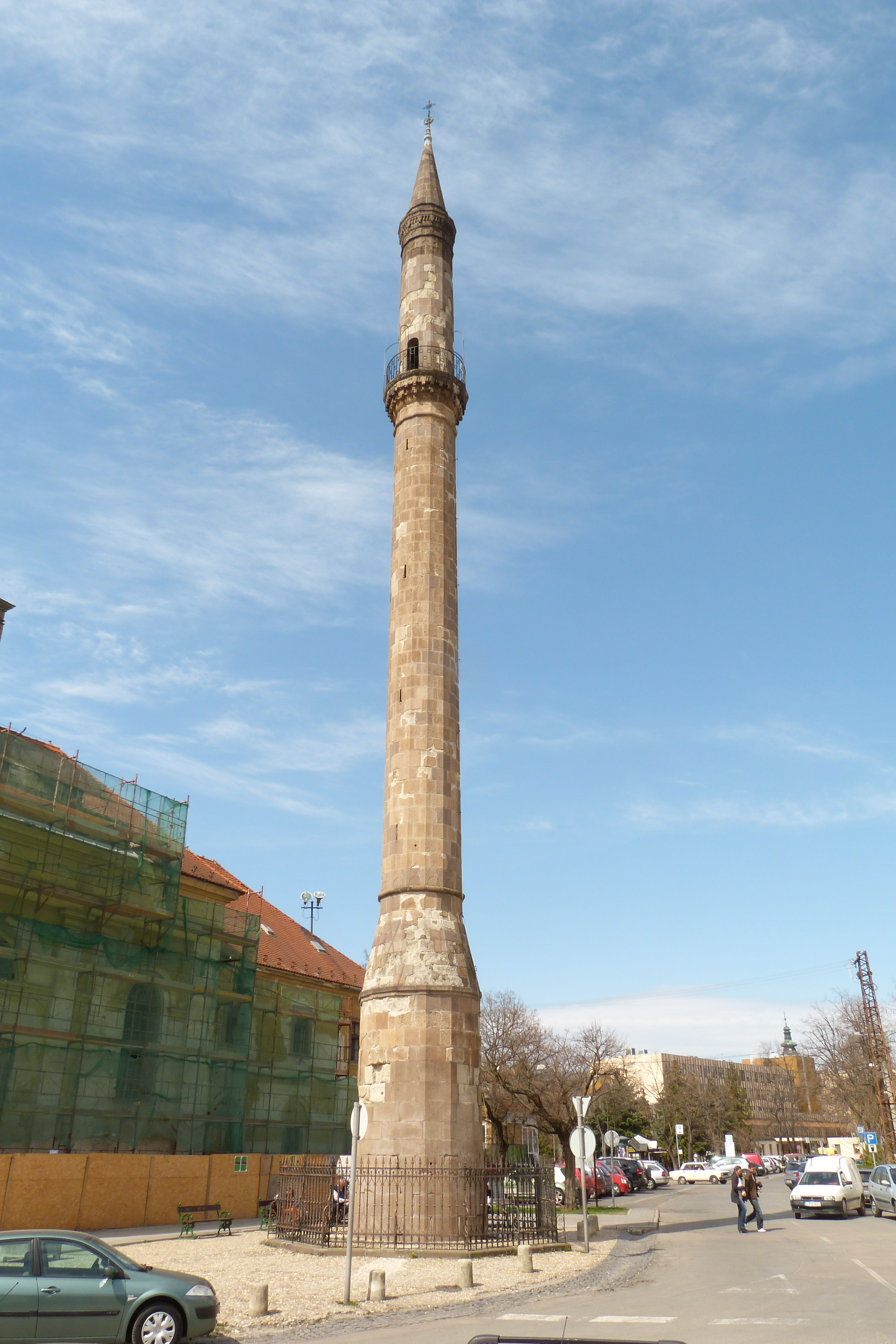
Eger minaret, the northernmost surviving Ottoman minaret in Europe

While István Dobó and his soldiers managed to defend the fortress in 1552, in 1596, the captain at that time and the foreign mercenaries under his rule handed it over, initializing the 91-year-long Ottoman rule in Eger. The Eger minaret, which was built at the end of the 17th century, preserves the memory of this period. Among all the buildings of this type, the minaret of Eger is the northernmost point of the former Ottoman Empire. During the Ottoman occupation Eger became the seat of a vilayet (which is an Ottoman domain including several sanjaks.) Churches were converted into mosques, the castle rebuilt, and other structures erected, including public baths and minarets.

The rule of the Turks in Central Hungary began to collapse after a failed Ottoman attempt to capture Vienna. The Vienna-based Habsburgs, who controlled the rest of Hungary (apart from Transylvania) steadily expelled the Turks from the country. The castle of Eger was starved into surrender by the Holy League army led by Charles V, Duke of Lorraine in 1687, after the castle of Buda had been retaken in 1686. Eger was relieved from Ottoman rule in December 1687. Although the reoccupation was affected by a siege (which starved out the defenders) and not by a bombardment, the town fell into a very poor state. According to the records, there were only 413 houses in the area within the town walls which were habitable, and most of these were occupied by Turkish families.

=== Habsburg rule ===
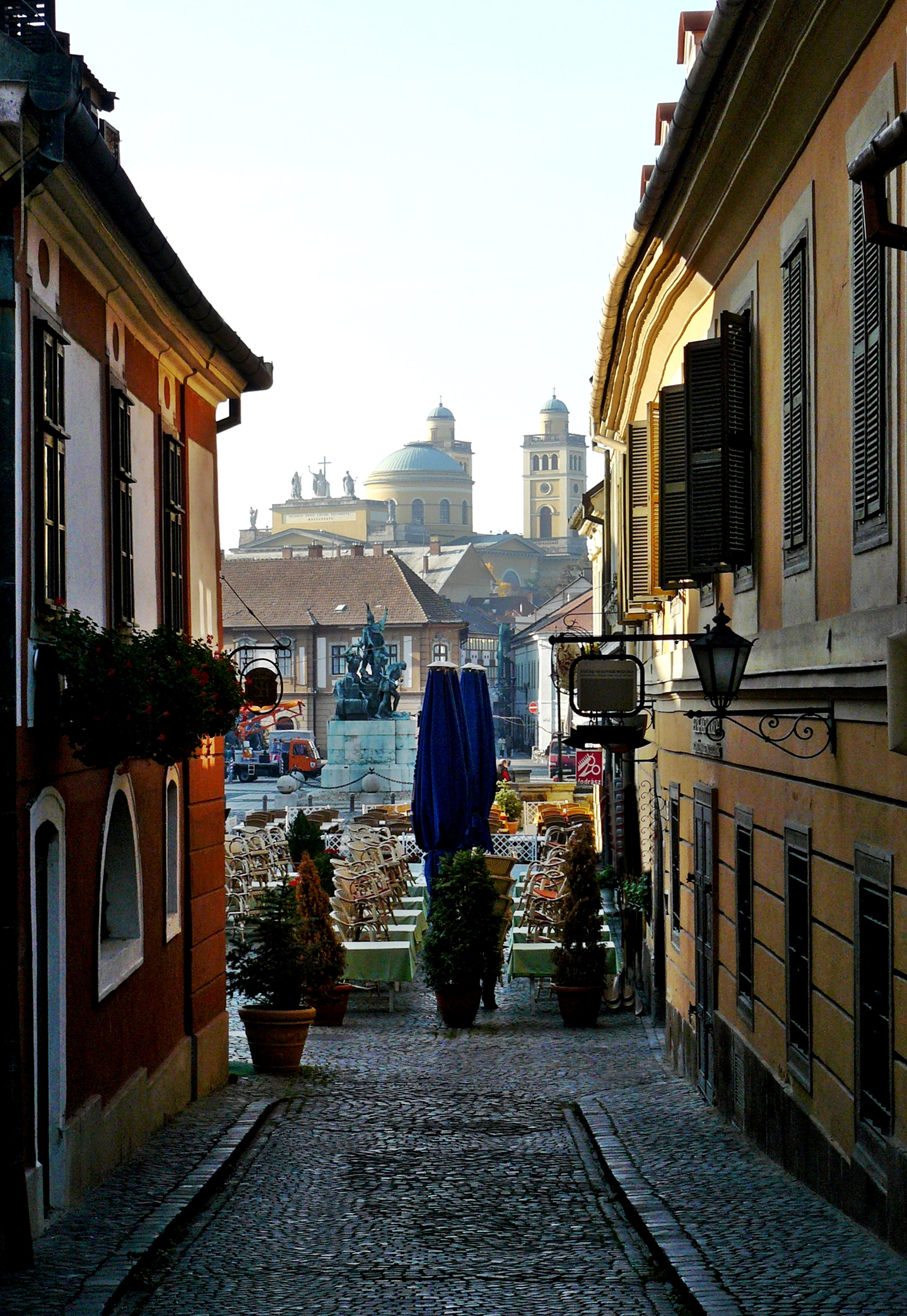
Eger is famous for the narrow alleys in the old part of the inner town.

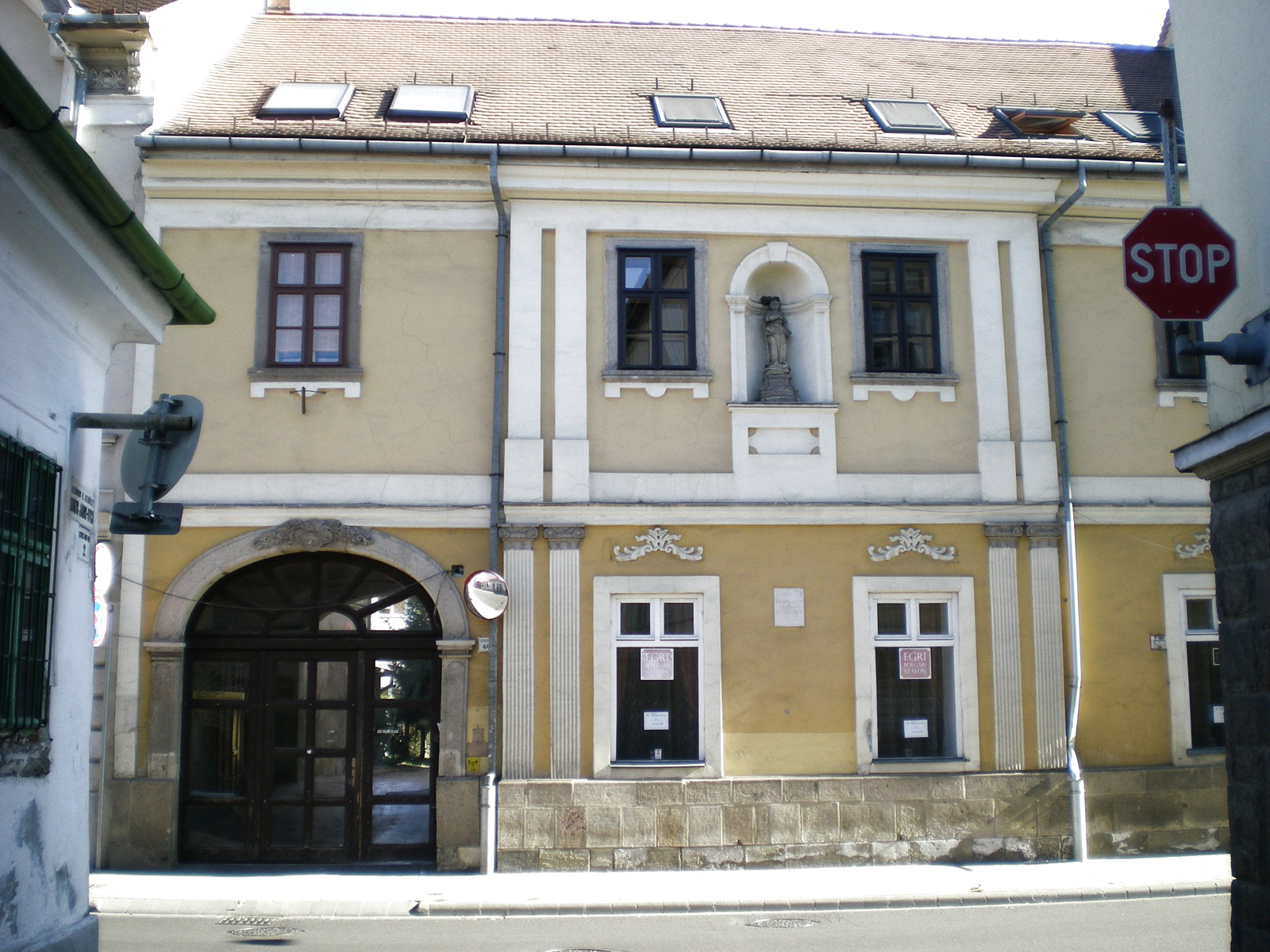
A house in the town centre

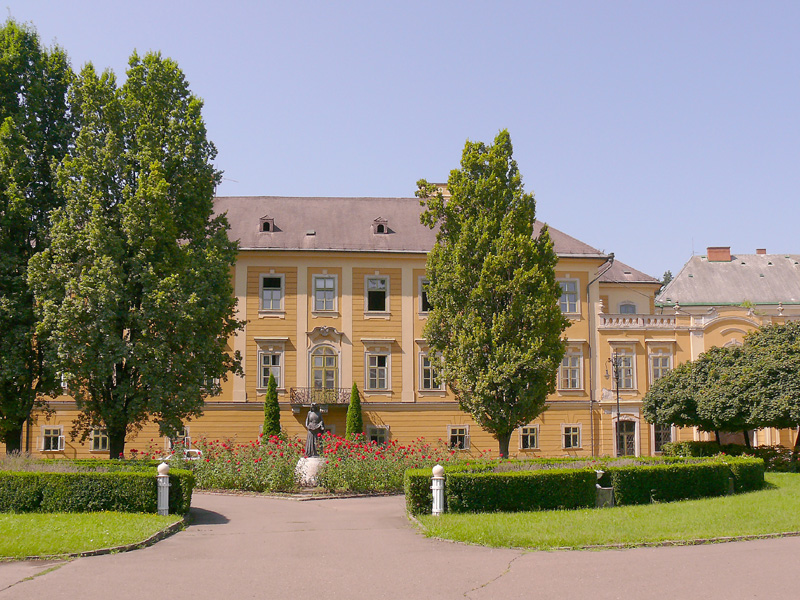
The Archiepiscopal Palace of Eger

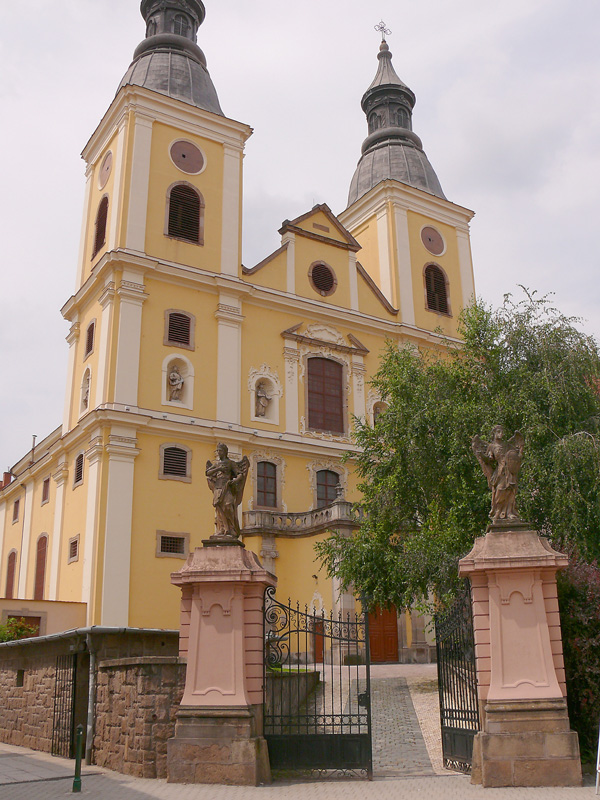
The Cistercian Church of Eger

After the expelling of the Turks, the town was considered by the imperial regiment as a demesne of the Crown. Leopold I re-established Eger as a free royal borough in 1688, which meant that it was relieved from the ecclesiastic manorial burdens. This state lasted until 1695, when Fenessy György, the returning bishop, had the former legal status of a bishopric town restored by the monarch.

Eger soon began to prosper again. The town was reclaimed by its bishops, which caused many local Protestants to leave. Although the town supported the Hungarian leader Prince Francis II Rákóczi in the 1703–1711 war of independence against the Habsburgs, the Hungarians were eventually defeated by the Imperial army. In 1709, Francis II Rákóczi and Ukranciev, the legate of Peter the Great, met here. It must be added that the legate died in Eger and was buried near the Serbian Church of Eger. Soon after that, the town was ravaged by plague. However, immigration into Eger was strong, and the population rose from 6000 to 10,000 between 1725 and 1750. Muslims were assimilated into the Christian population.

In the history of Eger, the 18th century was the period of development and prosperity. Many new buildings were built in Baroque and later in Rococo and Neoclassical style, including the cathedral, the Archiepiscopal Palace of Eger, the County Hall of Eger, the Eger Lyceum (now housing the Eszterházy College of Education) and several churches, while others were reclaimed from being mosques.

The building processes attracted many craftsman, merchants, and artists, including Kracker János Lukács, Anton Maulberts, Franz Sigrist, Josef Ignaz Gerl, Jakab Fellner, and Henrik Fasola. The town population grew suddenly. While in 1688 it was only 1200, in 1787 more than 17,000 people lived here. At this time, Eger was the 6th largest town of Hungary (based on the number of its inhabitants). Viticulture also reached its brightest period in these days. The wine-growing area was twelve times larger than it had been earlier.

The 18th century was also important because bishop Barkóczy and Eszterházy decided to found a university in Eger patterned after the ones in Nagyszombat and in Vienna. There were already precedents for this type of education because in 1700 Bishop István Telekessy, who took sides with Ferenc Rákóczy the Second, established a seminary in Eger. Then in 1740, Canon György Foglár founded a Faculty of Law and in 1754 bishop Barkóczy set up a school of philosophy. In the building which was marked out for the university is the Archdiocese's Library, and an astronomical museum with original equipment, which was the second museum of this type in Europe. Between 1946 and 1948 there were several more efforts to found a university in Eger all of which also ended in failure.

The 19th century began with disasters: a fire that destroyed half the town in 1800, and a collapse of the south wall of the Castle in 1801, which ruined several houses. Eger became the seat of an archbishopric in 1804, and the church remained in firm control of the town, despite efforts by its citizens to obtain greater freedom. In 1827, much of the town centre was damaged by fire again, and four years later over 200 were killed in an outbreak of cholera.

In 1804, a significant change occurred in the organisation of Eger's bishopric. The monarch made this town a centre of archbisphoric, but the bishoprics of Szatmár and Kassa separated from it.

=== The Period of Reforms ===
The Period of Reforms (1825–1848) left several lasting marks on the life of Eger, especially on its culture. Pyrker László János, the archbishop of that time, founded a gallery which he donated to the Hungarian National Museum because the town did not guarantee an appropriate place for it. It was Pyrker's present which served as a base for the collection of the Museum of Fine Arts that was opened in 1900. In 1828 Pyrker established the first Hungarian teachers training college in Eger and he was the one who ordered the construction of the basilica which was built in neo-classical style, in accordance with the plans of József Hild. On the basis of its size, this basilica is the second among the churches of Hungary. In 1837, János Joó, an art teacher, began to edit Hungary's first technical journal with the title "Héti Lapok".

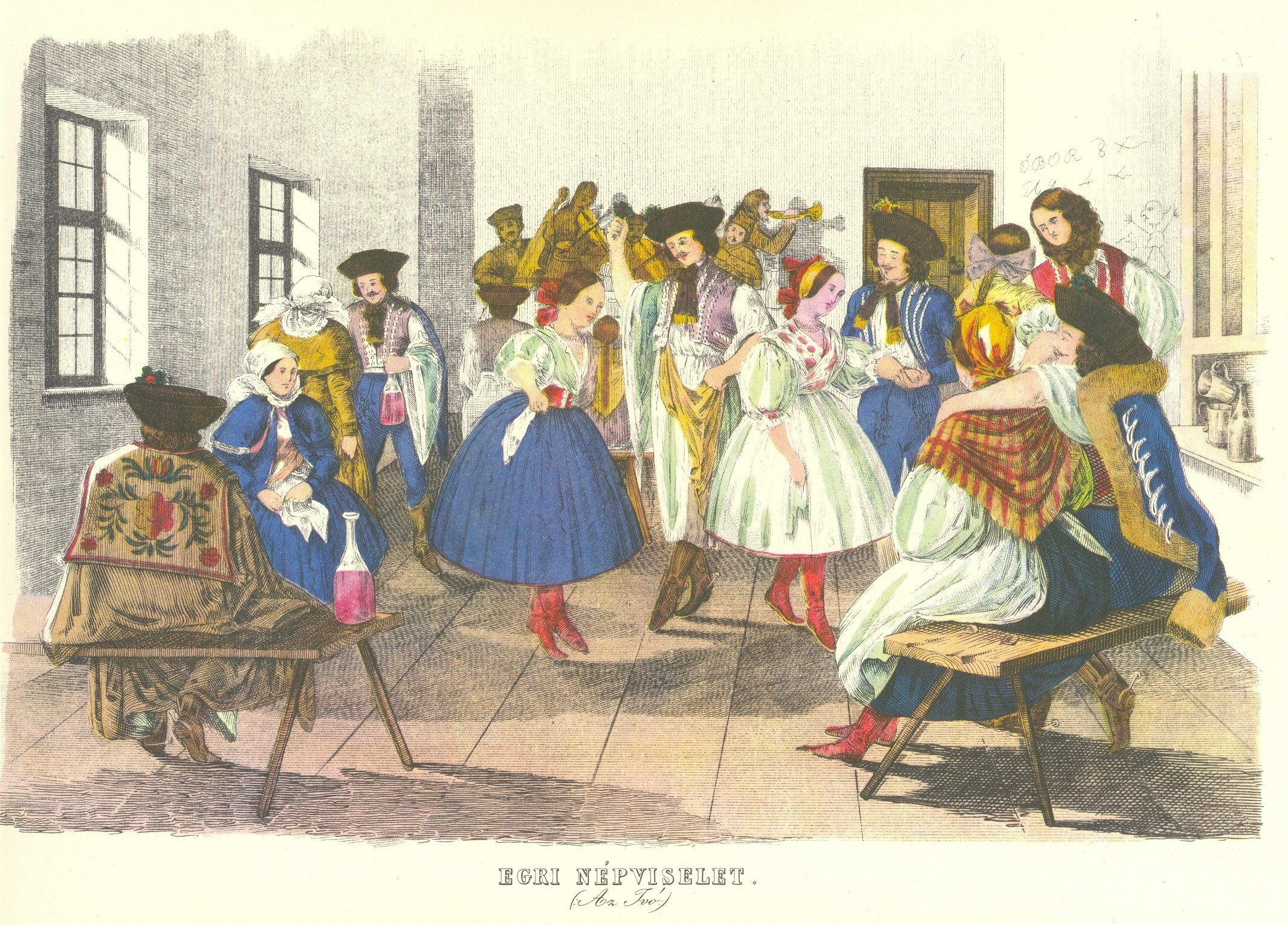
Traditional clothing of the citizens of Eger, 1846

=== Revolution and War of Independence ===
The inhabitants of Eger took an active part in the revolution in 1848. Even though the revolution was suppressed, the age of landowners and serfs had gone forever, and the municipality gained freedom from the rule of the archbishop in 1854.

=== Age of the monarchy ===
The main railway line between Miskolc and Pest bypassed the town, which was only reached later by a branch line from Füzesabony. Unfortunately (unlike other towns) Eger's civil development did not become faster, as distinguished from other towns, after 1849 and the Compromise of 1867. Industrial development was represented only by the mill, the tobacco factory and the sheet-iron works that were founded in the Reform Age.

During the decades after the turn of the century, the character of a school-town was dominant in Eger. Because of its schools and other cultural institutions, it became known as the Hungarian Athens.

At the beginning of the century, in 1904, the first independent theatre of stone was opened and the canalisation and the provision of public utilities began as well.

=== 20th century ===
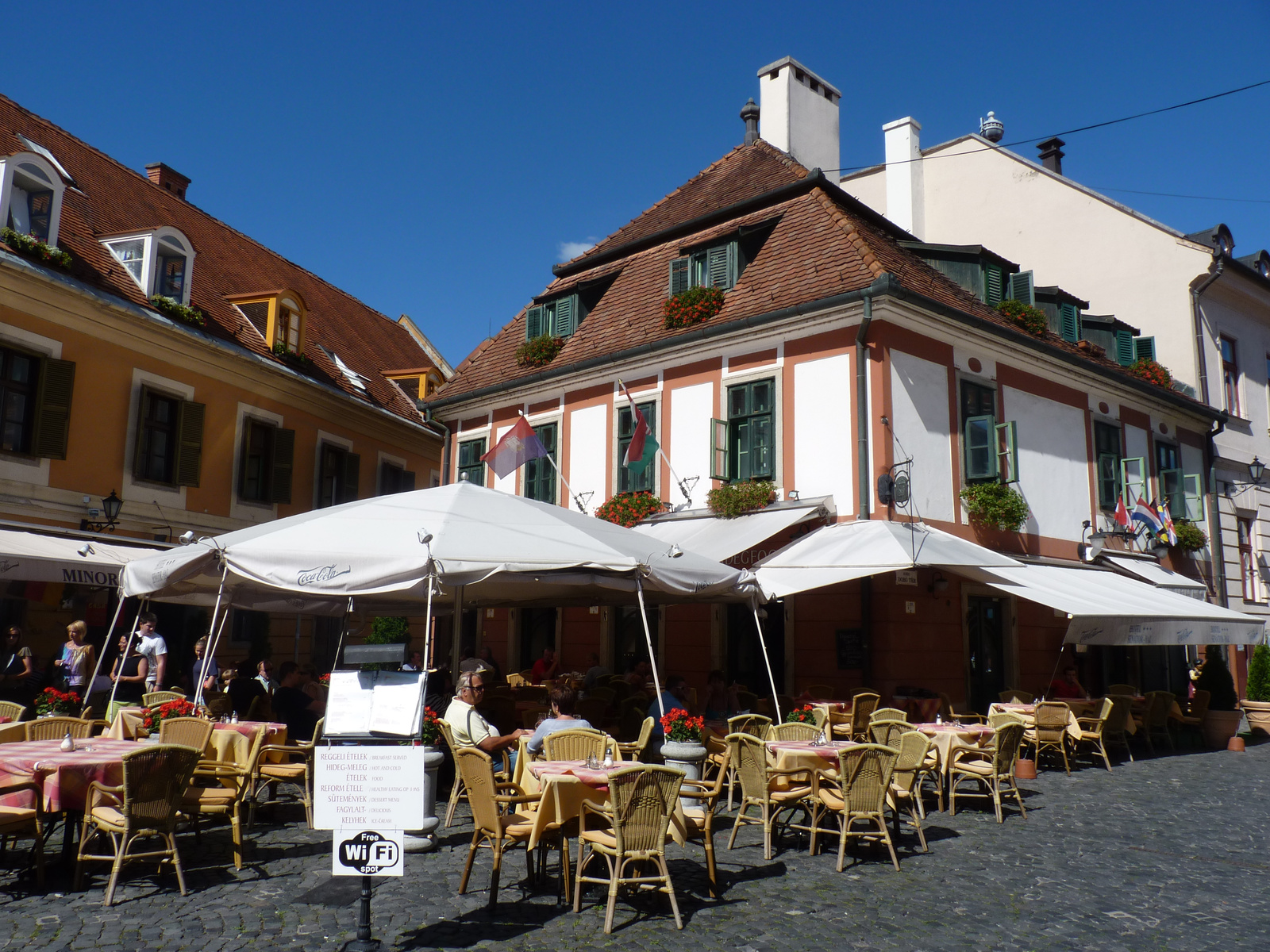
A restaurant in Eger

Economic recovery was slow after World War I, although the 1899 publication of Gárdonyi's "Eclipse of the Crescent Moon" made Eger popular as a tourist attraction and archaeological excavation of the castle resumed.

In 1933, Eger was one of those towns that first got the permission for opening a spa.

In 1910, 2,674 Jews lived in the village but in 1944 the Jewish community was murdered by Hungarians and Germans during the Holocaust.

In World War II, the city suffered under the retreating German Army and the arriving Soviet army, but it managed to escape major bombardment.

In the decades after 1945, industrialization of the town commenced because of the change of regime. As a consequence, Eger's former character of a cultural centre began to fade, which diminished the patina of the settlement.

It was of great fortune that in 1968 the baroque inner city was preserved. It was saved from the deterioration (and from the construction of unsuitable, modern buildings).

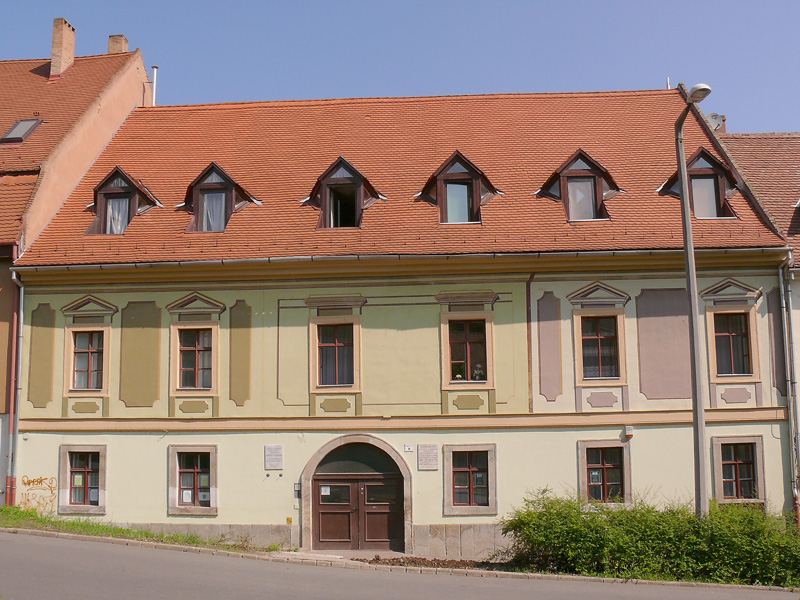
The birthplace of Sándor Bródy in Eger

Eger is known for its wines, especially the "Egri Bikavér" (Bull's Blood of Eger). It is also known for "Egri Víz", a type of brandy that originated in the 18th century, the "bujavászon" (a special Turkish tissue), and its thermal baths. Today, Eger is a tourist destination with a Baroque town centre.

== Ecclesiastical history ==
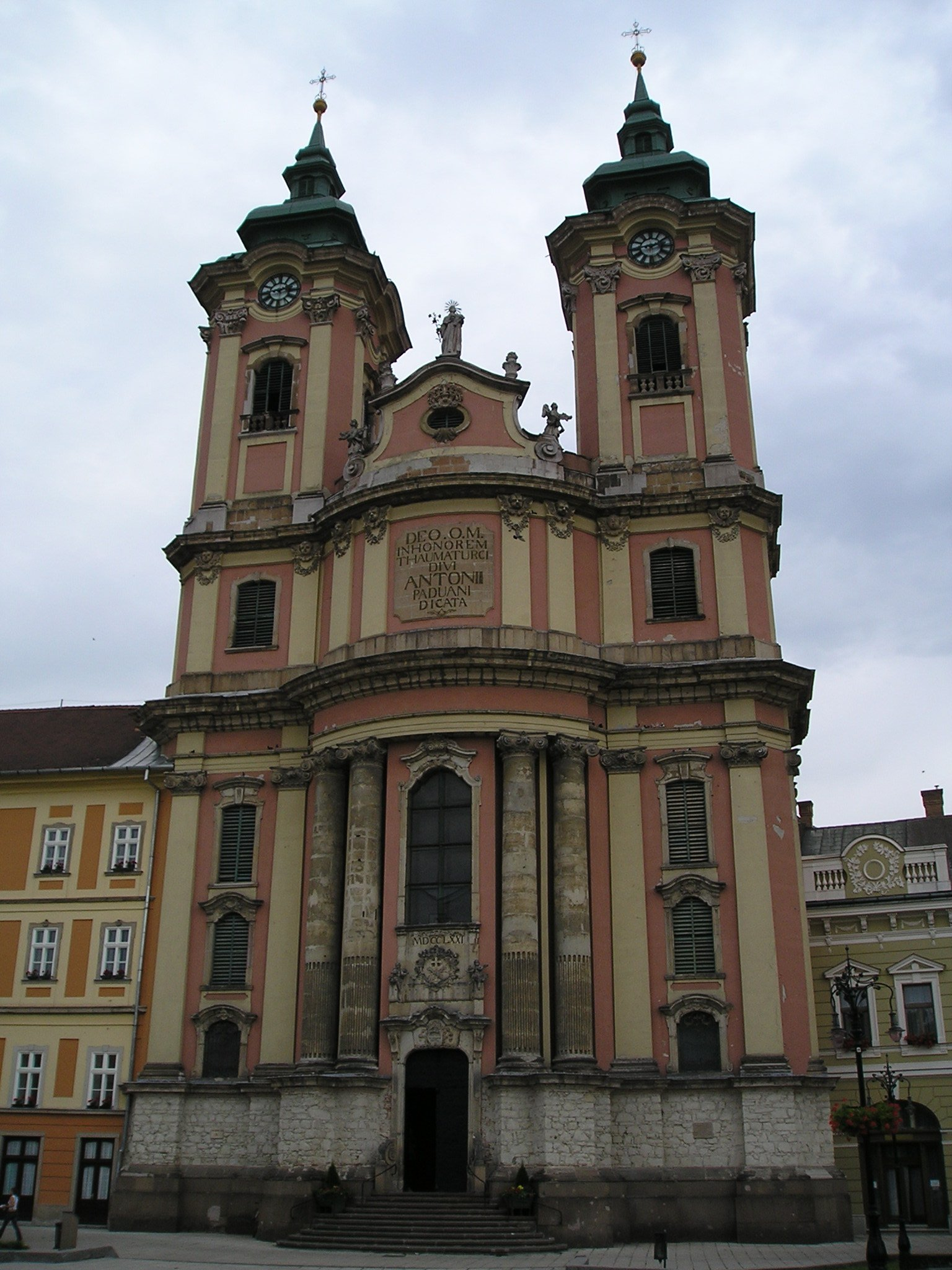
The minorite church of Eger

Eger is the seat of the Roman Catholic Archdiocese of Eger, an ecclesiastical province of Hungary founded as a bishopric in 1009 and made a Metropolitan archdiocese in 1804, by Pope Pius VII. The current archbishop-elect, Archbishop Csaba Ternyak, was previously Secretary for the Congregation For Clergy. He succeeds Archbishop István Seregely, who retired because of age. The constituent dioceses of the province were Košice (Kassa, Kaschau), Rožňava (Rozsnyó, Rosenau, now part of Slovakia), Szatmár, and Szepes (Zipo, Zipsen).

== Geography ==
=== Climate ===
Eger has a humid continental climate (Köppen: Dfb) closely bordering on an oceanic climate (Cfb) or humid subtropical climate (Cfa). The annual average temperature of Eger is 10.8 °C (51.4 °F), and the warmest July has an average temperature of 21.6 °C (70.9 °F), while January is the only month below freezing, with an average temperature of −0.8 °C (30.6 °F). The annual precipitation is 583.4 millimetres (22.97 in), of which January is the month with the least precipitation at 25.7 millimetres (1.01 in), while July is the month with the most precipitation at 82.9 millimetres (3.26 in). Temperature extremes ranged from −18.3 °C (−0.9 °F) on January 13, 2003, to 38.6 °C (101.5 °F) on July 20, 2007.

Climate data for Eger, 1991–2020 normals
Month	Jan	Feb	Mar	Apr	May	Jun	Jul	Aug	Sep	Oct	Nov	Dec	Year
Record high °C (°F)	15.3 (59.5)	18.2 (64.8)	23.2 (73.8)	29.7 (85.5)	32.1 (89.8)	36.5 (97.7)	38.6 (101.5)	37.4 (99.3)	34.0 (93.2)	27.0 (80.6)	22.3 (72.1)	13.8 (56.8)	38.6 (101.5)
Mean daily maximum °C (°F)	2.4 (36.3)	5.3 (41.5)	10.8 (51.4)	17.2 (63.0)	21.9 (71.4)	25.4 (77.7)	27.6 (81.7)	27.7 (81.9)	22.1 (71.8)	15.9 (60.6)	9.0 (48.2)	2.8 (37.0)	15.7 (60.3)
Daily mean °C (°F)	−0.8 (30.6)	1.2 (34.2)	5.9 (42.6)	11.7 (53.1)	16.0 (60.8)	19.7 (67.5)	21.6 (70.9)	21.5 (70.7)	16.4 (61.5)	10.9 (51.6)	5.5 (41.9)	0.0 (32.0)	10.8 (51.4)
Mean daily minimum °C (°F)	−3.5 (25.7)	−2.2 (28.0)	1.5 (34.7)	6.5 (43.7)	10.8 (51.4)	14.1 (57.4)	15.8 (60.4)	15.7 (60.3)	11.6 (52.9)	6.7 (44.1)	2.5 (36.5)	−2.5 (27.5)	6.4 (43.5)
Record low °C (°F)	−18.3 (−0.9)	−17.9 (−0.2)	−12.1 (10.2)	−4.2 (24.4)	−0.8 (30.6)	4.7 (40.5)	5.9 (42.6)	5.7 (42.3)	2.2 (36.0)	−7.7 (18.1)	−11.9 (10.6)	−17.2 (1.0)	−18.3 (−0.9)
Average precipitation mm (inches)	25.7 (1.01)	30.5 (1.20)	27.9 (1.10)	42.5 (1.67)	63.5 (2.50)	70.9 (2.79)	82.9 (3.26)	64.4 (2.54)	48.7 (1.92)	46.4 (1.83)	43.5 (1.71)	36.5 (1.44)	583.4 (22.97)
Average precipitation days (≥ 1.0 mm)	5.7	5.9	5.9	6.8	9.0	8.3	8.5	6.7	6.0	6.1	6.8	7.0	82.7
Average relative humidity (%)	82.1	75.2	63.4	58.4	63.8	64.4	63.5	62.3	67.6	74.0	80.0	83.4	69.8
Mean monthly sunshine hours	71.9	93.9	162.6	208.0	255.3	256.4	282.2	268.8	184.2	147.6	83.3	57.0	2,071.2
Source 1: OMSZ (sun 1991–2020)
Source 2: NOAA

== Wine ==
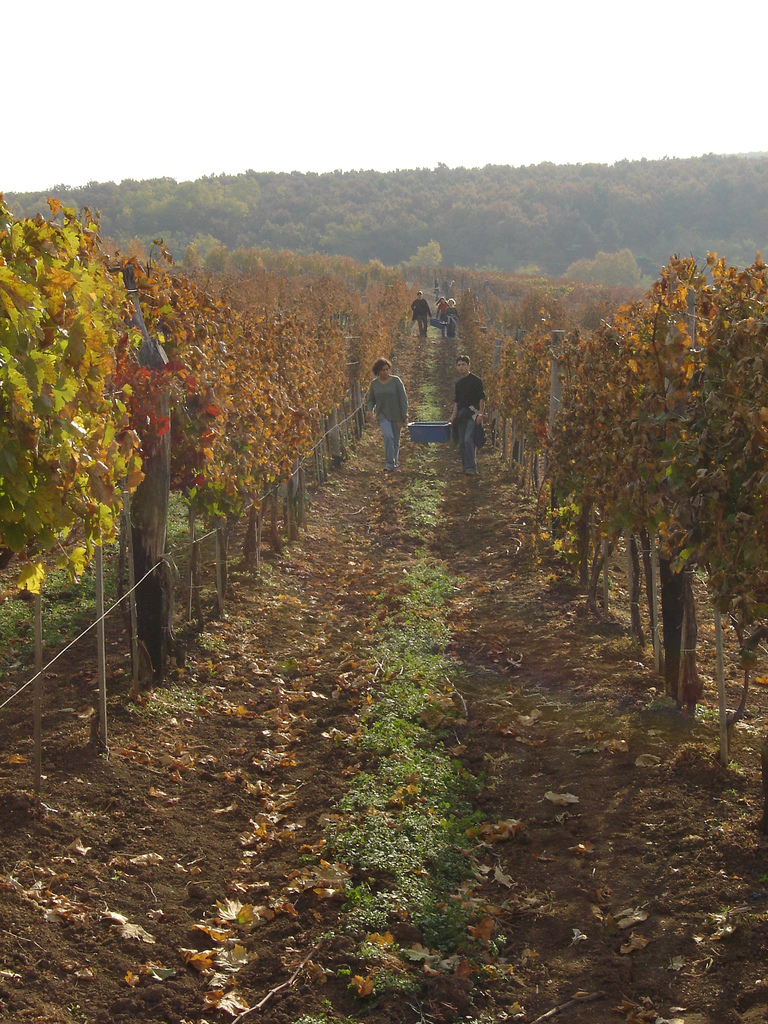
A vineyard in Eger

Beside its historic sights and its thermal baths, Eger is famous for its wines. It produces both red and white wines of high quality. The famous and traditional varieties of the region are Egri Leányka, Egerszóláti Olaszrizling, Debrői Hárslevelű (whites), and Egri Bikavér (a red). More recently, Chardonnay and Pinot noir wines have appeared. The region's wines are said to bear a resemblance to those of Burgundy. Although the quality of the wines deteriorated in the second half of the 20th century, especially the cuvees, Eger is slowly recovering its reputation as a wine region. The most important terroir of the Eger wine region is the Nagy-Eged Hill, which is a Grand Cru terroir, where premium Grand Superior wines are produced.

== Tourism ==
The majority of visitors come for a single day (mostly from Slovakia), not staying overnight. Ukrainians and Russians frequent the Eger Castle, along with many Italians. Around the town, one may encounter many German-speaking travelers (Germans, Austrians, and Swiss) as well. However, the town is getting more popular for Turkish tourists, because of the common historical memories. Eger is mainly known for its castle, thermal baths (including an Olympic size swimming pool), historic buildings (including Eger minaret – the northernmost Turkish minaret) and, above all else, its famous Hungarian red wines.

== Transport ==
=== Rail ===
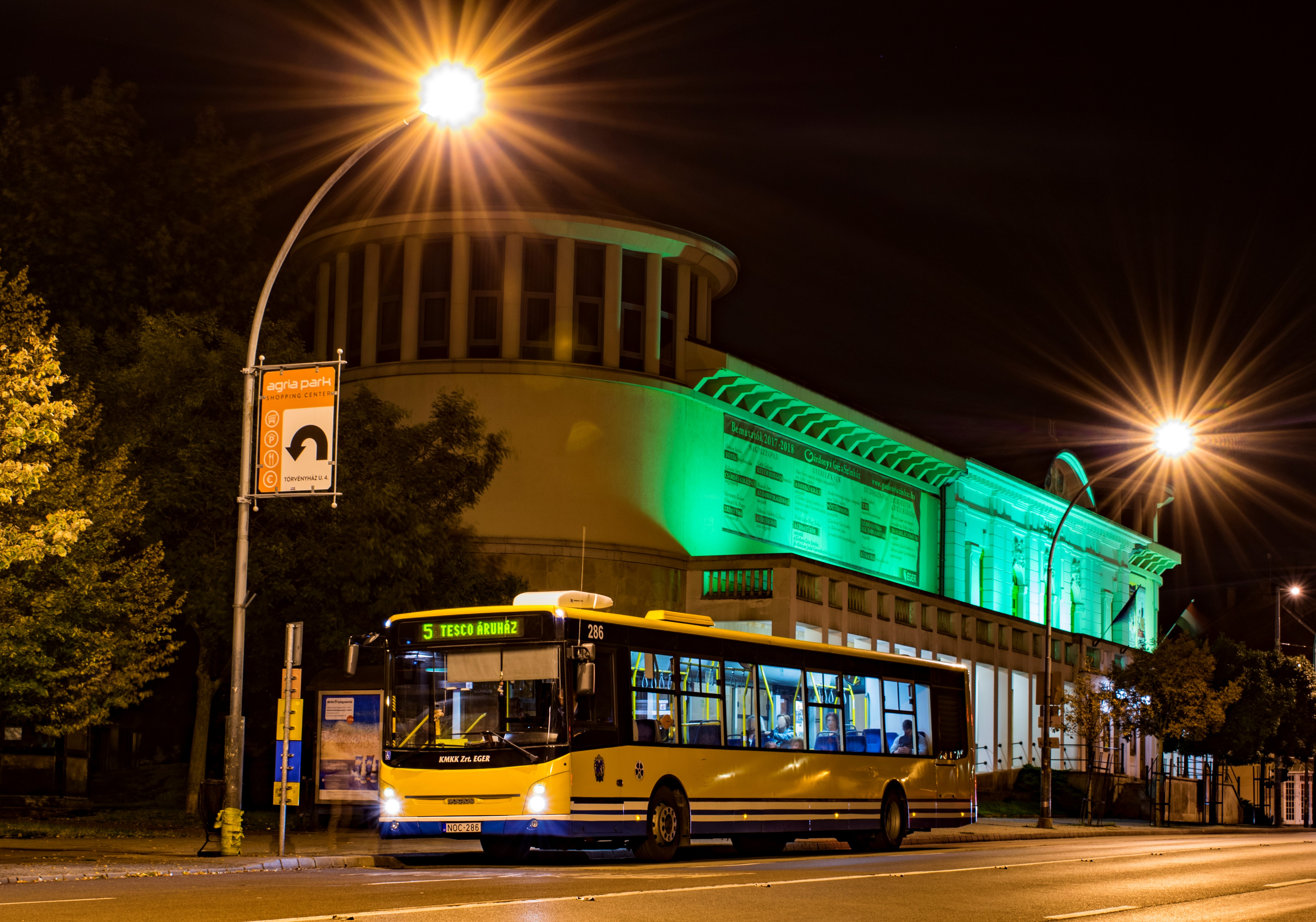
ARC bus on Line 5

The main railway station is located 1.5 km from the town centre. MÁV operates interregio train services to Budapest, and the trip is about 1 1/2 hours. Local trains to Füzesabony and Szilvásvárad also depart from this station.

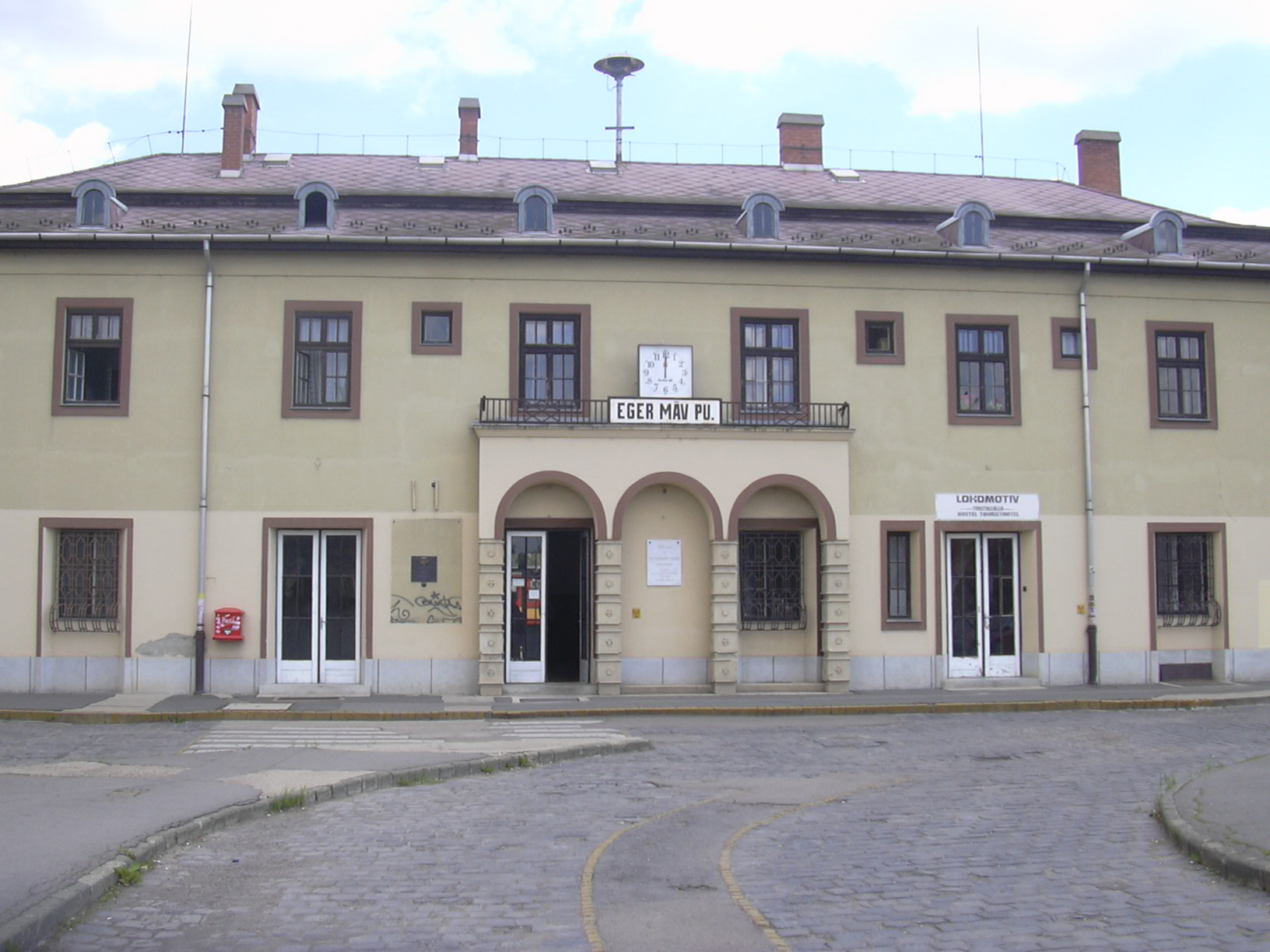
Eger Railway Station

There are also smaller stations located near the castle and in the Felnémet district that are served by the Eger–Szilvásvárad local trains.

=== Coach ===
The bus station is located close to the basilica. Buses depart approx. every 30 minutes to Budapest, and the trip to the capital is about 2 hours. Volánbusz operates an extensive network of suburban and long-distance buses. Other bus companies also offer connections to a variety of destinations. Taking the bus to Felsőtárkány gets you close to several hiking and mountain biking trails.

=== Local bus ===
Volánbusz also operates a fleet of local buses, serving most parts of the town, although the majority of buses run in a north–south direction. Line 12 is the busiest line in the town, and it has stops at the railway station, the bus station and in the town centre.

== Culture ==
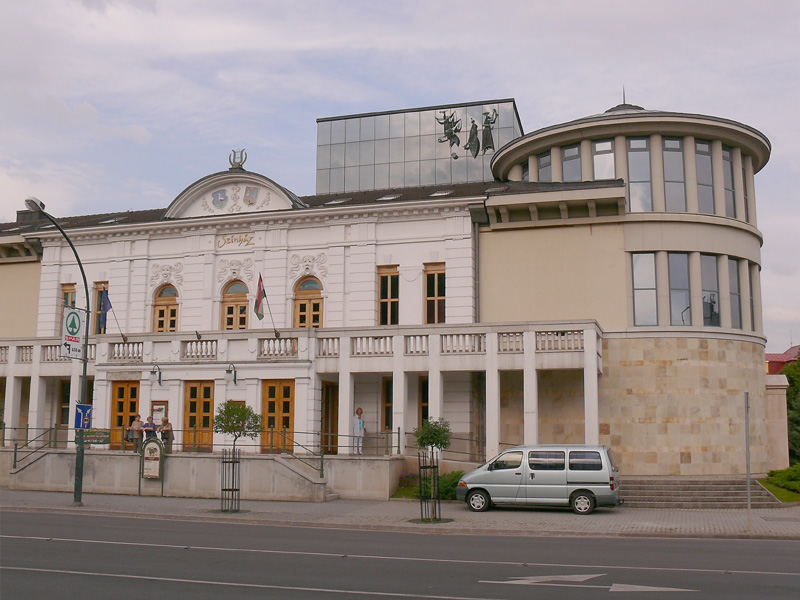
The Géza Gárdonyi Theater was named after the author of the Siege of Eger (1552), Géza Gárdonyi.

== Districts ==
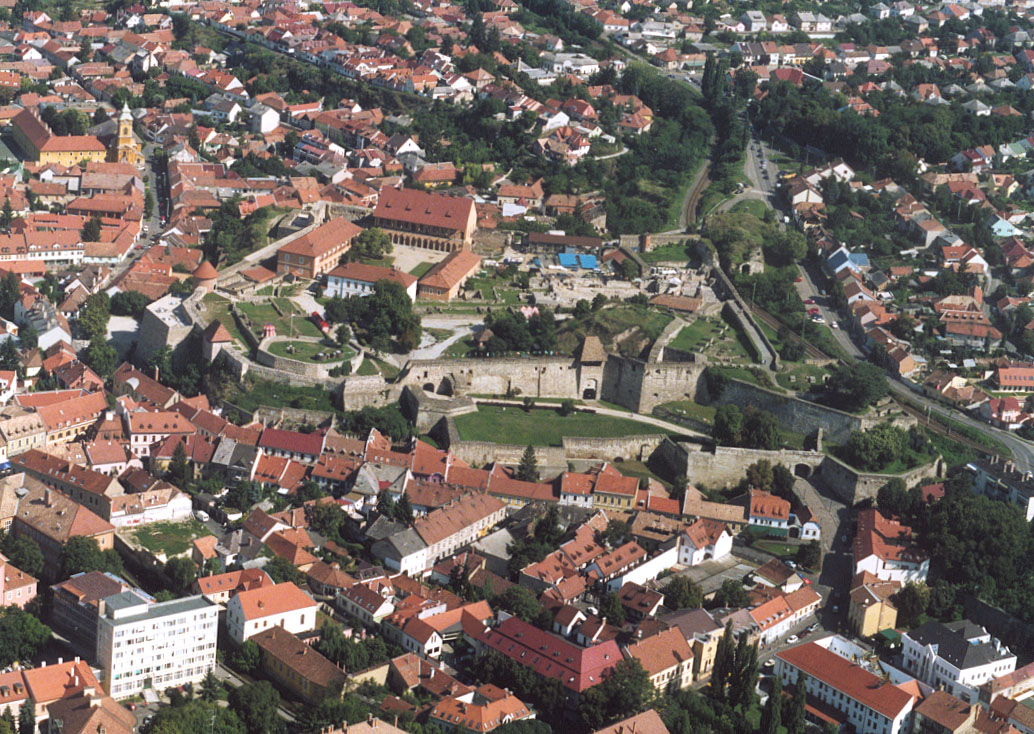
Aerial photography of the Castle and a part of the Downtown, Tetemvár, Almagyar and Cifra hóstya

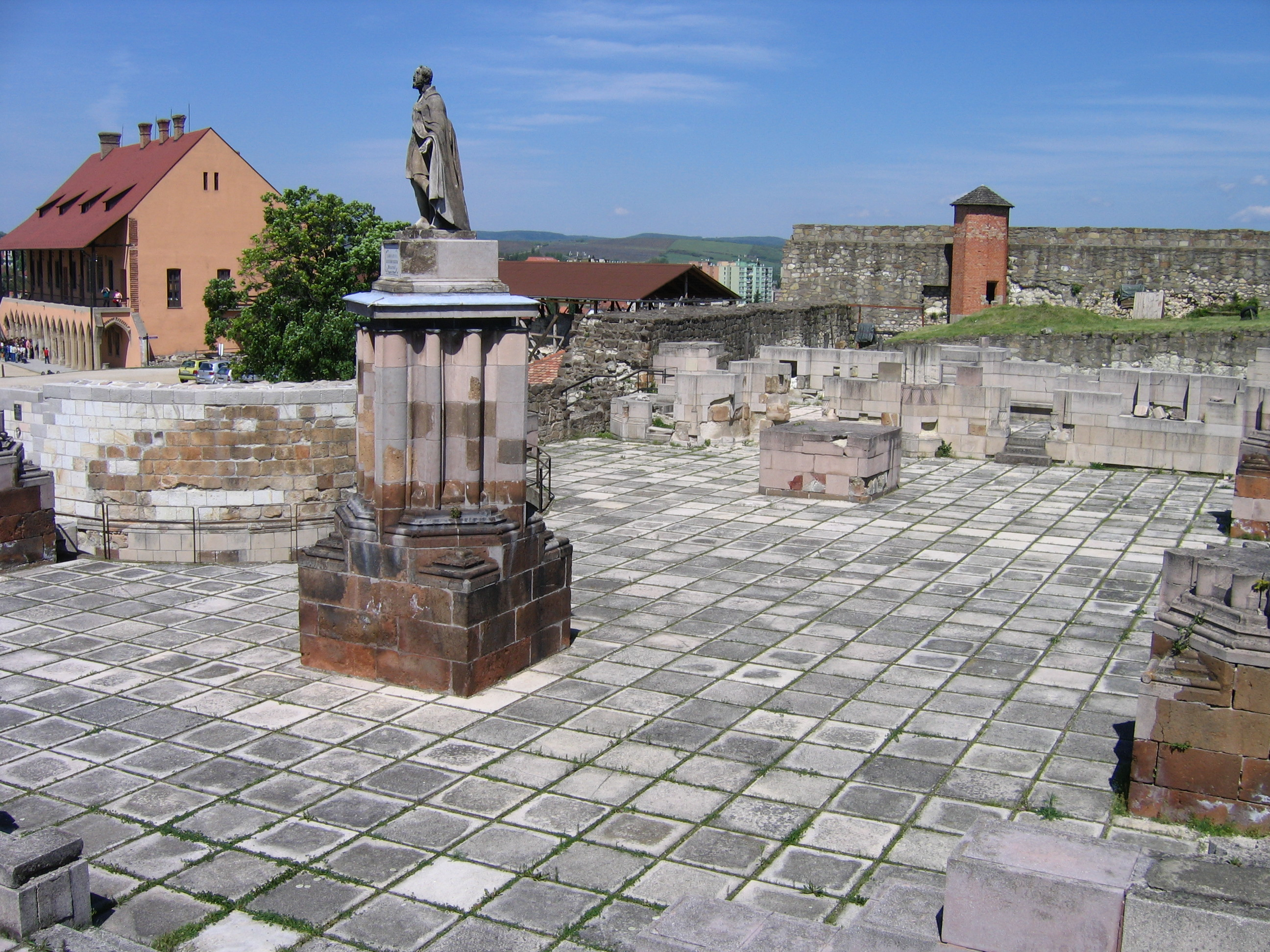
The ruins of the medieval cathedral

(Note: Most of these districts are historical, but they often appear on maps and street signs.)

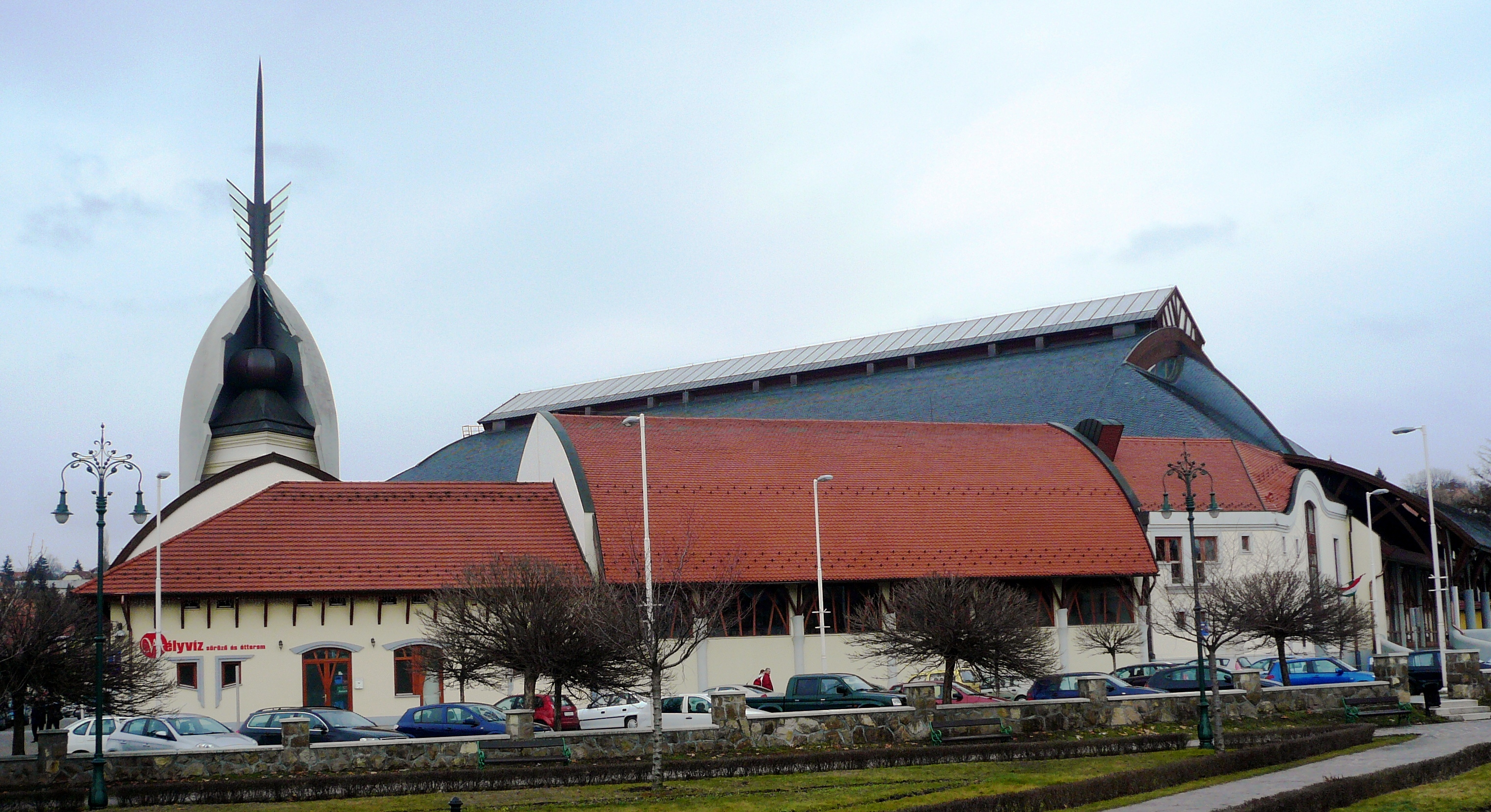
The new swimming pool (architect: Imre Makovecz)

- Almagyar – This hill in the eastern part of the town is one of the smart areas of Eger, near the castle. The streets are steep, but there are fine views. The southern part contains some of the buildings (campus and dormitories) of Eszterházy College.
- Almár – The northernmost part of the town, it consists mainly of weekend cottages and plots for gardeners.
- Belváros (town centre) – The centre of Eger is often called "the Baroque Pearl of Europe". Here are located Dobó tér, the main square of the historical town, surrounded by Baroque houses and St. Anthony's Church. Other historic buildings nearby include the Cathedral and the Lyceum.
- Berva is now a housing estate about 2 km to the NW of Eger. Founded in 1951, it was a huge industrial park by the name of Finomszerelvénygyár, privatized in 1992.
- Castle of Eger – The oldest and most famous part of Eger.
- Cifra hóstya – North of the centre, this part of town is full of small houses and narrow streets. You can find the Firefighters' Museum there.
- Csákó – a suburban area with larger houses, east of the railway station.
- Érsekkert (Bishop's Garden) – The largest park in Eger, with sport facilities, a small lake, and a fountain.
- Felnémet – This village, north of the town, was annexed to Eger in 1961 but still has a rural character. The parish church (1715–1750s, designed by Gianni Battista Carlone, an Italian who settled in Eger) was started by Bishop Gábor Antal Erdődy as a votive church after an outbreak of bubonic plague in 1710, and completed by his successor. It was dedicated to St. Rosalia, a guardian against plague.
- Felsőváros (Upper Town), formerly Csebokszári (Cheboksary – capital town of Chuvash Republic, Russia) – The largest housing estate of Eger, it is full of four and ten-storied concrete buildings, providing homes for one third of the town's population. There are three high schools there.
- Hajdúhegy – a suburban area similar to Almagyar across the valley with downtown being in between these 2 hills.
- Hatvani hóstya – The district is split by Highway 25. It contains the stadium and the Reformed church.
- Industrial zone – Several multinational companies have moved into this area east of Lajosváros.
- Károlyváros (Charles Town) – One of the largest districts of Eger, Károlyváros is west of downtown. It contains the High School for the Health Professions, and the Agria Park Shopping Mall.
- Lajosváros (Louis Town) – This district in the southern part of the town has several high schools and student hostels. It consists mainly of detached houses. Also called Kanada.
- Maklári hóstya, Tihamér – This district is one of the fastest developing parts of the town. It contains public swimming pools (designed by Imre Makovecz).
- Pásztorvölgy – A suburban area in Felnémet. Also has a high school.
- Rác hóstya – Another suburban area west from Upper Town.
- Szépasszonyvölgy ("Valley of the Beautiful Woman") – An area of Eger famous for its red wines (Bikaver or Bulls Blood) and known for its wine cellars.
- Tetemvár – Another suburban area. The name ("Corpses' Castle") derives from the legend that Turkish war dead were buried here in 1552.
- Vécseyvölgy – A suburban area with a small airfield for sports purposes.

== Main sights ==
- The Castle of Eger, noted for its successful defence against the 1552 Ottoman invasion.
- The 17th-century Eger minaret. The northernmost Turkish minaret in Europe is 40 meters high and one of only three survivors in Hungary. It can be climbed for a good view of the town centre.
- The system of cellars near the cathedral, called the Város a város alatt (literally "Town under the town").
- Dobó tér. The Baroque Minorite Church (1758–67), built to the designs of Kilian Ignaz Dientzenhofer of Prague with original ceiling frescoes by Márton Reindl, is the focal point of the town's most imposing square, flanked by the Town Hall and the old priory buildings, part of which contain the Palóc Museum, showing the artefacts of a distinctive regional ethnic community. The square and several of the retail streets around it are pedestrianized.
- The Lyceum (Eszterházy College), designed by József Gerl and Jakab Fellner and built in 1765–85, is a splendid example of the restrained Zopf style. There are three remarkable 18th-century frescoed ceilings, of which only the one in the library is open to the public. Painted by the Viennese artist Johann Lukas Kracker in 1778, it depicts the Council of Trent of 1545–63, which launched the Counter-Reformation. Among the figures depicted are the Reformers Luther and Zwingli, whose "heretical" books are being struck by a bolt of lightning. After the death of Kracker in 1779, Esterházy commissioned the Austrian Franz Sigrist (1727–1803) to complete the painting programme. Sigrist painted the ceiling in the Great Hall of the west bay representing the four university faculties (1781–1782). The beautifully furnished library opened in 1793. There is a camera obscura or periscope at the top of the building, projecting images of the town onto a table.
- The hamam (bathhouse), commissioned by Abdi Pasha the Albanian
- The Provost Minor's Palace, 1758, is the finest Rococo building in the town. It also has a fine fresco by Kracker ("The Triumph of Virtue over Sin"), other 18th-century murals, and remarkable 18th-century wrought ironwork.
- The Archbishop's Garden
- The Fazola gates, late Baroque wrought ironwork by Henrik Fazola
- The Archbishop's Palace, a 15th-century Gothic palace
- The Egri Road Beatles Múzeum was established in Hotel Korona, in the heart of the historic town of Eger. Guests can get a glimpse of the life and career of the band and its members in the frames of a professional guided tour, which provides an experience supported by up-to-date technical solutions. Films and contemporary newsreels are played on screens and the songs of the band can be listened to through headphones, whereas contemporary media publications, garments, models and limited edition rarities are displayed in the showcases. The monumental show of the Sgt. Pepper album, various games and photo-taking activities take the visitors back to the legendary sixties.
- Szépasszonyvölgy ("The Valley of the Beautiful Woman"). A valley on the southern edge of Eger which has numerous wine cellars, many with their own wine bar catering to tourists. A tram shuttles tourists to/from Dobó tér in the summer months.

=== Churches ===
Eger has 17 churches, but the notable ones include:

- The cathedral or basilica, built in 1831–37 to Classicist designs by József Hild, contains some remarkable painting and sculpture. Late morning organ recitals are held frequently.
- The Minorite Church, 18th-century Baroque church
- The Serbian Orthodox Church of St. Nicholas (Rác-templom) is in Zopf style (1784–86). The interior was commissioned from Viennese artists by the rich local Serbian community of that time. It is dominated by an iconostasis.
- St Bernard Cistercian Church, 18th-century Baroque church

== Population ==
Historical population
Year	Pop.	±%
1787	16,852	—
1850	16,858	+0.0%
1870	19,150	+13.6%
1891	22,427	+17.1%
1900	25,893	+15.5%
1910	28,052	+8.3%
1920	28,753	+2.5%
1930	30,424	+5.8%
1941	32,482	+6.8%
1949	31,844	−2.0%
1960	38,610	+21.2%
1970	47,960	+24.2%
1980	60,897	+27.0%
1990	61,576	+1.1%
2001	58,331	−5.3%
2011	56,569	−3.0%
2022	49,113	−13.2%

== Politics ==
The current mayor of Eger is Ádám Mirkóczki (Egységben a Városért Egyesület).

The local Municipal Assembly, elected at the 2019 local government elections, is made up of 18 members (1 Mayor, 12 Individual constituencies MEPs and 5 Compensation List MEPs) divided into this political parties and alliances:

Party	Seats	Current Municipal Assembly
Unity for the City (Note: Supported by Opposition coalition.)	10	M
Fidesz-KDNP	6	
City Guards Eger	1	
Our Homeland Movement	1	

== International relations ==
Turkey has an honorary consulate in the city.

=== Twin towns – sister cities ===
Eger is twinned with:

- Cheboksary, Russia
- Dolný Kubín, Slovakia
- Esslingen am Neckar, Germany
- Gheorgheni, Romania
- Jericho, Palestine
- Kutná Hora, Czech Republic
- Mâcon, France
- Mukachevo, Ukraine
- Peja, Kosovo
- Pori, Finland
- Przemyśl, Poland
- Sarzana, Italy

== Notable people ==
- Aaron Wise, rabbi and father of Stephen Samuel Wise
- Péter Ács, chess grandmaster
- Therese Benedek, Hungarian-American psychoanalyst
- Aladár Bitskey, swimmer and trainer
- Balázs Erdélyi, water polo player
- Eva Erdelyi, swimmer
- Géza Gárdonyi, historical novelist
- Anna Gyarmati, snowboarder
- Morris Koenig, Hungarian-American lawyer and judge
- Kati Kovács, pop-rock singer
- Klaudia Kovacs, film and theatre director
- Norbert Madaras, water polo player, Olympic winner
- Shimon Sofer, Rav of Eger
- Yochanan Sofer, Erlauer Rebbe
- Réka Szemerkényi, Ambassador to the United States
- Gergő Zalánki, water polo player
- Balázs Holló, Hungarian 2020 Olympic swimmer

== Sport ==
- Egri Dózsa SE, a defunct association football club (1950–1976)
- Egri FC, a defunct association football club (2005–2014)
- FC Eger, a defunct association football club (1977–2003)
- Eger SE, an association football club (2008–present)

== See also ==
- Stars of Eger
