= Egerszóláti Olaszrizling =

Hungarian white wine

Egerszóláti Olaszrizling is one of the traditional white wines of the Eger wine region. The wine is made of grapes of the variety called Olaszrizling (outside Hungary more commonly known as Welschriesling) and originated from the village Egerszólát.

== History ==
It used to be one of the well-known Eger white wines in the Hungarian market before the Communist regime. After 1945 it became a victim of the socialist farming focus on quantity instead of quality. Attempts to rediscover this wine were made by some Eger wine-makers in the late 1990s. It is planned to award Egerszóláti Olaszrizling the DHC-status (DHC is the Hungarian AOC-system, under construction).

== Regulations ==
Egerszóláti Olaszrizling is a quality white wine. The maximal yield can reach 5 hl/ha (45 imp gal/acre), though most producers follow stricter practice: their vineyards yield 15–50 hl/ha (130–450 imp gal/acre). The wine is to get the DHC status when the Eger DHC-system is set.

== Climate ==
The climate of Egerszólát is similar to that of the other parts of Eger: the annual mean temperature is 10.1 °C (50.2 °F). Eger is among the coolest wine regions of Hungary. The average annual amount of rainfall of the last 40 years is 595 mm (23.4 in), while the sun shines 2100 to 2200 hours a year.

== Soil ==
The soil is brown forest soil with riolit tuff underneath.

== Wines ==
Egerszóláti Olaszrizling is a full-bodied white wine with nice acids. It is the best when fermented and aged in oak for a few months. Bottle ageing pays off well. It is the best 2 to 3 years after harvest.
