= Eger wine region =

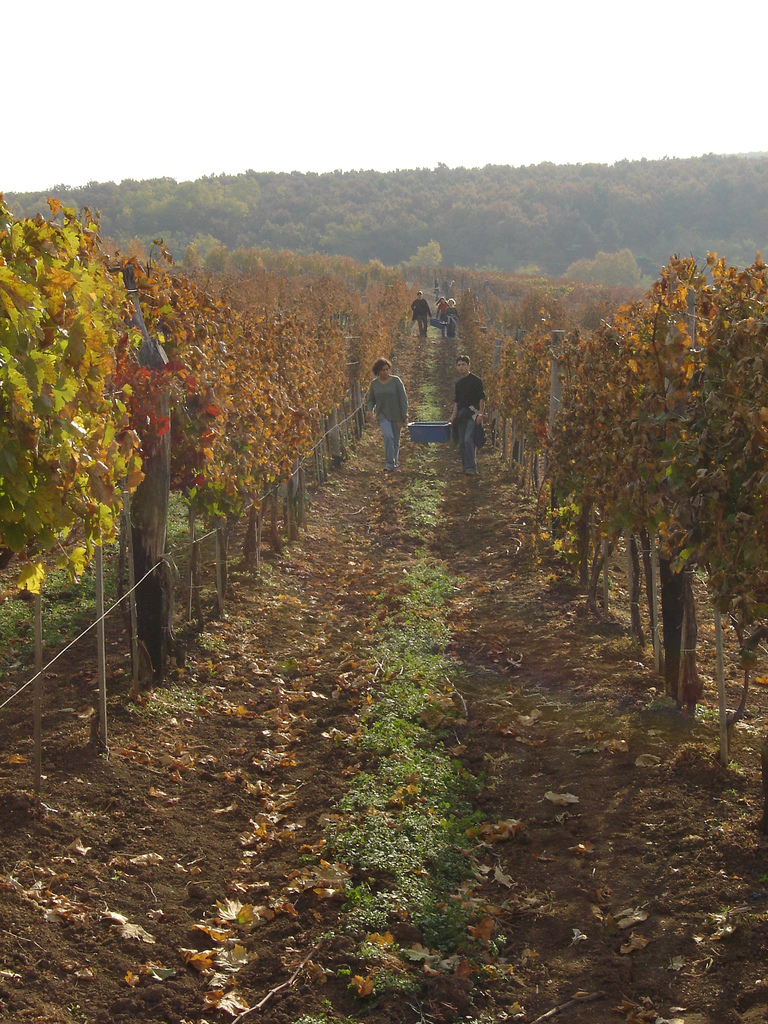
Vineyard in Eger.

Eger wine region (Hungarian: Egri borvidék) is a Hungarian wine region in North-Eastern Hungary. It is famous for its red blend, Egri Bikavér and for some whites like Egri Leányka, Debrői Hárslevelű or Egerszóláti Olaszrizling. Its center is the town of Eger.

== The Eger wine region ==
The some 5400 hectares of vineyards of the Eger wine region is located on the southern slopes of the Bükk Mountains . The wine region is divided into two districts of protected origins: the Eger and the Debrő districts, thus embracing the town of Eger and the following 19 villages: Andornaktálya, Demjén, Egerbakta, Egerszalók, Egerszólát, Felsőtárkány, Kerecsend, Maklár, Nagytálya, Noszvaj, Novaj, Ostoros and Szomolya in the Eger, and Aldebrő, Feldebrő, Tófalu, Verpelét, Kompolt and Tarnaszentmária in the Debrő district.

The town of Eger and its surroundings are a famous historical wine region. The residents have been involved in grape and wine production for almost a thousand years, producing such wines as Egri Bikavér, Egri Leányka, Debrői Hárslevelű, Egri Chardonnay, Egri Cabernet Franc and Sauvignon, Egri Merlot, Egri Kékfrankos and Kékmedoc. After the change of regime, the Eger wine region went through an extraordinarily fast development. Through the re-planting of the traditional and new types in the best production areas, the area of the vine-lands has grown significantly (Nagy-Eged, Pajdos). The AOC system operating in developed, western wine-cultures has been adopted. In addition to the one large state winemaking company, through the establishment and development of several hundred medium- and small-sized wine-companies, the quality of the wines of the wine region has improved significantly. Though the age of the oldest wine cellars is over 400 years, new cellars are still being cut even nowadays.

== Climate ==
A characteristic feature of the climate is that spring comes relatively late and the climate is of a dry nature.

== Soil ==
Black coloured riolite, formed on the hill-sides and hill-slopes, mostly on Miocene-age riolite tufa, as well as clay slate and riolite, poor in lime, brown soils, clay-infused soil, brown forest soils, etc.

== Grape varieties ==
Among the grape varieties grown in the Eger region including Bianca, Bouvier and Eger 2 (an offspring of Villard blanc). Egri Leányka, Egri Olaszrizling, Egri Chardonnay, Egri Kékfrankos, Egri Cabernet Franc, Egri Cabernet Sauvignon, Egri Merlot, Egri Syrah, Egri Pinot Noir, Furmint

== History ==
Eger has been populated since the 10th century and must have been a significant-sized settlement as early as the beginning of the 11th century. One of the first bishoprics was founded in Eger by king Szent István. The monks moving to the bishopric also brought along from their countries the grape types indigenous there.

The Tartar invasion decimated the population. King Béla IV settled Walloons here, who introduced their knowledge of grape production and wine-making (e.g. the use of barrels).

The clearings of the slopes around Eger were planted with grapes in the 13th and 14th centuries. The Cistercian monks moving in used these grapes to satisfy their demand for wine.

The role of the town in the first centuries of the Hungarian Middle Ages was truly significant: one of the largest bishoprics had its seat in the castle, to which not only Heves County but the whole north-eastern part of the country belonged. The initiation and development of wine-growing can be put down to the central, managing role of the church as wine is an indispensable element of church ceremonies. By virtue of the king's decree, tenths, tithe had to be paid to the church and worldly institutions from wine-growing. The first cellars were built to store the tithe.

Serbs fleeing from the Turks brought along the technology of fermentation sur marc, red wine making and the Kadarka type as well.

In the 16th century, the people of Eger defended their city during the Siege of Eger (1552) from the invading Turks. The legend goes that they were emboldened by a red liquid covering their beards, and the Turks retreated thinking that the soldiers of Eger had drunk Bikavér (bull's blood). Subsequently, Egri Bikavér (bull's blood of Eger), a bold-flavored red blend, became the region's most historically famous wine.

After decades of unsuccessful sieges, the Turks took the Eger castle in 1596 and held it for 91 years. In spite of this, grape production survived. The reason for this is that though the Turks themselves did not consume wine, it was a significant source of income.

In the 17th century, red wine grape types were gaining more and more grounds at the expense of white wine grapes. In 1687, the castle was taken back from the Turks. During the course of the rapid population of the town and its surroundings, the grape mono-culture was established in two decades. Most of the presently used names of the grape hills were formed at the end of the 17th century and in the 18th century.

In 1886, phylloxera appeared in Eger, wiping out the grapes almost completely. During the course of re-planting (reconstruction), new types were also introduced to the wine region. Following this, the tendency is similar to that of other wine regions.

Upon the re-planting of the vineyards completely wiped out, the intention was to adopt also types not known earlier. In the past decade, Eger winemakers proved abroad as well that the juice of the Leányka, Királyleányka, Hárslevelű, Olaszrizling, Muskotály, Tramini, Szürkebarát and Chardonnay grapes grown here withstands competition with any domestic or foreign competitor. According to experts, the wines of the Eger Kékfrankos, Blauburger, Merlot, Cabernet Franc, Pinot Noir and Syrah grapes can also expect great international success if the possibilities of this region are utilised well by the winemakers.

== The Vineyards of Eger Wine district ==
Eger

Certified vineyard names for Superior Wine: Áfrika, Agárdi, Almár-völgy, Bajusz-völgy, Bánya-tető, Békési, Benke-lápa, Braun-völgy, Cigléd, Cinege, Déllés, Dobrányi, Donát, Érseki, Erzsébet-völgy, Fehér-hegy, Felső-galagonyás, Fertő, Grőber-völgy, Gyilkos, Hajdú-hegy, Hergyimó, Kerékkötő, Kis-galagonyás, Kis-Kocs, Kolompos, Kolompos-völgy, Kőlyuk-tető, Kutya-hegy, Losonci-völgy, Makjány, Marinka, Mész-hegy, Mezey alsó, Nagy-galagonyás, Nagy-Kocs, Nyerges, Nyúzó, Öreg-hegy, Pap-hegy, Pirittyó, Posta út, Rác-hegy, Rádé, Répás-tető, Steiner, Szarkás, Szépasszony-völgy, Szőlőcske, Szőlőske, Tiba, Tibrik, Tihamér, Tornyos, Tót-hegy, Új-fogás, Vécsey-völgy, Vidra Certified vineyard names for Grand Superior Wine: Almagyar, Bajusz, Birka, Gőzmalmos, Grőber, Kis-Eged, Kőporos, Merengő, Mezey öreg, Nagy-Eged-dűlő, Nagy-Eged-hegy (Nagy-Eged Hill), Rózsás, Sík-hegy, Vizes-hegy

Noszvaj

Certified vineyard names for Superior Wine: Dóc, Herceg, Hosszú-szél, Kőkötő, Perzselő, Pipis, Szeles-oldal, Szeles-tető, Zsidó-szél Certified vineyard names for Grand Superior Wine: Csókás, Nagyfai, Nyilas-már, Tekenő-hát
