= Érd minaret =

Minaret tower in Érd, Hungary

Coordinates: 47°21′39″N 18°56′18″E

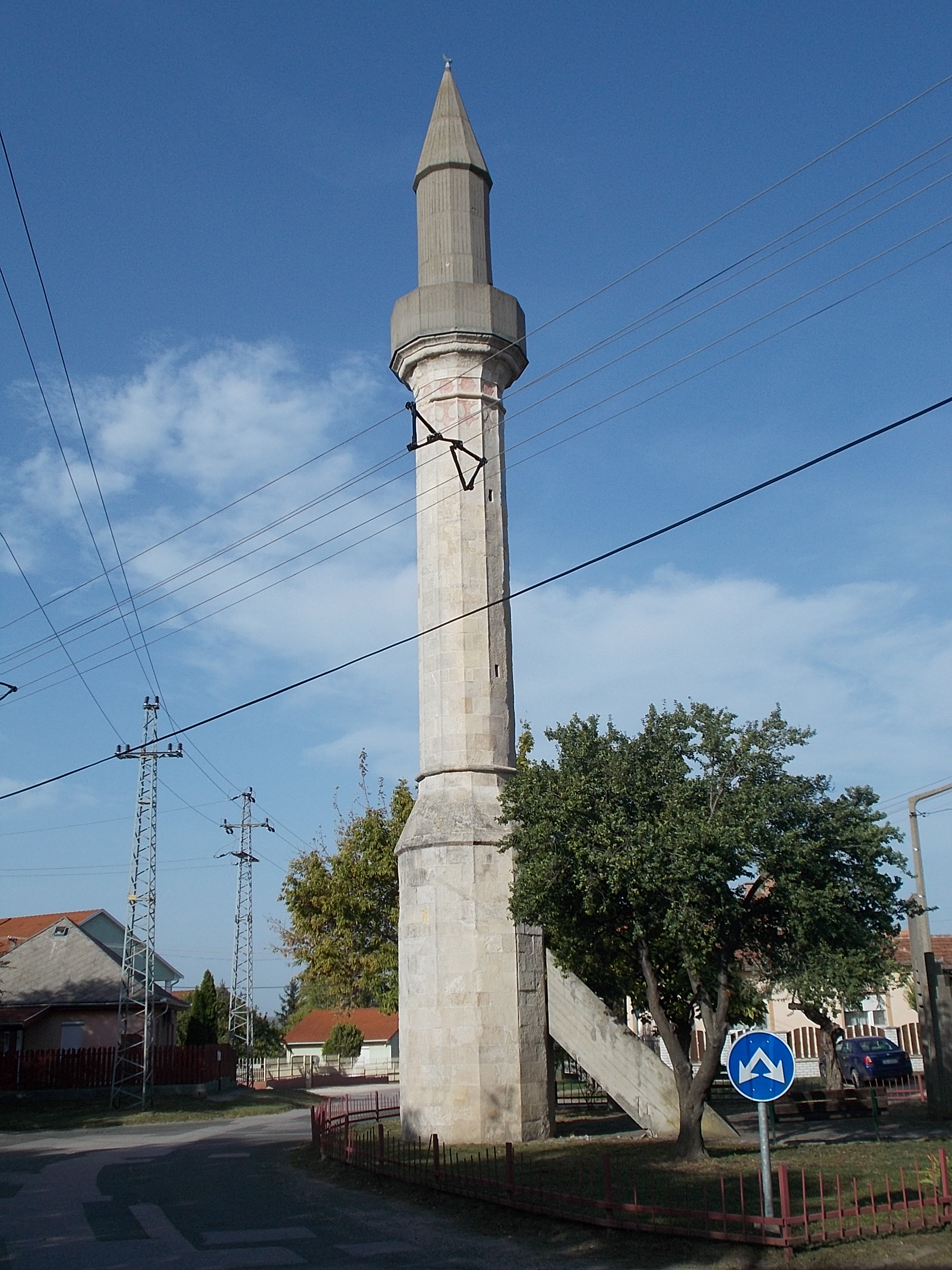
The Érd minaret in 2015

The Érd minaret (Hungarian: Érdi minaret) is an Ottoman era minaret tower situated in Érd near capital Budapest in Hungary. It is one of only three Ottoman era minarets still surviving in Hungary. The other two are the Eger minaret and the minaret of Yakovalı Hasan Paşa Mosque in Pécs.

The minaret is 23 metres (75 feet) tall and constructed with limestone. It was built in the 17th century as part of a mosque by Ottoman Muslims and use for the Muslim call to prayer (Adhan). The minaret is a registered monument of Hungary with identification 7014 and reference number 7012.

The minaret stands alone in Érd-Ófalu, near the dam of the Danube, next to a trace of an ancient Roman military road. This road is still called Mecset Street, which means "Mosque Street", a subtle reference to the mosque that one stood there.

== History ==
The minaret in Érd was built in 17th century as part of a Turkish mosque in Érd. The mosque no longer exists but descriptions survive. The historian József Molnár gives features of the mosque as a rectangular ornate building with colorful windows, carpets and a Mihrab (prayer niche) opposite the entrance of a stone-framed door. There was a balcony protected by wooden bars, where the muezzin (crier who makes the Islamic call to prayer) made his way to the minaret.

A copy of the mosque Mihrab (prayer niche) made with iron reinforced concrete has been re-erected near the minaret.

== Architecture ==
The structure of the minaret tower consists of a free standing cylindrical base, conical transition and a polygonal upper part. The middle and top closures are restorations and reconstructions. Entrance opening is segmented and is located higher off the ground.

== Gallery ==
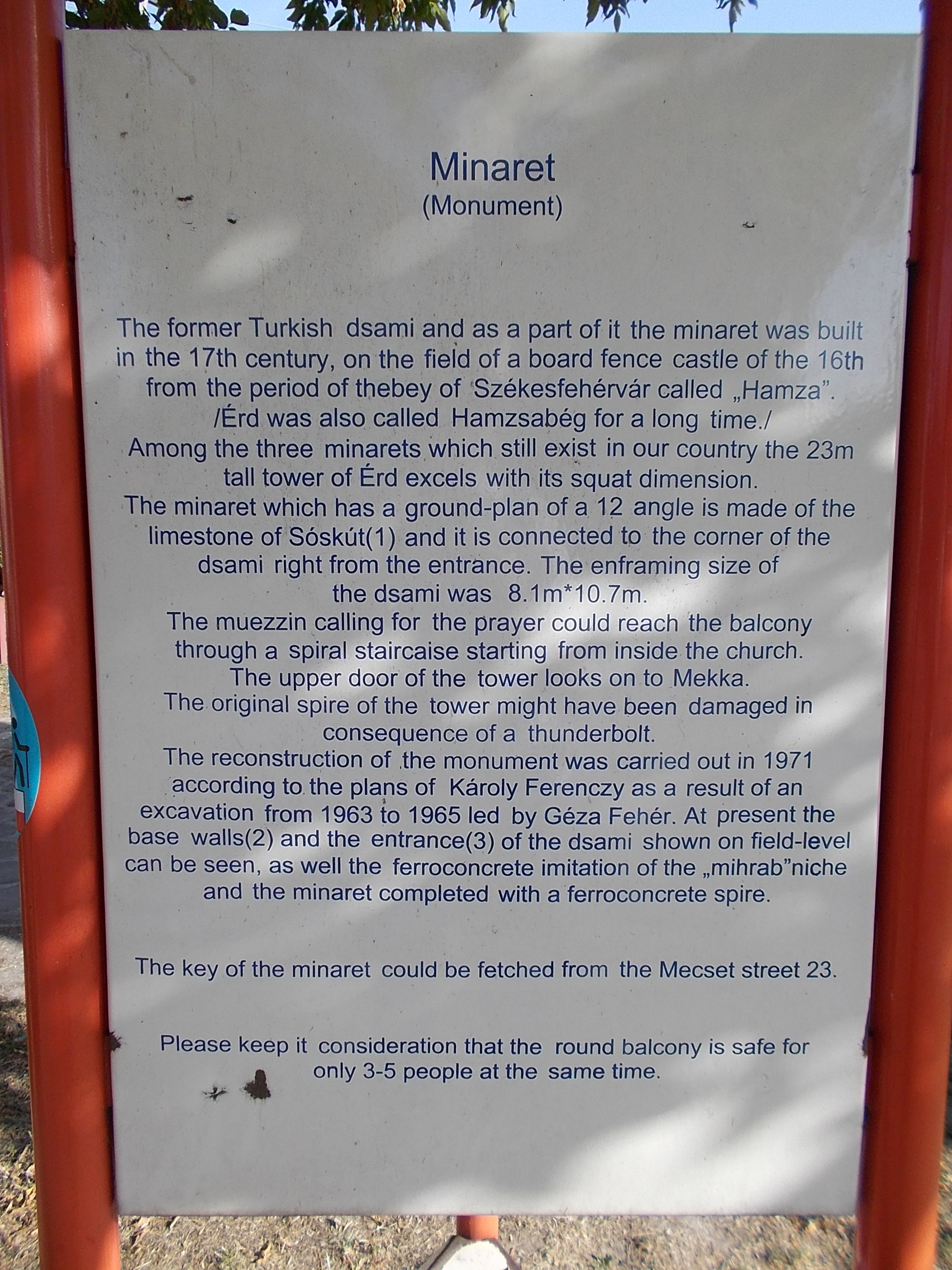
A description plaque in English on site.

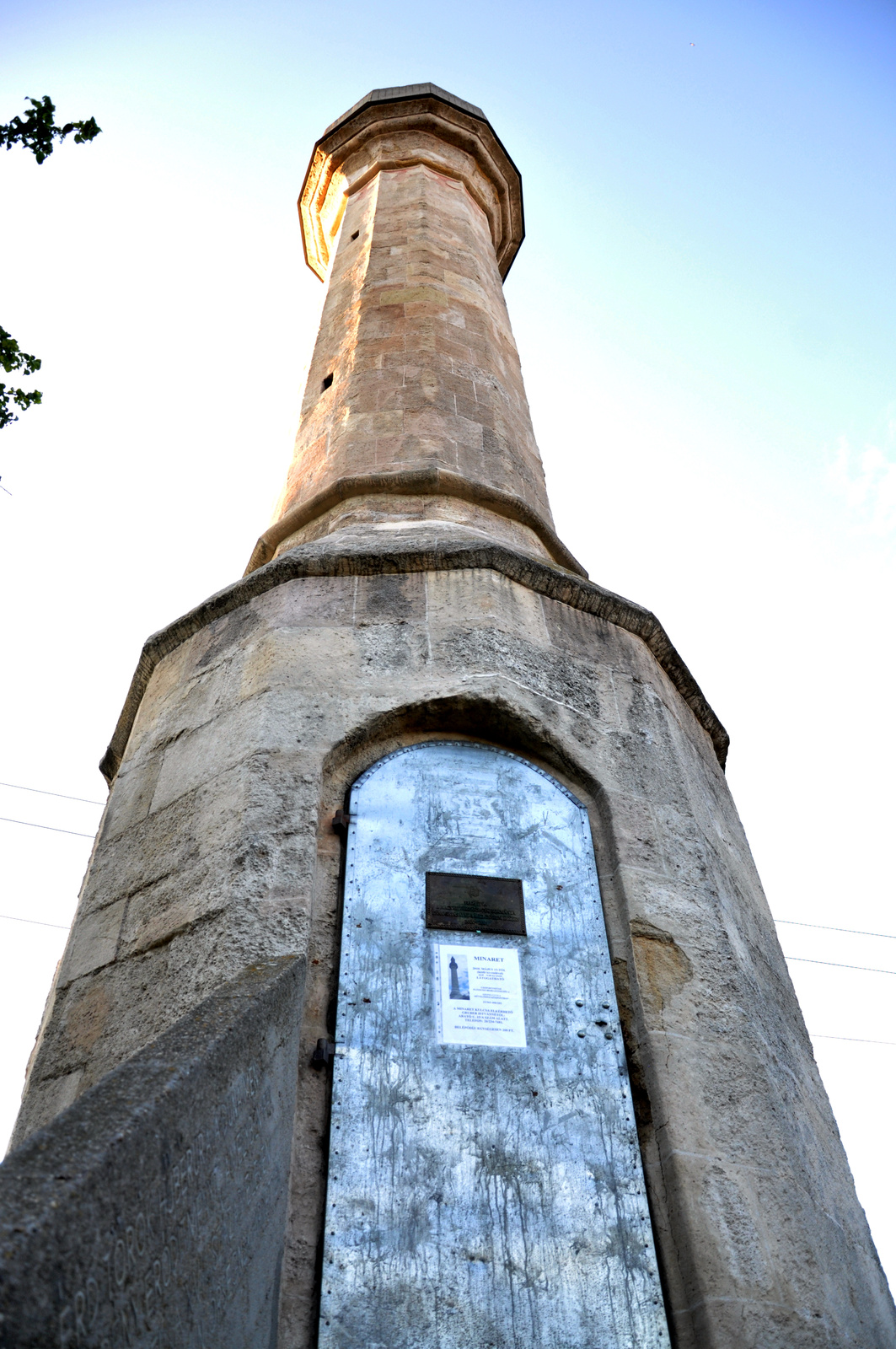
Minaret entrance.

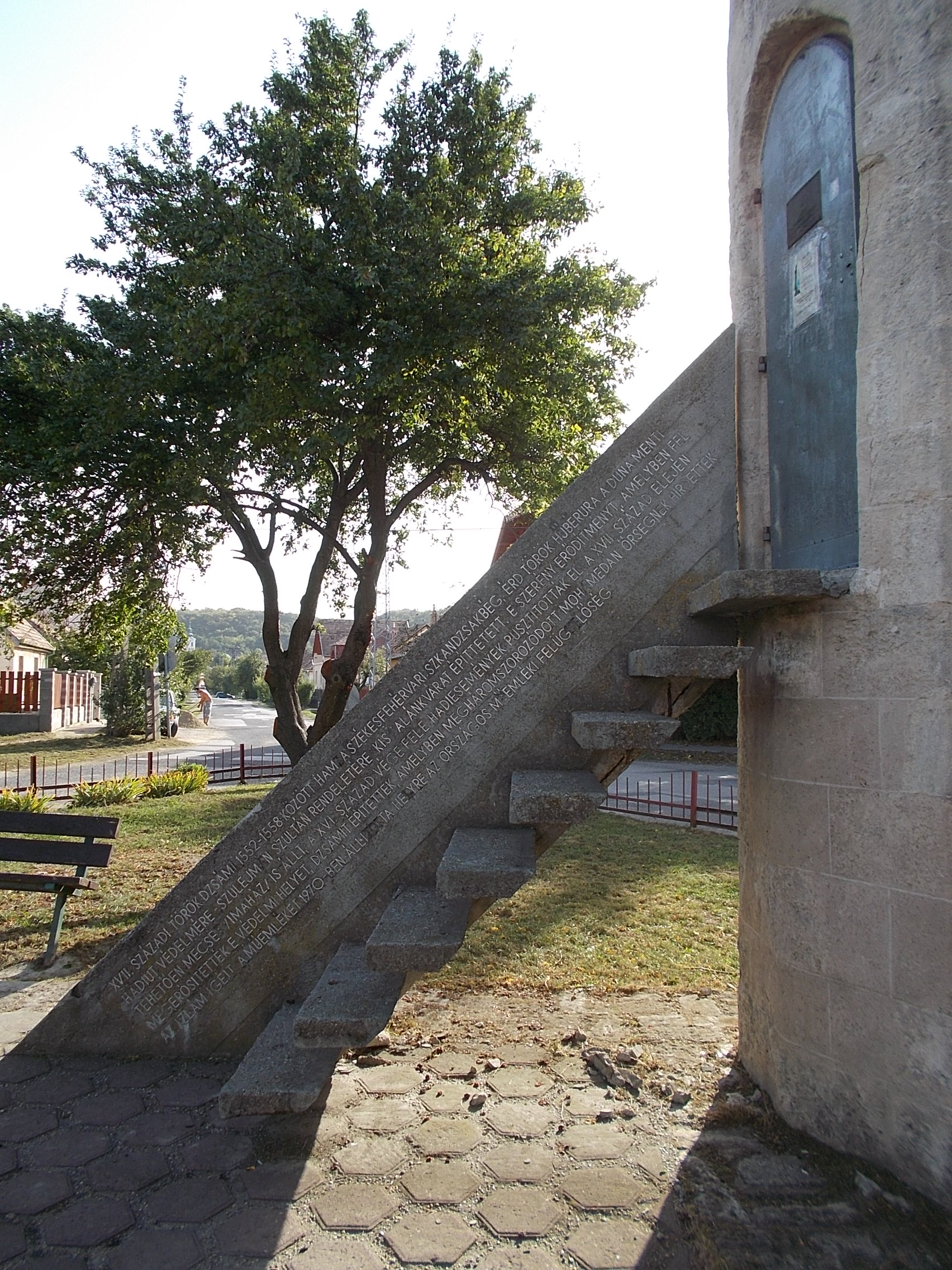
Staircase to minaret entrance.

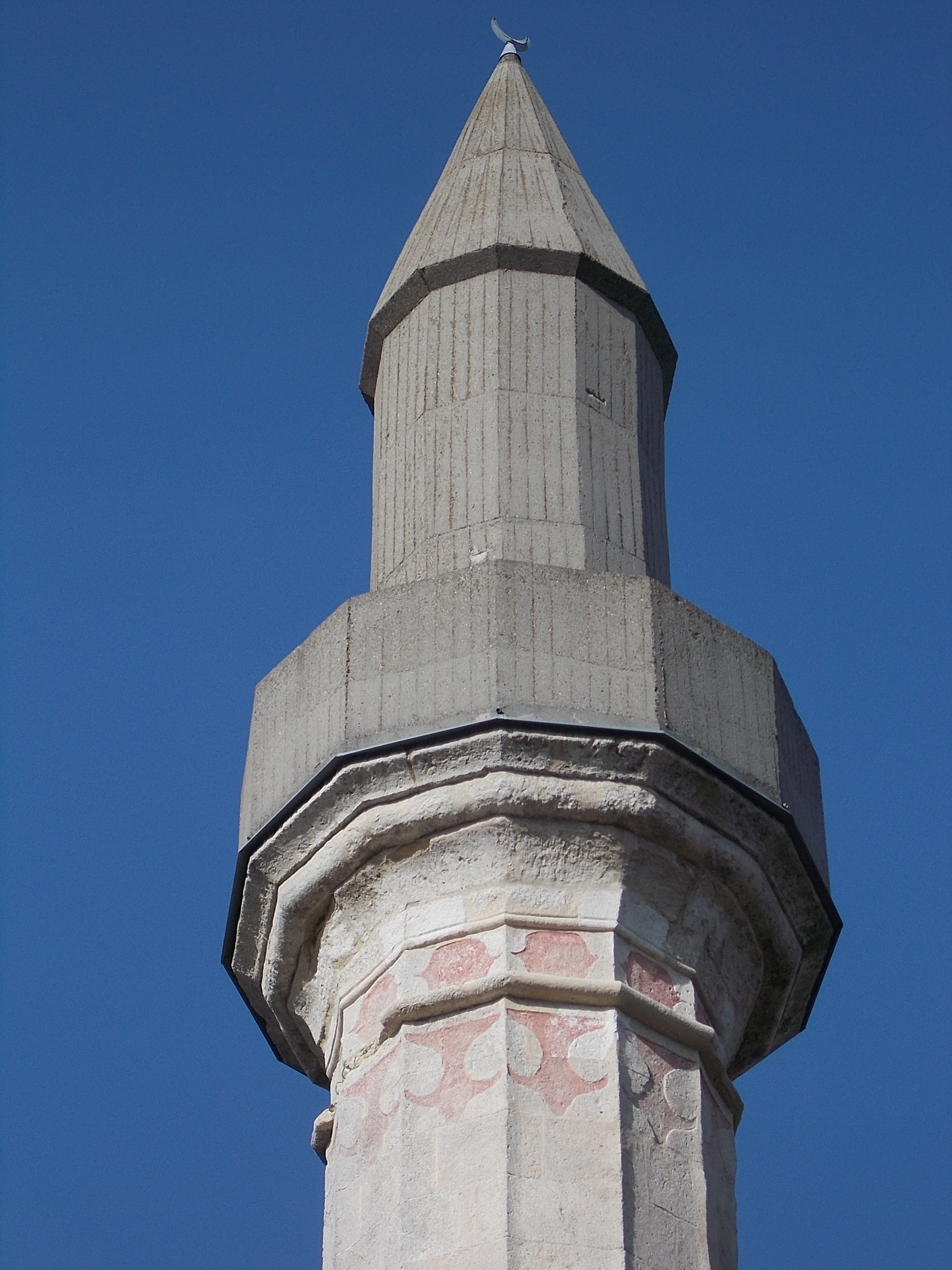
Upper section of minaret, a reconstruction.

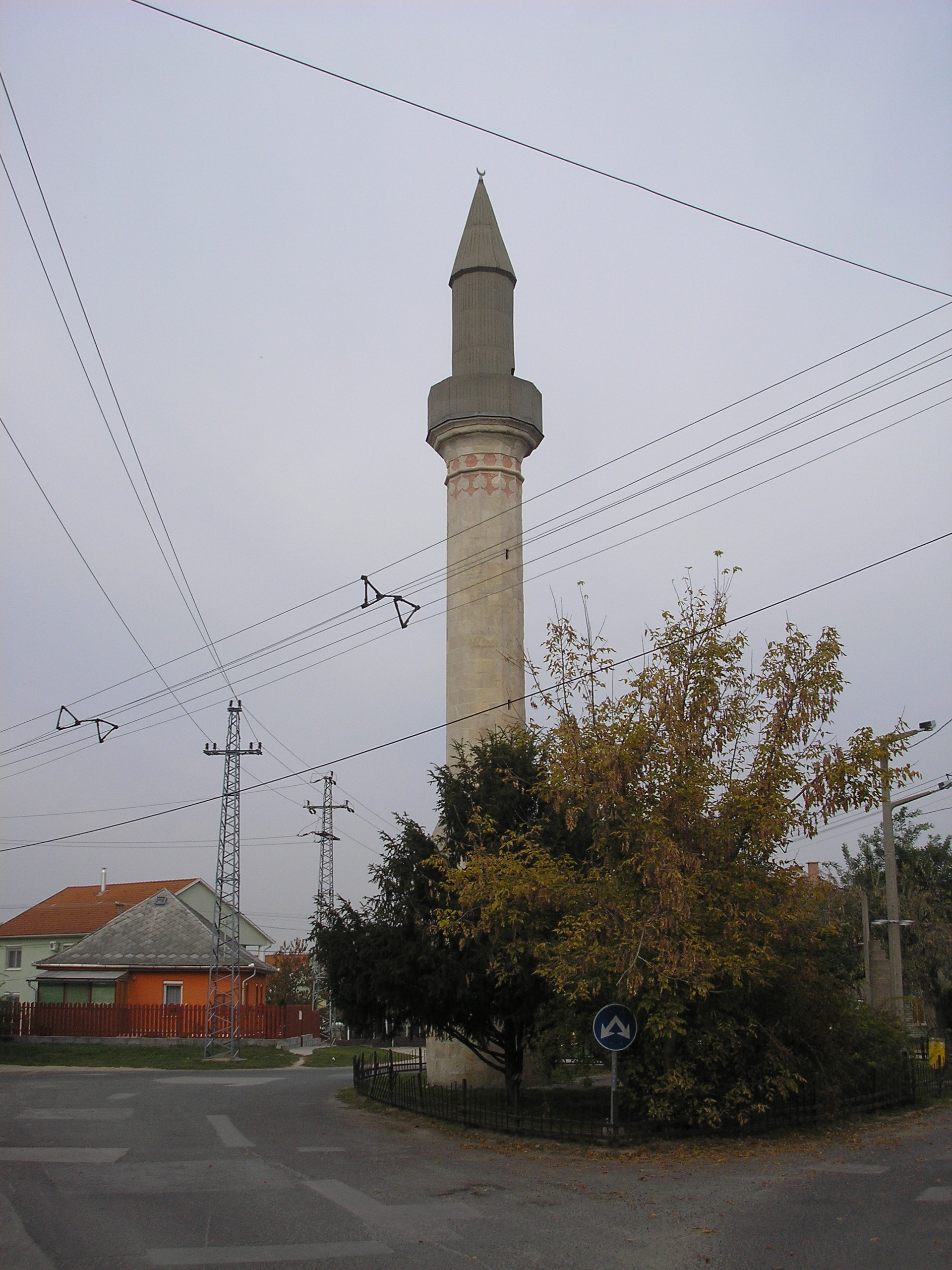

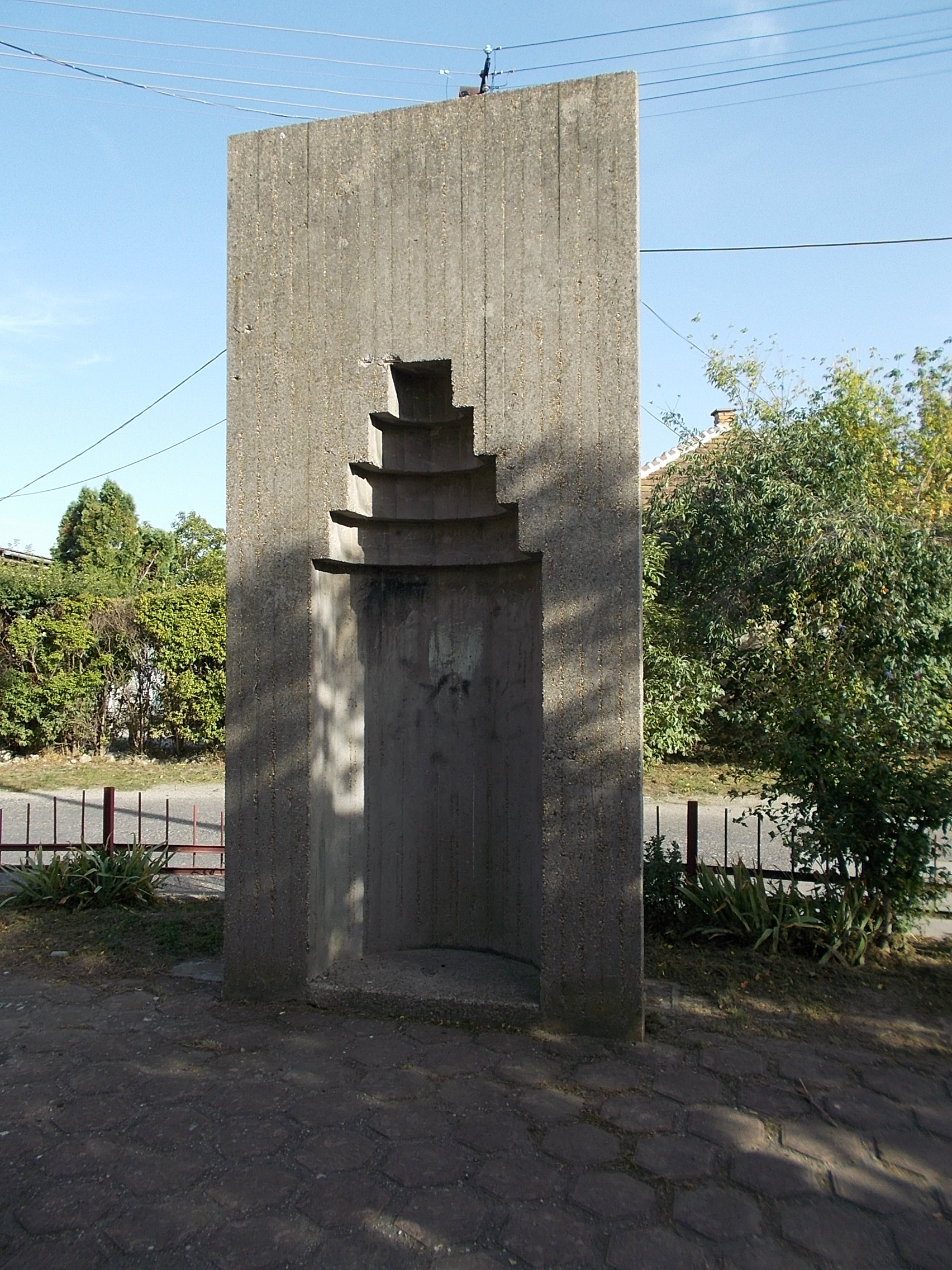
Copy of Mihrab made by Iron forced concrete.

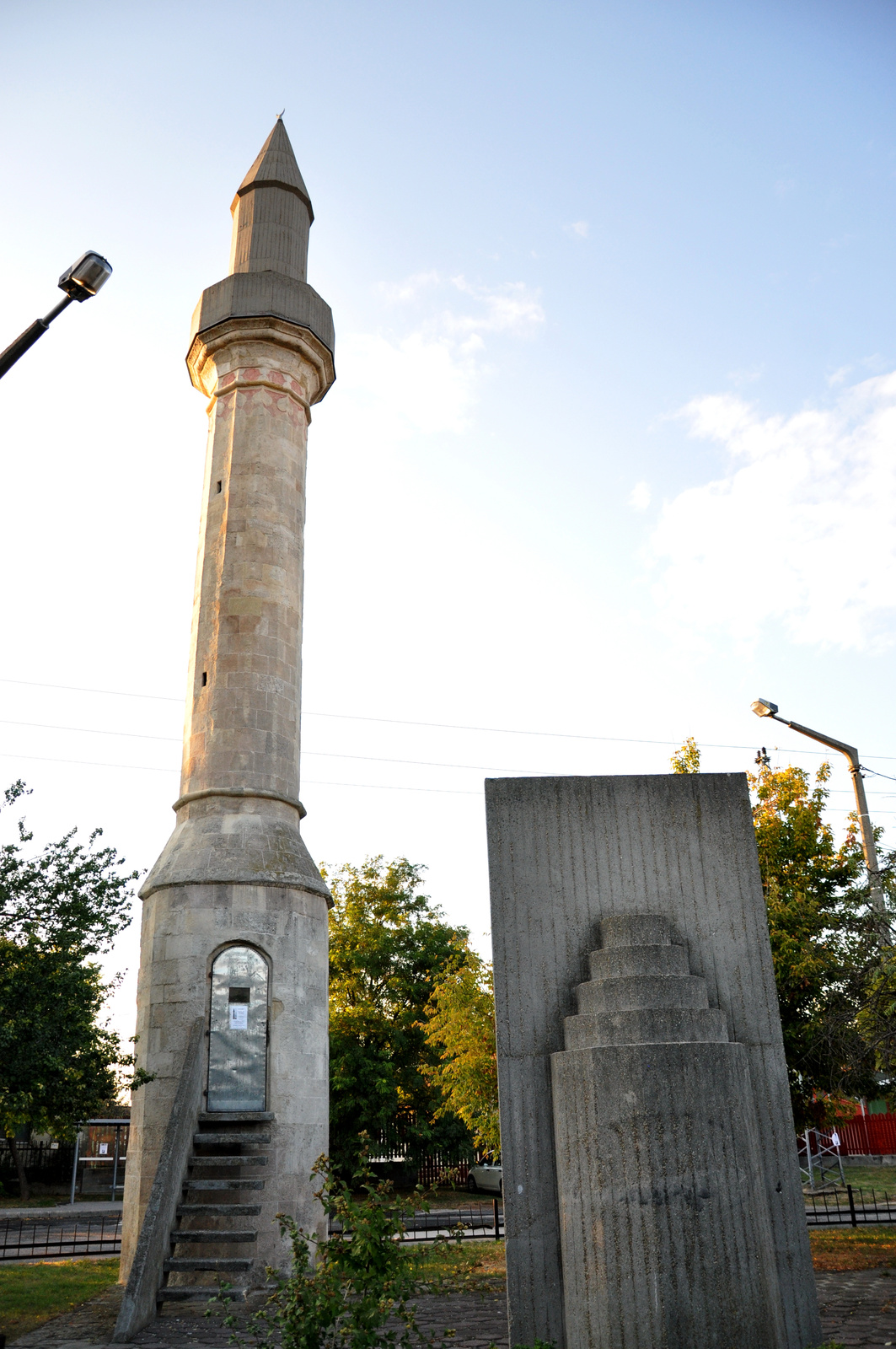
Minaret and Mihrab (Prayer niche).

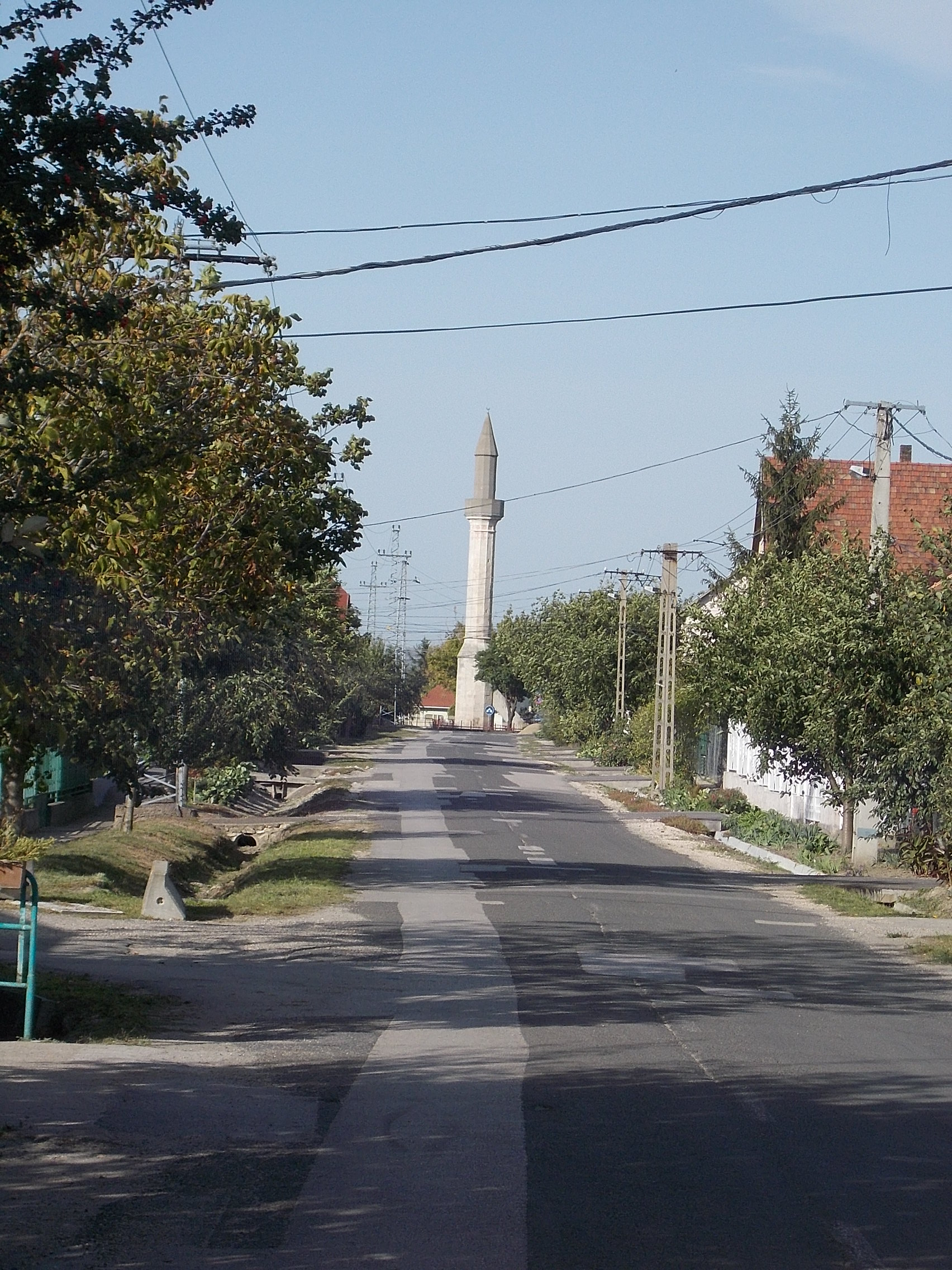
The minaret from a distance.

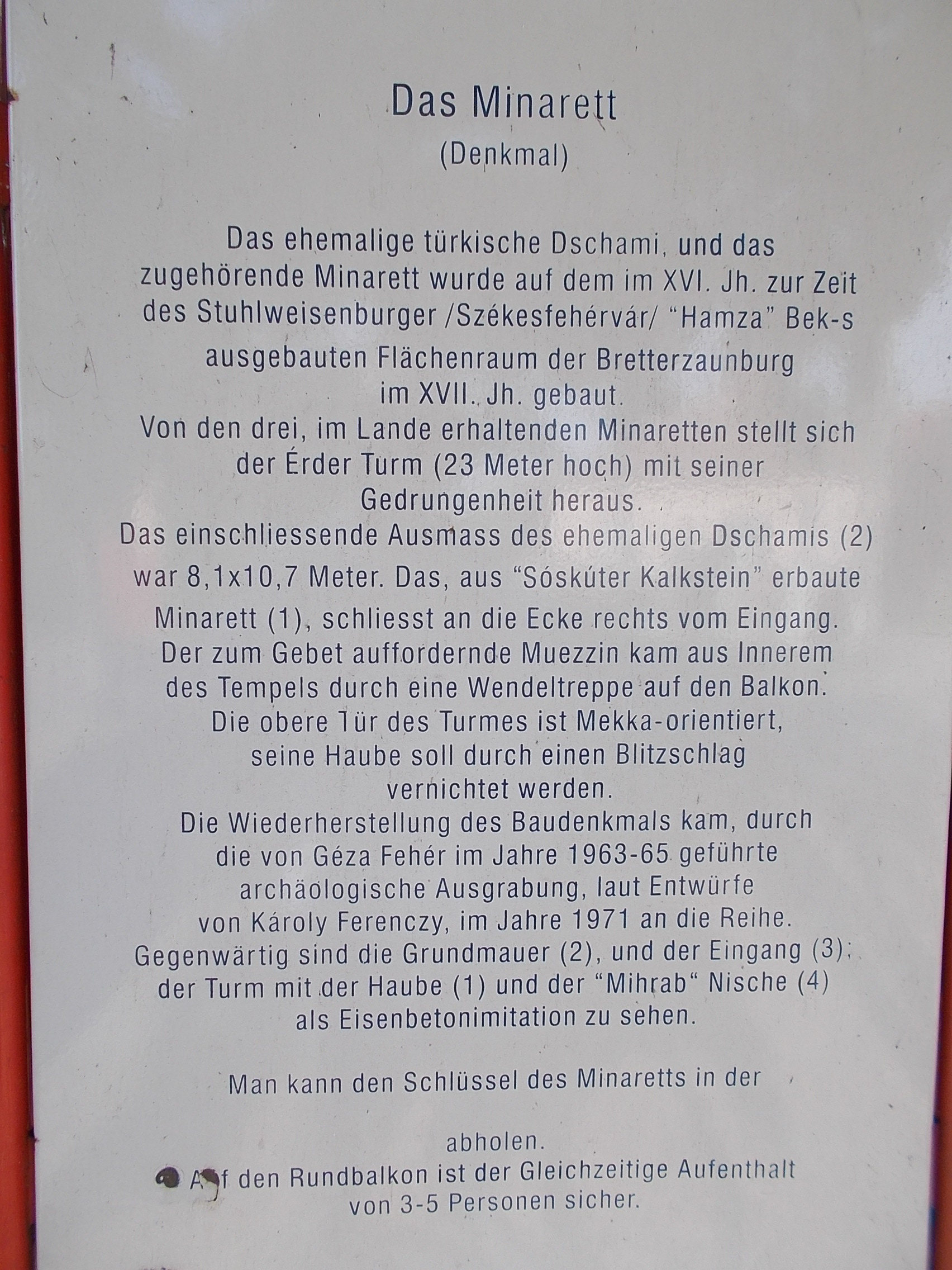
Description plaque in German on site.

== See also ==
- Eger
- Minaret
- Ottoman Hungary
- List of oldest minarets
