= Eger minaret =

Minaret in Eger, Hungary

- Egri minaret, Török-kori minaret, Kethüda minaret
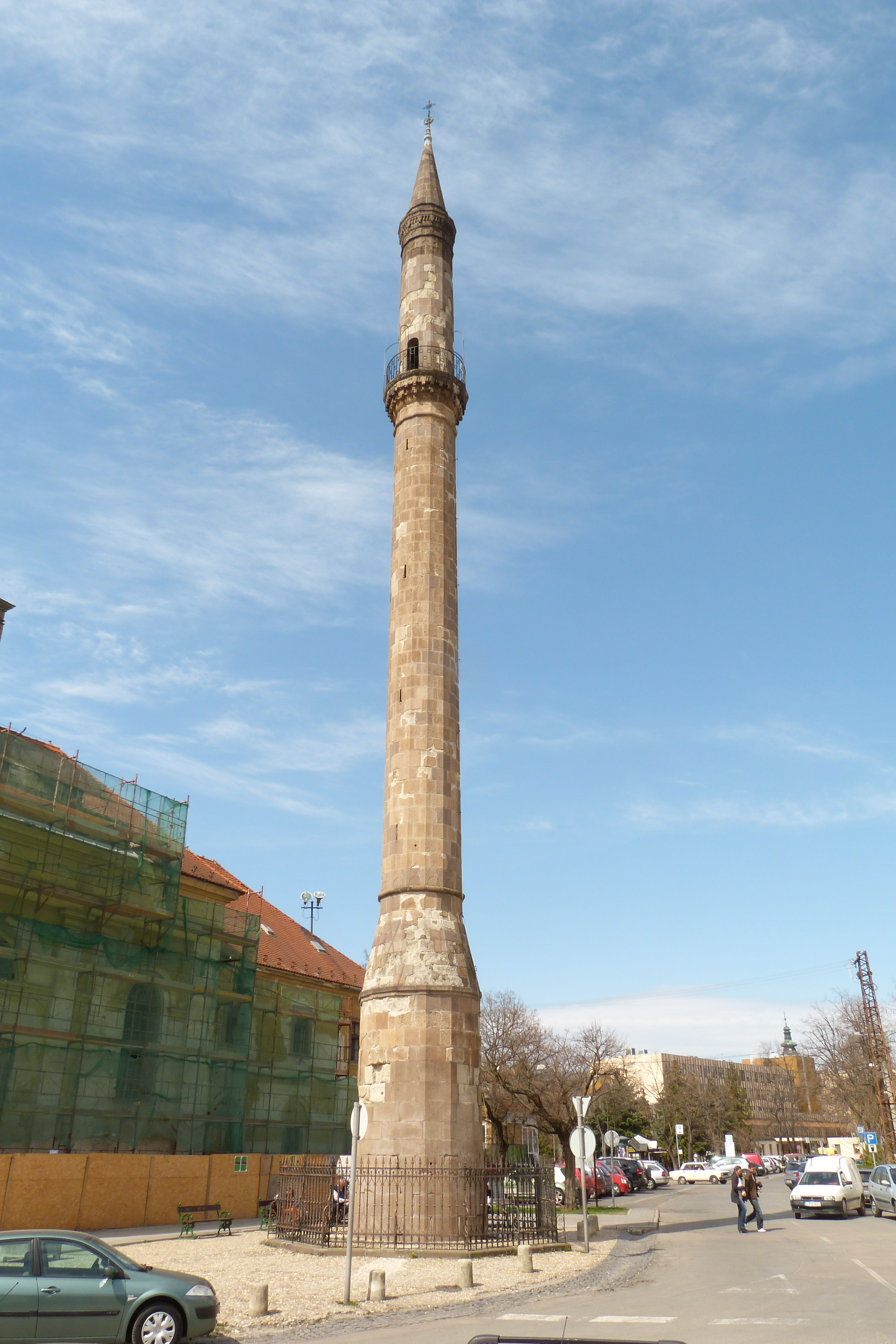
- Eger minaret in 2013.

- Location of Eger Minaret Eger (Europe)
- 47.89902°N 20.37470°E
- Type: Minaret, Monument
- Cultures: Islamic culture
- Location: Eger, Heves County, Hungary
- Region: Northern Hungary
- Part of: Djami of Kethuda mosque

History
- Built: Early 17th century
- Abandoned: Yes

Site notes
- Material: Red sandstone
- Height: 40 m (130 ft)
- Architectural style: Ottoman architecture
- Excavation dates: 2018
- Condition: Preserved
- Public access: Yes

The Eger minaret (Hungarian: Egri minaret or Kethüda-minaret) is an Ottoman-era minaret tower located in Eger city, northern Hungary. It is one of the most northern minarets left from Ottoman rule in Europe. The minaret is 40 metres (131 feet) high and built from red sandstone. It was built in the early 17th century as part of the Djami of Kethuda mosque and used for the Muslim call to prayer (Adhan). The mosque no longer exists, but the minaret survives as a preserved monument of Hungary and a major tourist attraction of Eger. There are 98 steps on the spiral staircase inside, which leads to a balcony at 26 meters from the ground, offering unique views of the surrounding city.

The Eger minaret is one of three surviving Ottoman-era minarets in Hungary. It is the highest and the best preserved of the three. The other two minarets are the Érd minaret and the minaret of Yakovalı Hasan Paşa Mosque in Pécs. In 2013, a Turkish Muslim resident of Eger was permitted to call the Muslim prayer from the minaret balcony, after centuries of silence.

== History ==
When exactly the minaret was constructed is still unknown and a number of theories exist about it. The Ottomans took control of Eger city in 1596. Eger minaret is believed to have been built at the beginning of Ottoman rule in the early 17th century.

=== Djami of Kethuda mosque ===
The Eger minaret was built as a minaret of the Djami of Kethuda mosque to call out the Islamic call to prayer five times a day for the faithful to come for congregational prayers. The mosque has been mentioned by Evliya Çelebi, who visited Eger in 1664 when it was under Ottoman rule.

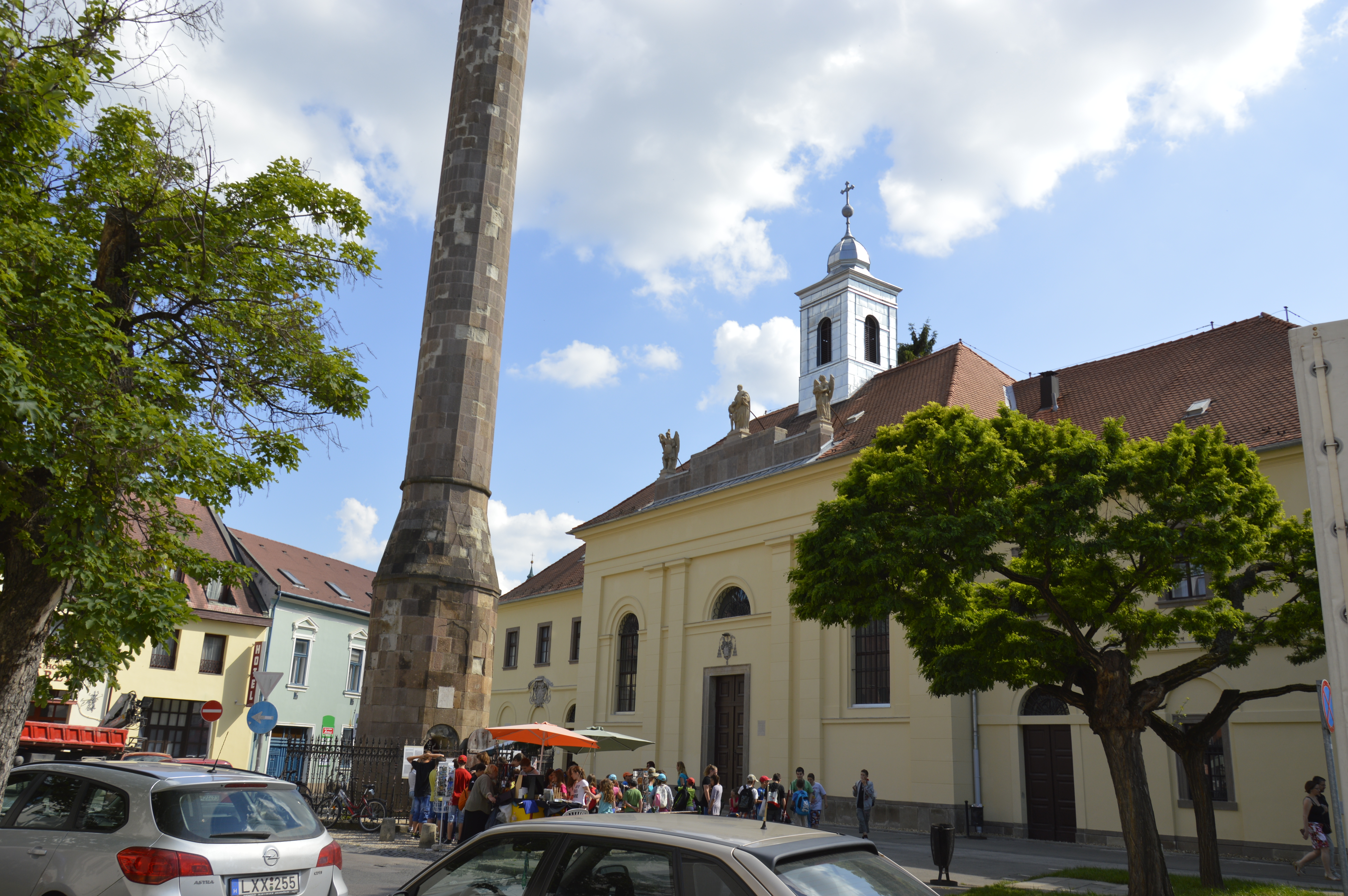
Former Djami of Kethuda mosque location behind minaret with 1841 church building.

The Ottomans were driven out of Eger in 1687 by an Austrian Imperial Army led by Charles of Lorraine. The mosque was converted into a Catholic church dedicated to St. Joseph after the Turkish rule. In 1726, the mosque premises was transformed into the Brothers of Mercy Hospital. The mosque served as the chapel of the hospital and the monastery. The mosque building was finally pulled down in 1841, and was replaced by the present St. Sebestyén's Martyrs' Church of Eger. The minaret was entered through the mosque and evidence on the minaret still indicate where it joined the mosque.

Not much details is known about the mosque during Ottoman time except for the brief note by Evliya Çelebi. However a more detailed description of the mosque can be constructed from later writings, after its conversion into a St. Joseph church. Gorove and later Ferenc Mészáros have left some descriptions of the former mosque building, when it was a church, along with the minaret. According to these, the mosque had a regular square plan except for a few minor architectural details. It was a meticulously assembled Turkish structure built in stone with carved windows and doors. It was made of the same reddish sandstone as the minaret and covered by a vaulted roof or dome according to Gorove. The main facade of the mosque had a courtyard surrounded by polished stone. The minaret formed an integral part of the mosque according to Ferenc Mészáros description.

=== Demolition attempt ===
After Ottoman rule ended, an attempt was made to tear down the tower as a symbolic closure of the past. After human force failed, an attempt was made pull it down using 400 oxen with ropes fixed to the structure. When the tower proved too resilient to demolition efforts it was allowed to remain with a cross placed atop the surmounting crescent. The Eger minaret is the only minaret remaining of an estimated 17 that were built in Eger during the 91-year Ottoman rule of the city. A 17th-century illustration of the city shows the abundance of minarets.

=== Preservation ===
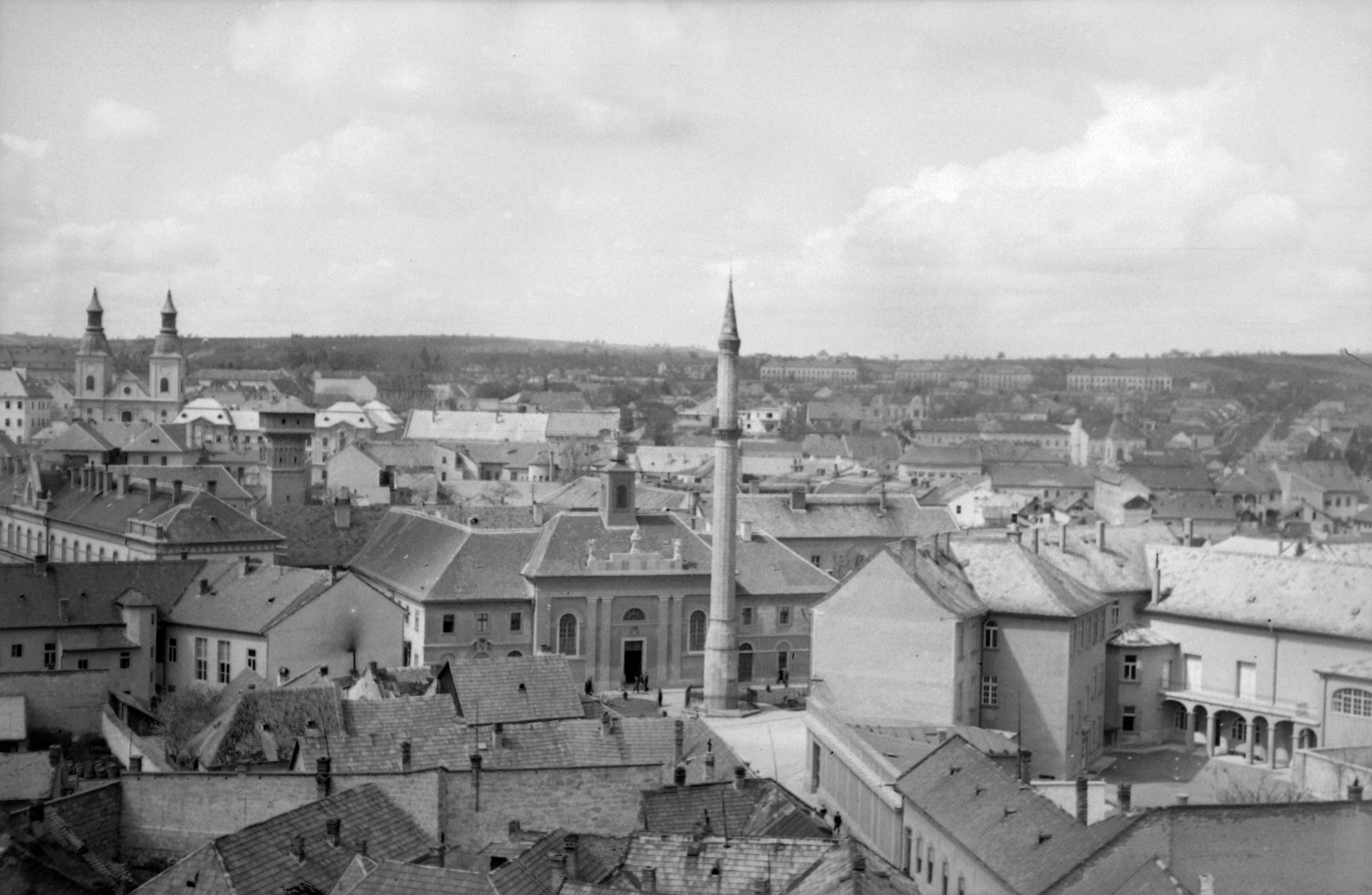
Eger skyline with the minaret in 1935

In the early 19th century the minarets roof, called the original dome, had collapsed as a result of a lightning strike. It deteriorated the condition of the tower. In 1829, a tin roof was placed on the tower by Archbishop Pyrker János László, safeguarding it from complete destruction. In 1897, restoration work was carried out on the minaret by the National Committee of the Monuments according to plans of István Möller. The National Monumentary Inspectorate again carried out some minor conservation work in 1962.

In the past, the minaret was seen as a symbol of occupation. Today, it is a celebrated monument of the good relations between Hungary and Turkey.

In 2013, a Turkish national named Demir Hikmet was permitted to become the muezzin (reciter of the call to prayer) of the minaret and perform the Adhan (Muslim call to prayer), after centuries of silence. Hungarian media in November 2014 described the return of the call as coming "after 327 years". Demir Hikmet climbed the tower three times a week in a silk caftan and recited the call to prayer from the tower balcony.

The minaret was renovated again in 2018 due to deterioration in recent years which had greatly reduced its load-bearing capacity and placed the monument in danger. It was closed for visitors during the renovation and opened again in Summer 2018. During the renovation, experts had found ceramic dishes dating back to the Turkish era.

== Architecture ==
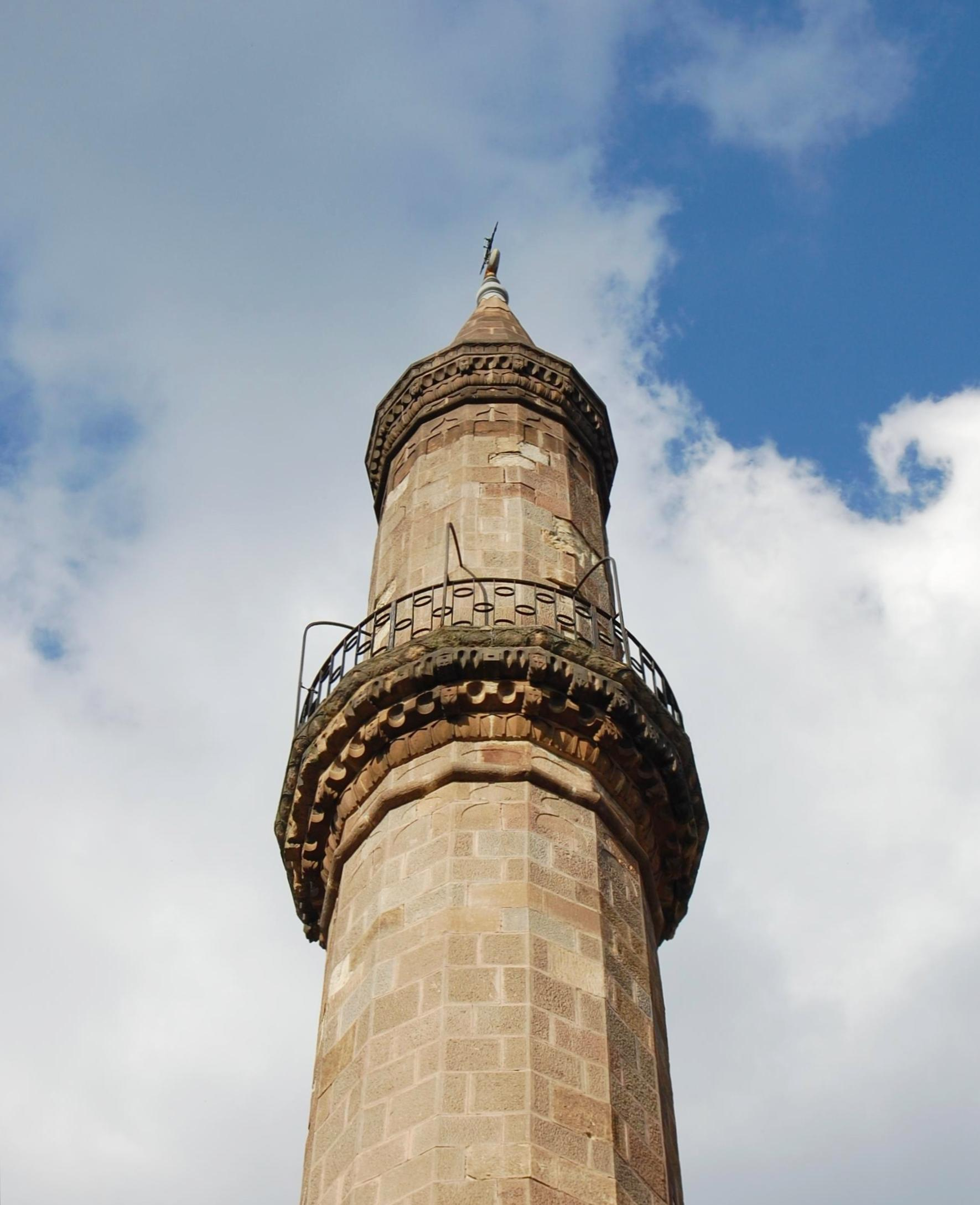
Overlapping ornamental rings round the balcony and roof.

Eger minaret is a 14 sided planed structure which is unusual and makes it very strong. It is built using carved reddish sandstone to a height of 40 metres (131 feet). There is a narrow spiral staircase in the interior with 98 steps leading to the minaret balcony. The minaret balcony circling the tower is situated 26 meters up from the ground.

On the tower plinth a row of mirror fields with a repeating double-edged dwarf pattern run around. The entrance to the minaret is on the north side of the pedestal. It was originally not out in the open but the entrance was from within the mosque. The entrance to the tower has a semicircular closure. The space inside is small with a steep narrow stone staircase leading to the balcony. The balcony has a door with a semicircular closure, similar to the entrance. The balcony entrance faces the direction of Mecca.

There minaret balcony bottom is also ornamented with a recessed overlapping circular belt of rings. It is again repeated around the tower roof with recessed overlapping rings of ornaments.

== Tourism ==
The Eger minaret is a popular attraction for tourists in Eger. Tourist are allowed to climb the 98 steps to the Minaret balcony and view the panorama of surrounding city and Eger Castle. Those who suffer from claustrophobia and fear of heights are advised to be cautious in climbing the narrow staircase to the tower balcony.

== Gallery ==
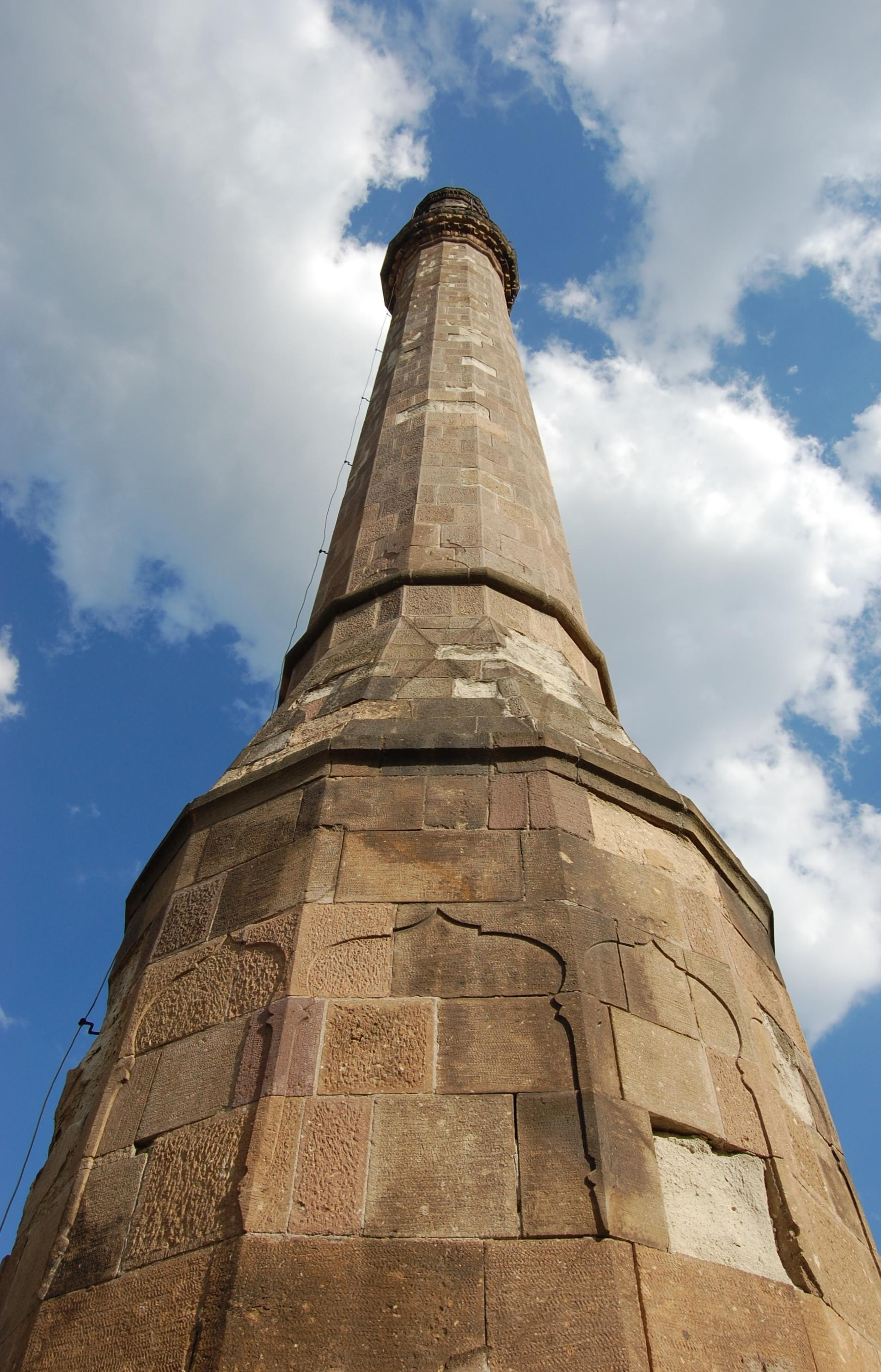
Islamic stone artwork depressions on the tower base.

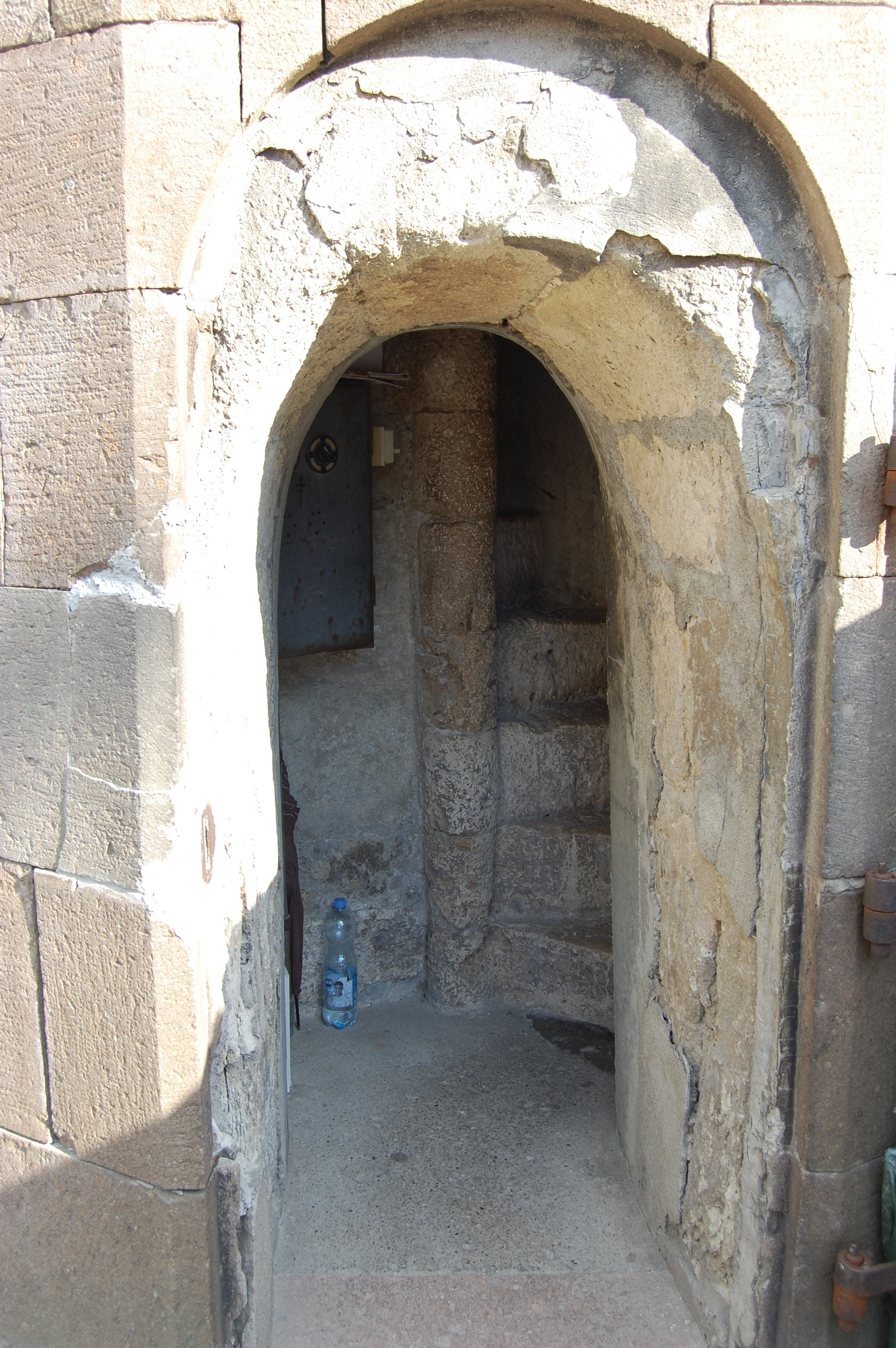
Tower staircase entrance in 2011.

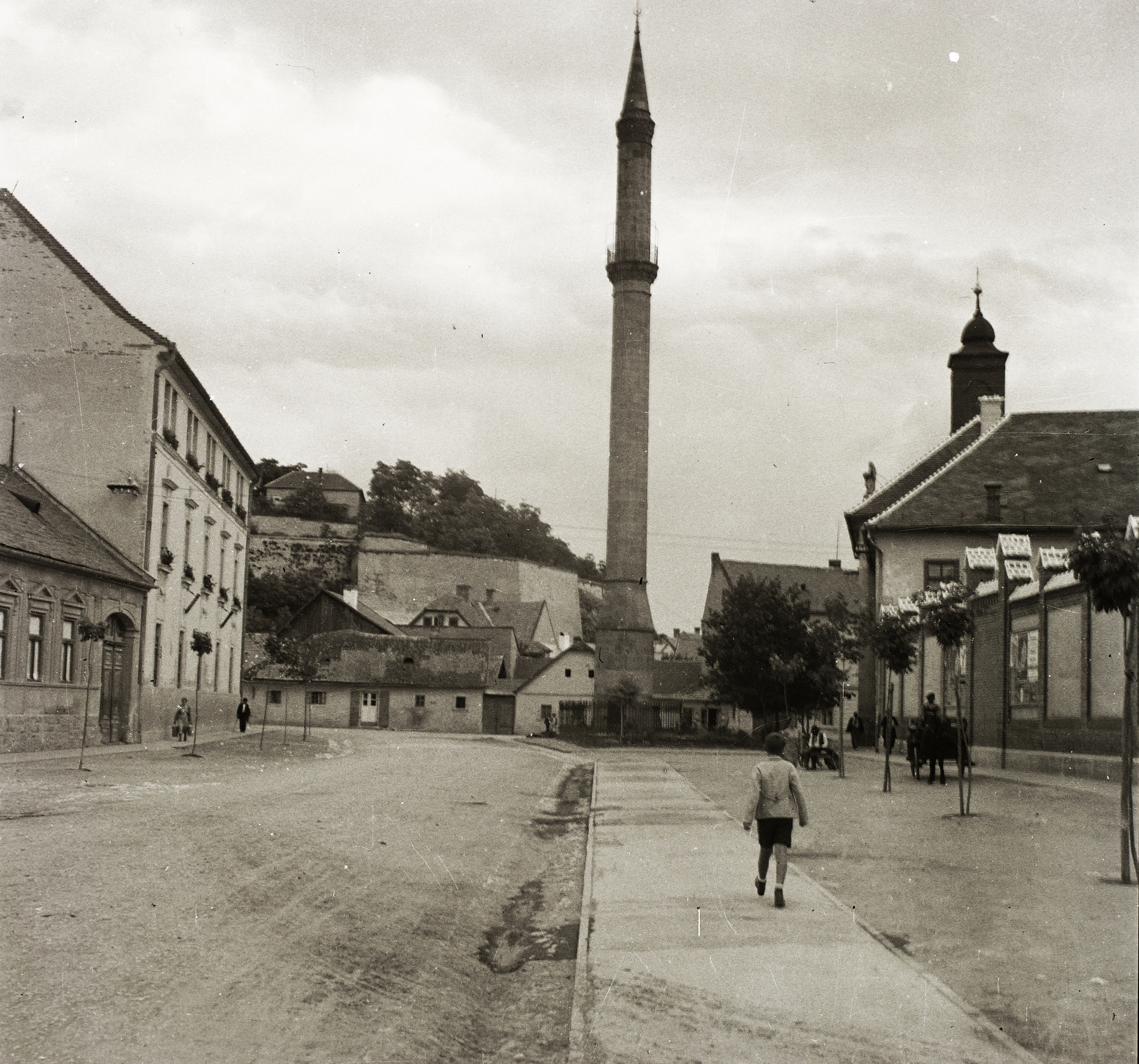
Eger minaret in 1935.

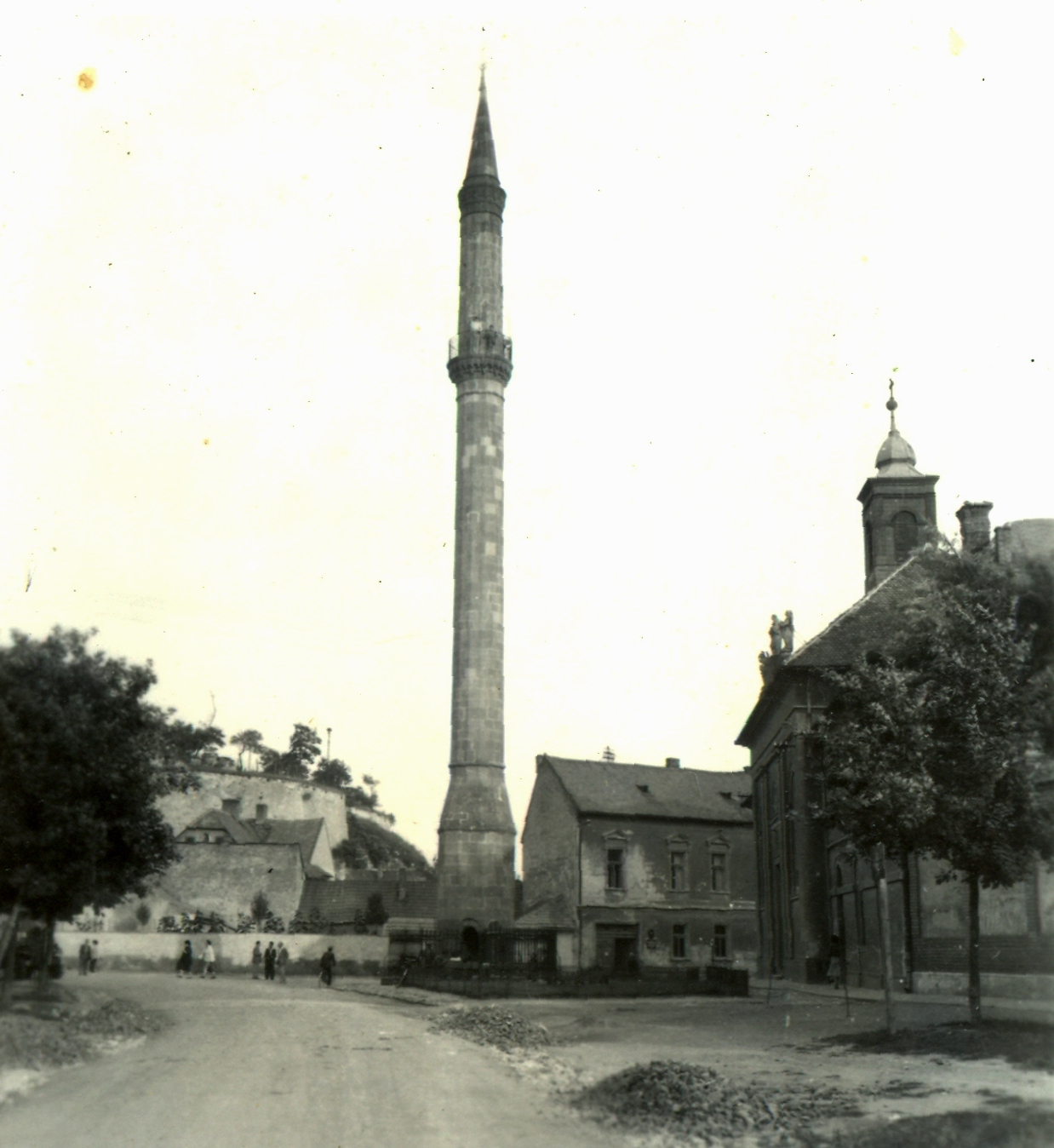
Minaret of Eger in 1952.

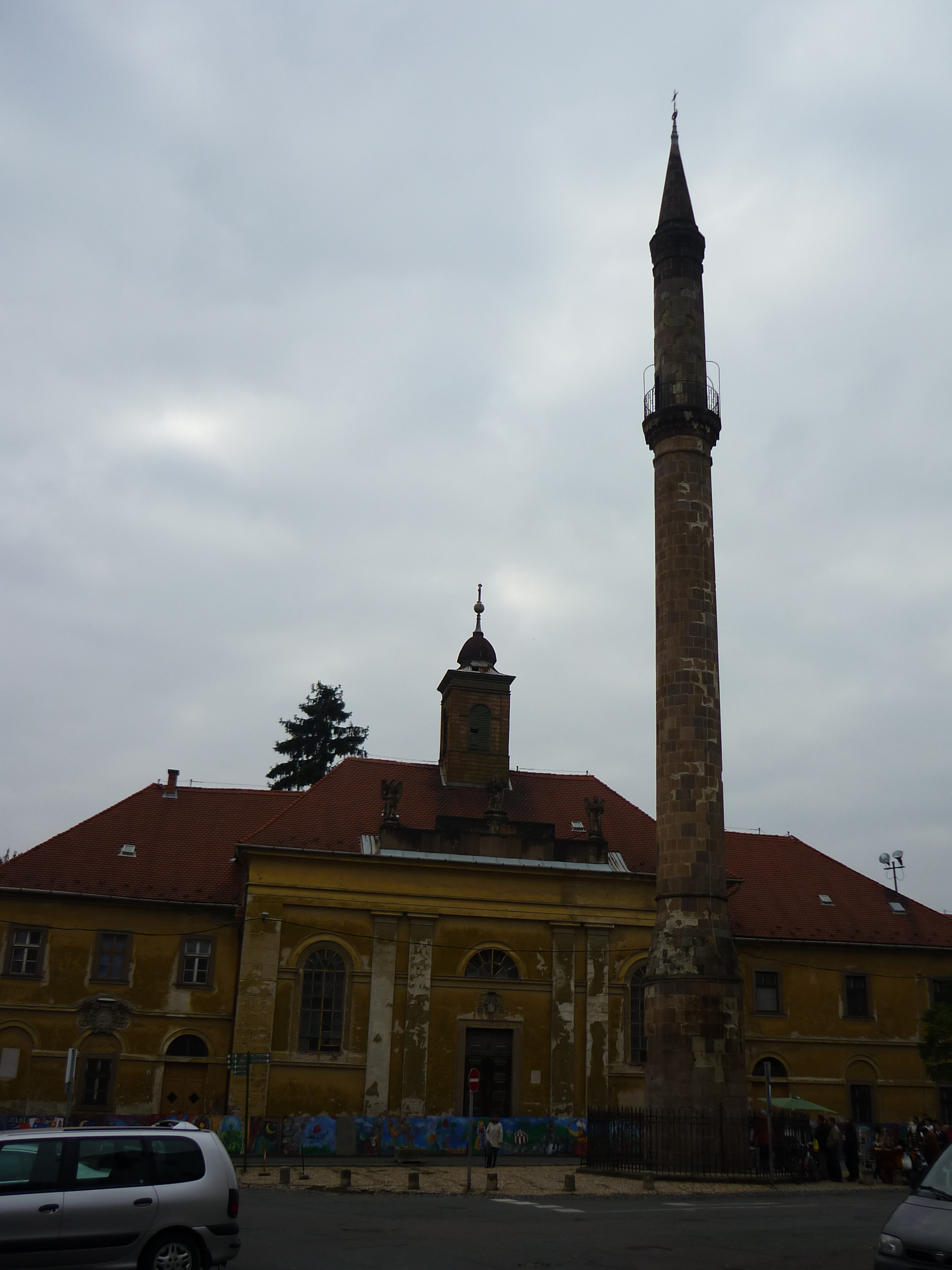
2009 photo.

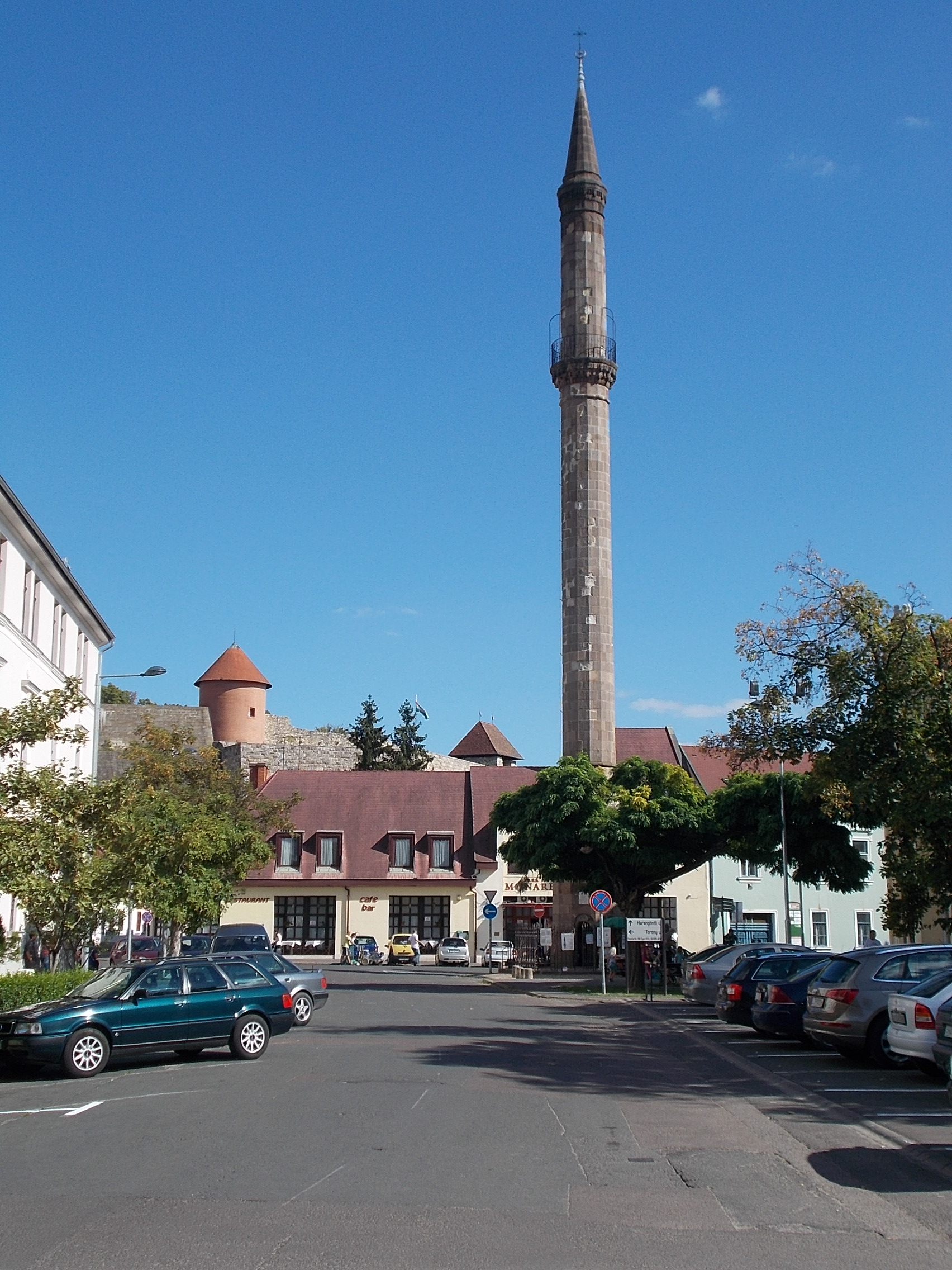
2016 photo.

== See also ==
- Eger
- Minaret
- Ottoman Hungary
- List of oldest minarets
