= Yakovalı Hasan Paşa Mosque =

Mosque in Pécs, Baranya, Hungary

- Hungarian: Jakováli Hasszán dzsámija
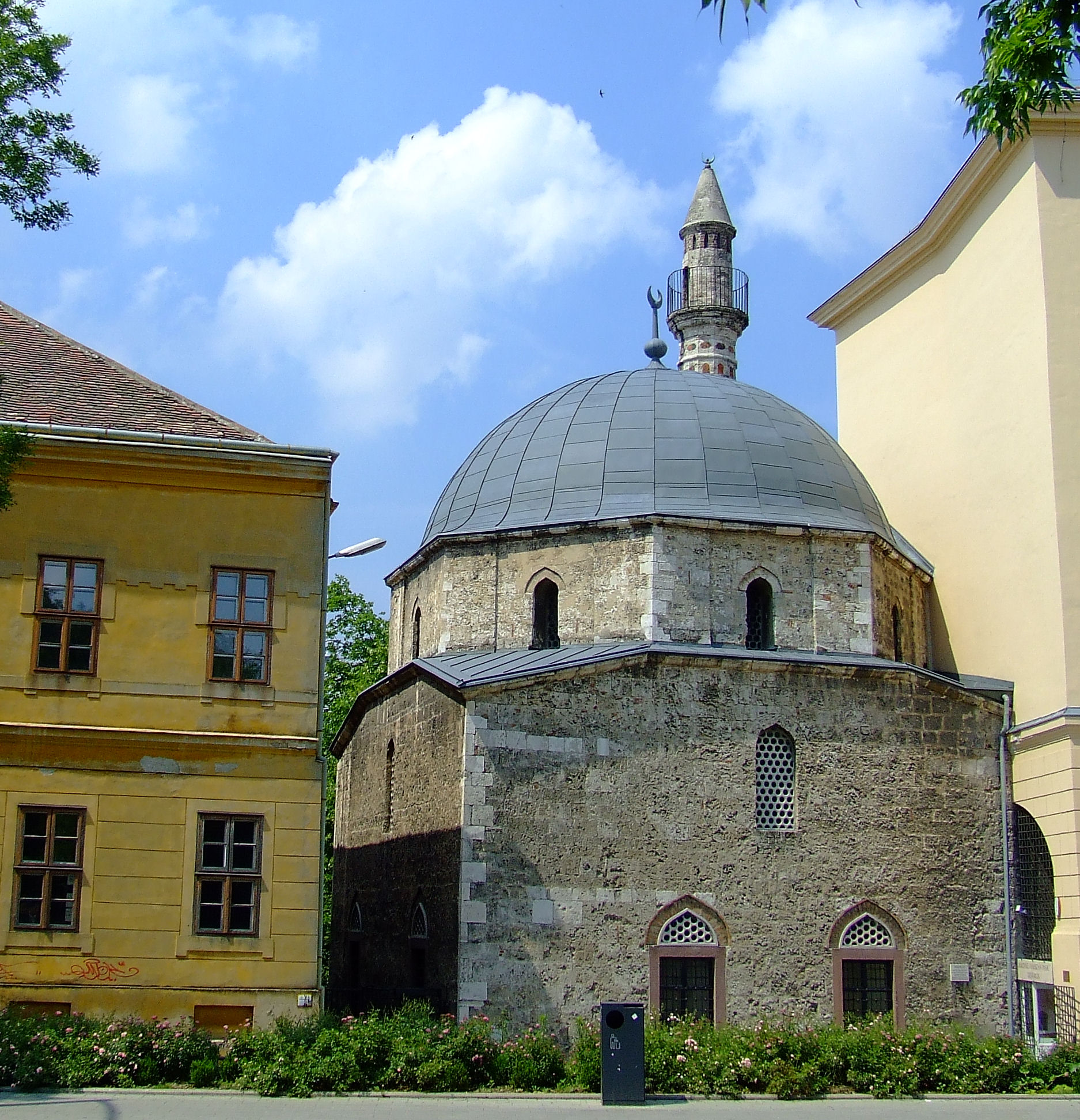
- The mosque, in 2011

- Location of the mosque in Hungary

Religion
- Affiliation: Islam
- Branch/tradition: Sunni
- Ecclesiastical or organizational status: Mosque
- Status: Active

Location
- Location: Pécs, Baranya County
- Country: Hungary
- Interactive map of Yakovalı Hasan Paşa Mosque
- Coordinates: 46.07125°N 18.23311°E

Architecture
- Type: Mosque architecture
- Style: Ottoman
- Completed: c. early 17th century (exact date unknown)

The Yakovalı Hasan Paşa Mosque (Hungarian: Jakováli Hasszán dzsámija, Turkish: Yakovalı Hasan Paşa Camii) is an early 17th-century mosque in Pécs, southern Hungary. It was constructed when the region was part of the Turkish Ottoman Empire, together with the main mosque of Pécs, the Mosque of Pasha Qasim (which has since been consecrated as a cathedral). It was named after the local government official who commissioned the mosque, Yakovalı Hasan Paşa, or Hasan Pasha of Yakova. It is thus one of the oldest mosques existing in Hungary today, and is considered to be the most intact Hungarian mosque to have survived from the Ottoman era. The mosque is still active as a Muslim place of worship, and also houses a small exhibition centre for Turkish handicraft and historical artifacts documenting Hungary's Ottoman past.

== History ==
The mosque was built several decades after the Ottoman conquest of central Hungary. Its architect and exact date of construction are unknown. Several sources speculate that it was built in the late 16th century, but it is more likely that it was constructed in the 1630s. The mosque was named after its benefactor who established a vakuf (endowment) for the mosque's construction, Yakovalı Hasan Paşa, or Hasan Pasha of Yakova. The "Yakova" in his epithet either refers to the town of Gjakova in Kosovo or Đakovo in present-day Croatia. Yakovalı Hasan participated in the successful 1660 siege of Oradea (Nagyvárad), and defended Pécs and Kanizsa against the troops of Miklós Zrínyi in 1664. He also took part in the border demarcations following the 1664 Peace of Vasvár.

The mosque was in use for about half a century before being presumably abandoned from late 1686 when Pécs was captured by Austrian forces, after which it served as a hospital. Between 1702 and 1732, it was converted into a Catholic chapel by the Bishop of Pécs, Wilhelm Franz von Nesselrode. During this time, the minaret was turned into a bell tower, with the ruined spire being replaced with a belfry. Its interior was decorated with Baroque carvings which were then in fashion.

The mosque was first restored in the 1960s, when the minaret was repaired and the Baroque ornamentation removed to restore the mosque to its original condition. A second restoration was conducted in the 2000s, in time for Pécs's designation as the European Capital for Culture in 2010 (along with Istanbul and Essen).

The mosque is open to the public on designated days except Mondays and Friday services from 2.30 to 3.30 pm. Its upkeep is funded by private donations as well as grants from the Turkish state. A permanent exhibition opened in 2022, with Turkey providing interior furnishings from the 16th century.

== Architecture ==
Yakovalı Hasan Paşa Mosque has a relatively simple structure, with a square base surmounted by a typical Turkish dome and ogee windows. As with all mosques, it is orientated towards Mecca and thus has a northwest–southeast axis. The minaret is 22.5 m high. A flight of stairs leads to the top of the minaret, but due to stability concerns the entrance is sealed off to visitors. The balcony was once adorned with a stone railing. On religious holidays the minaret used to be lit up with oil lamps (see also mahya lights). It is one of only three Ottoman-era minarets remaining in Hungary, and the only one still attached to a mosque and retaining its original function.

There was once a foyer on the northwest side of the mosque, part of a larger complex which included a tekke (a sort of monastery for sufi dervishes), an imaret (soup kitchen for the needy), and a madrassa (Islamic school).

A statue of the Ottoman chronicler İbrahim Peçevi (Ibrahim of Pécs), by Turkish sculptor Metin Yurdanur, was unveiled before the mosque in 2016.

== Gallery ==
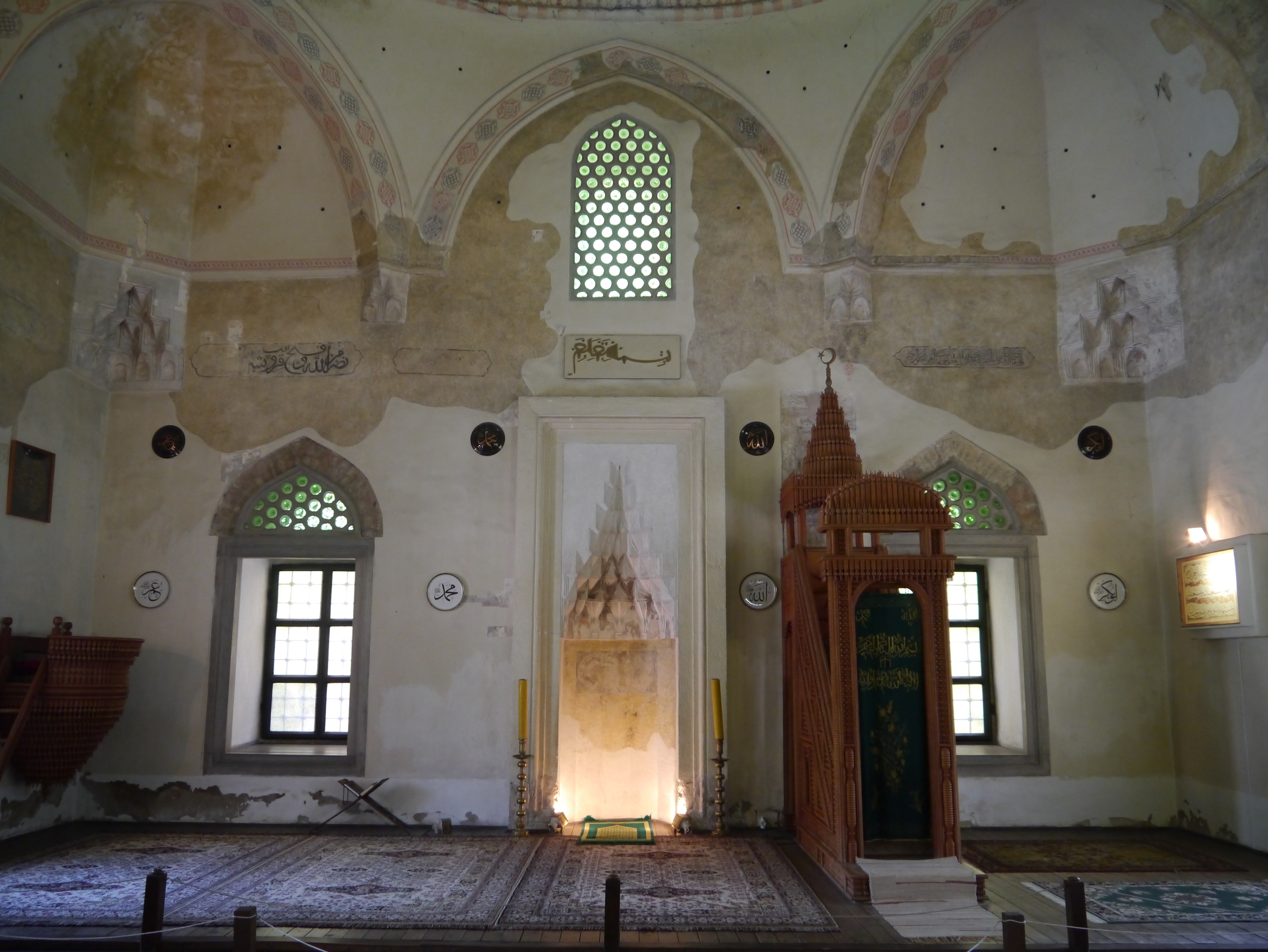
Main prayer hall. The mihrab, where the imam leads congregational prayers, is in the centre

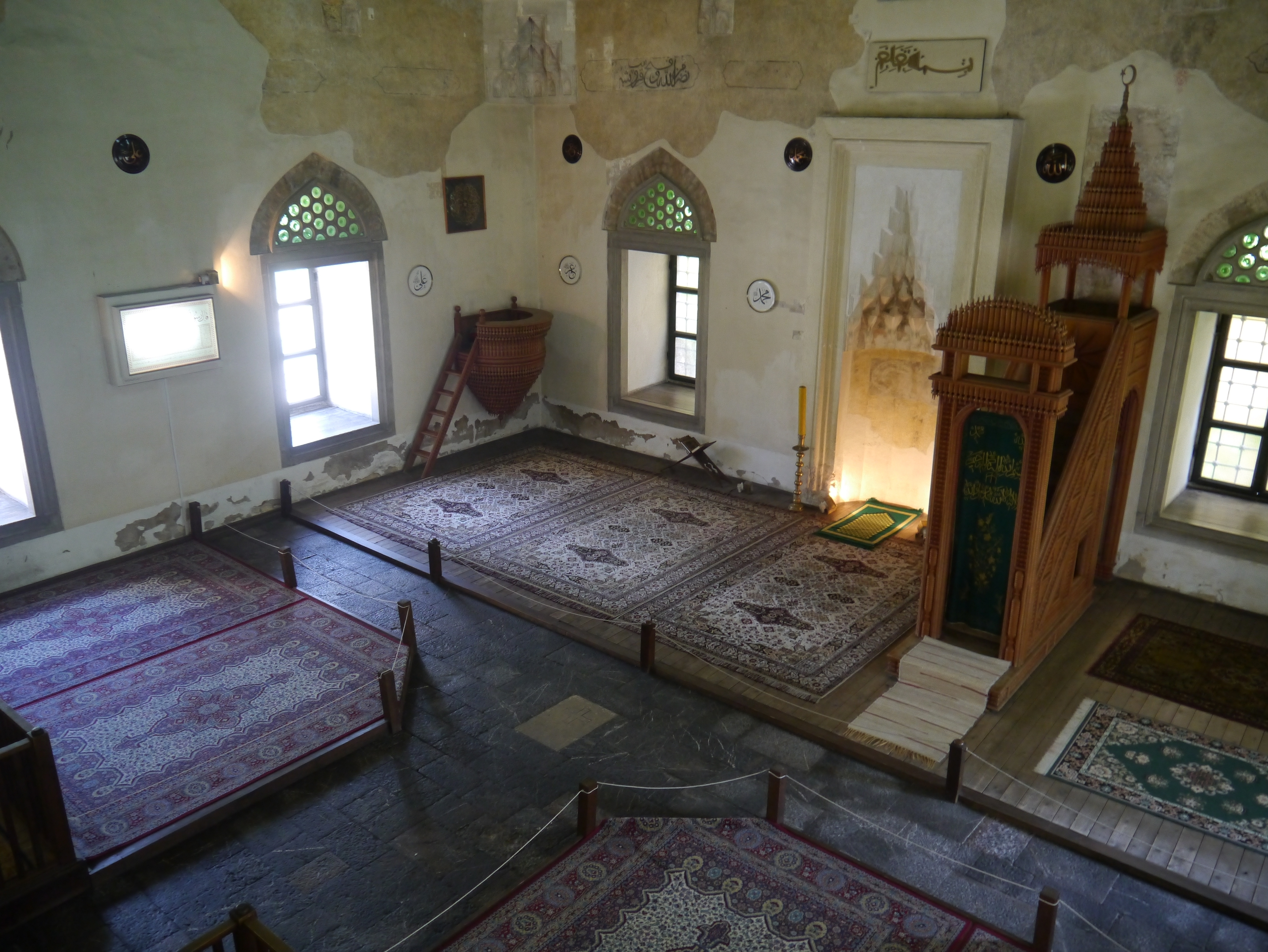
Another view of the prayer hall, with prayer rugs. The small wooden structure near the corner is a kürsü or loge for delivering lectures other than Friday sermons at the minbar, and is typical of Turkish mosques

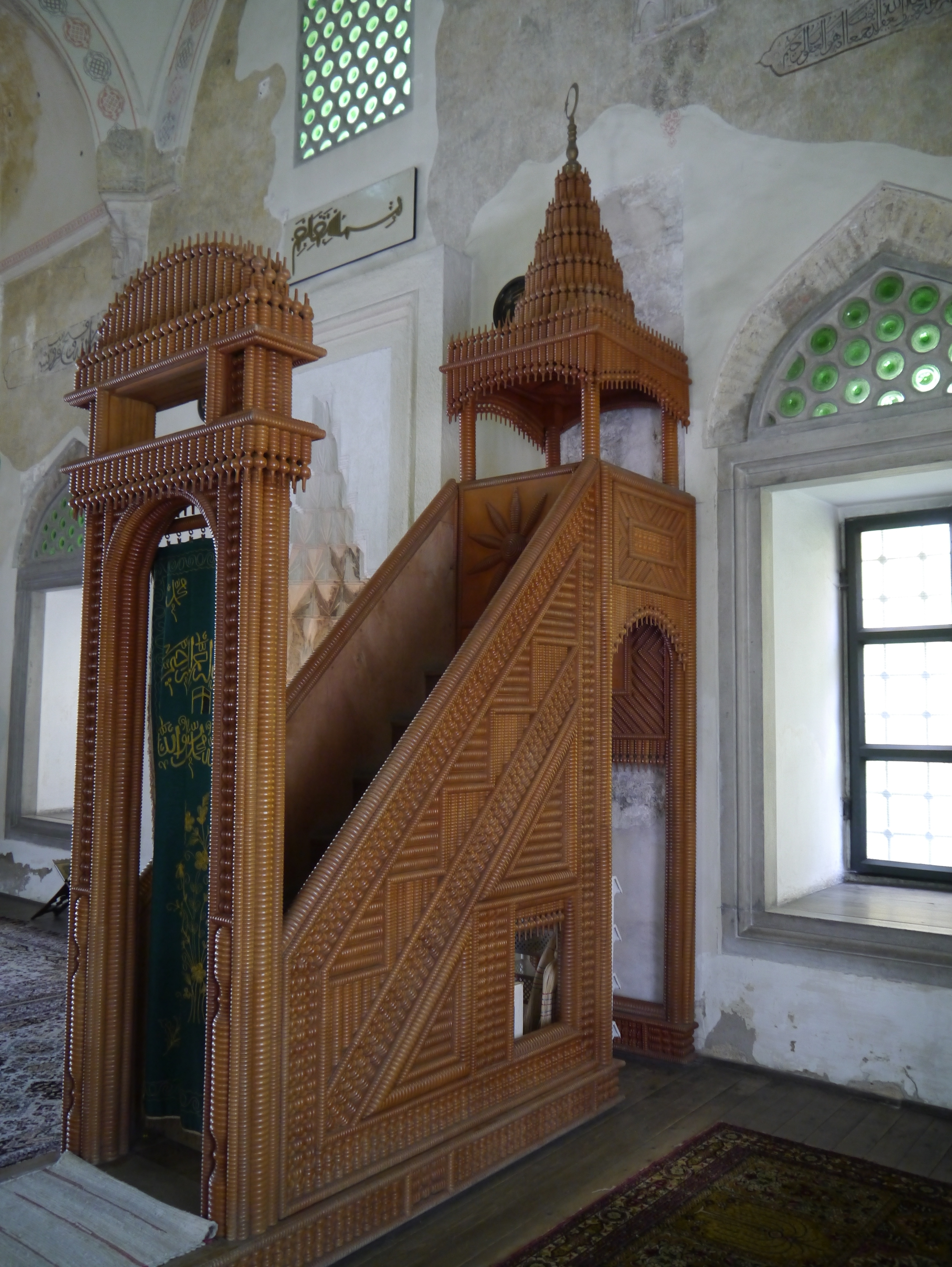
The minbar or pulpit. Both the minbar and the kürsü are made from rosewood.

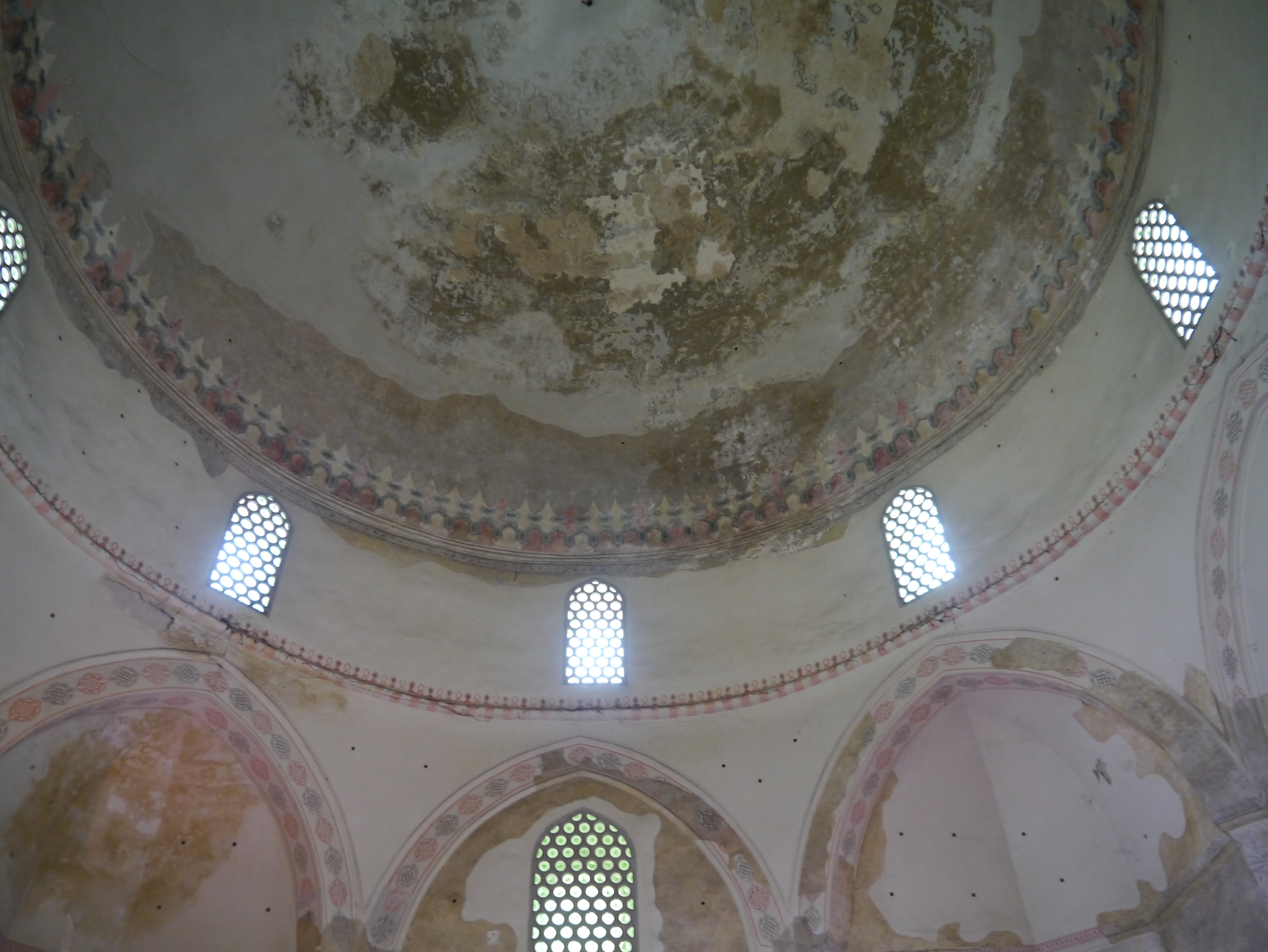
Interior of the dome

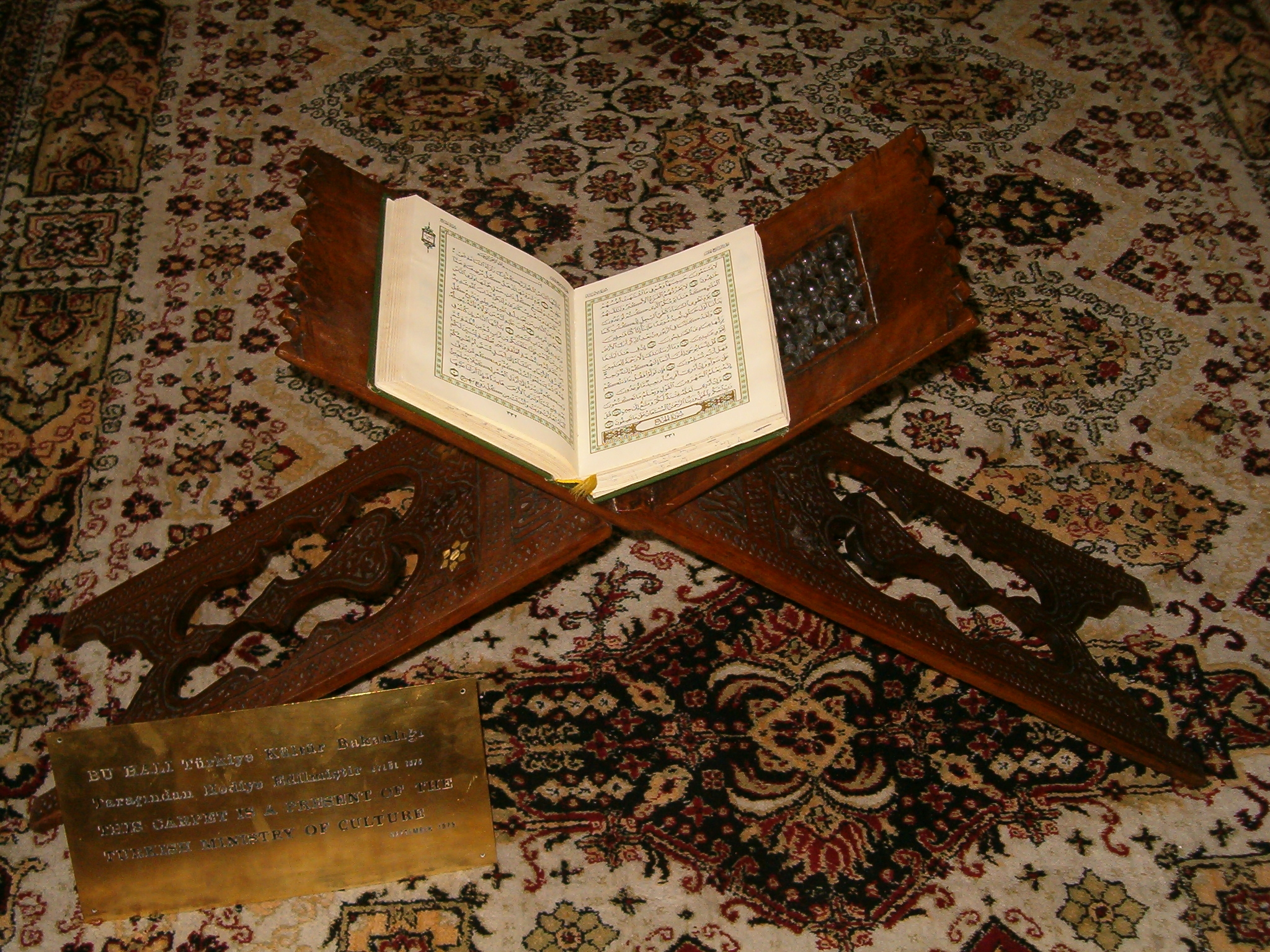
Koran on the stand with a sign reads “This carpet is a present of the Turkish Ministry of Culture”

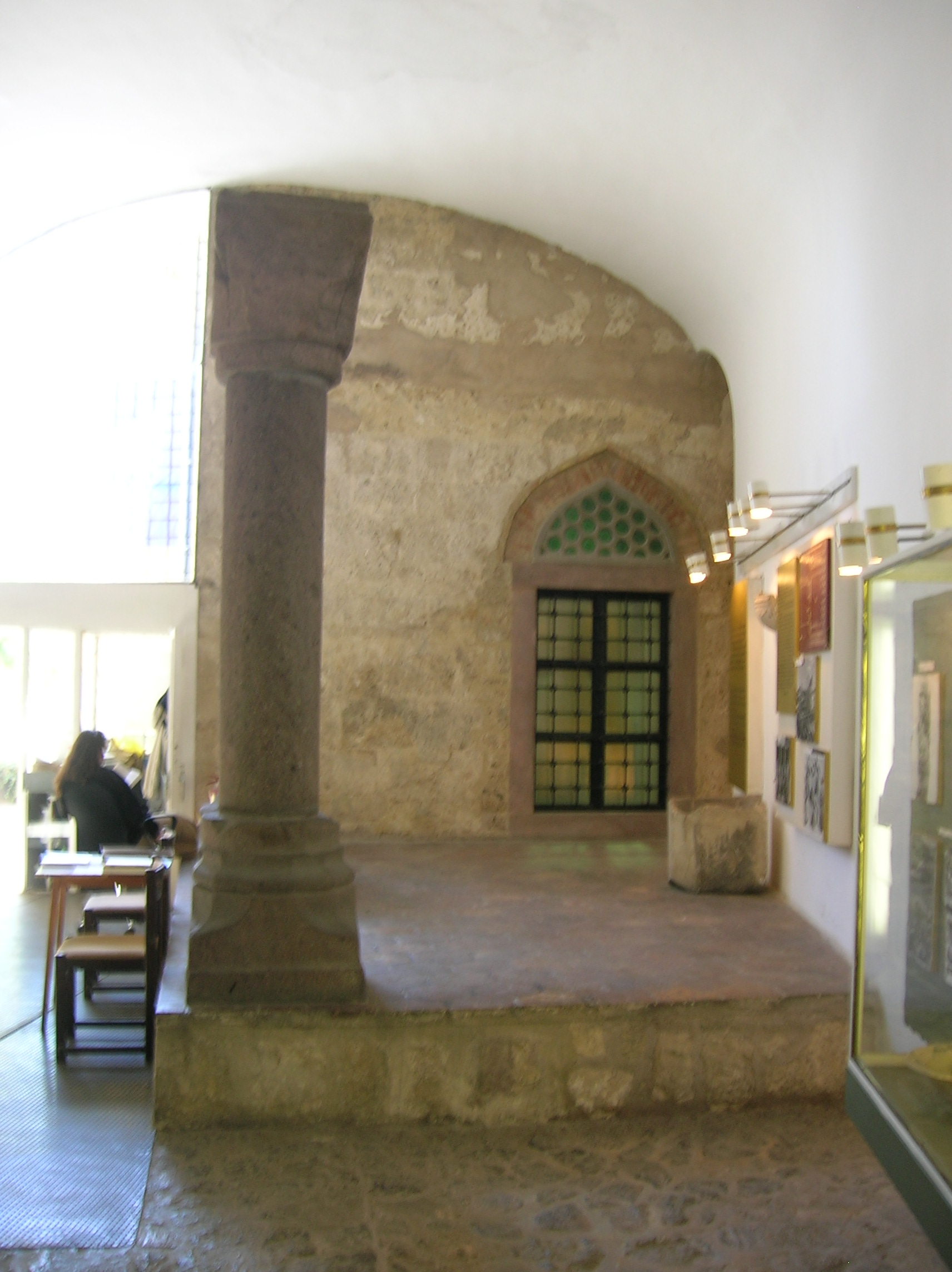
Exhibition corner

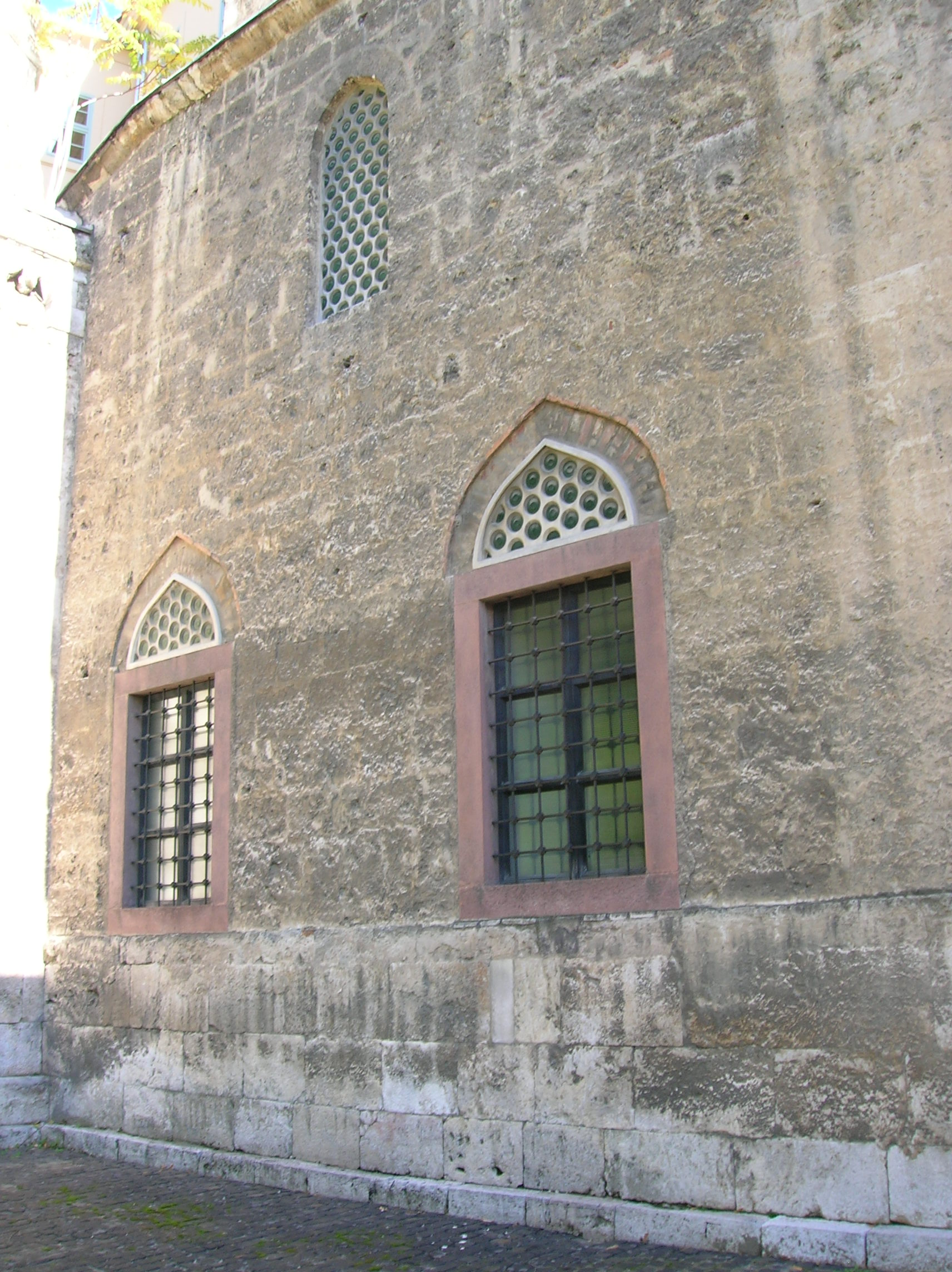
Wall of the mosque with windows
