= Chicago Film Critics Association Awards 2018 =

Annual US film awards ceremony

31st Chicago Film Critics Association
- Date: December 8, 2018
- Site: Chicago, Illinois, U.S.

Highlights
- Best Film: Roma
- Most awards: Roma (5)
- Most nominations: Roma (9)

The 31st Chicago Film Critics Association Awards were announced on December 8, 2018. The awards honor the best in film for 2018. The nominations were announced on December 7. Roma received the most nominations (9), followed by The Favourite (7) and A Star Is Born (7).

== Winners and nominees ==
The winners and nominees for the 31st Chicago Film Critics Association Awards are as follows:

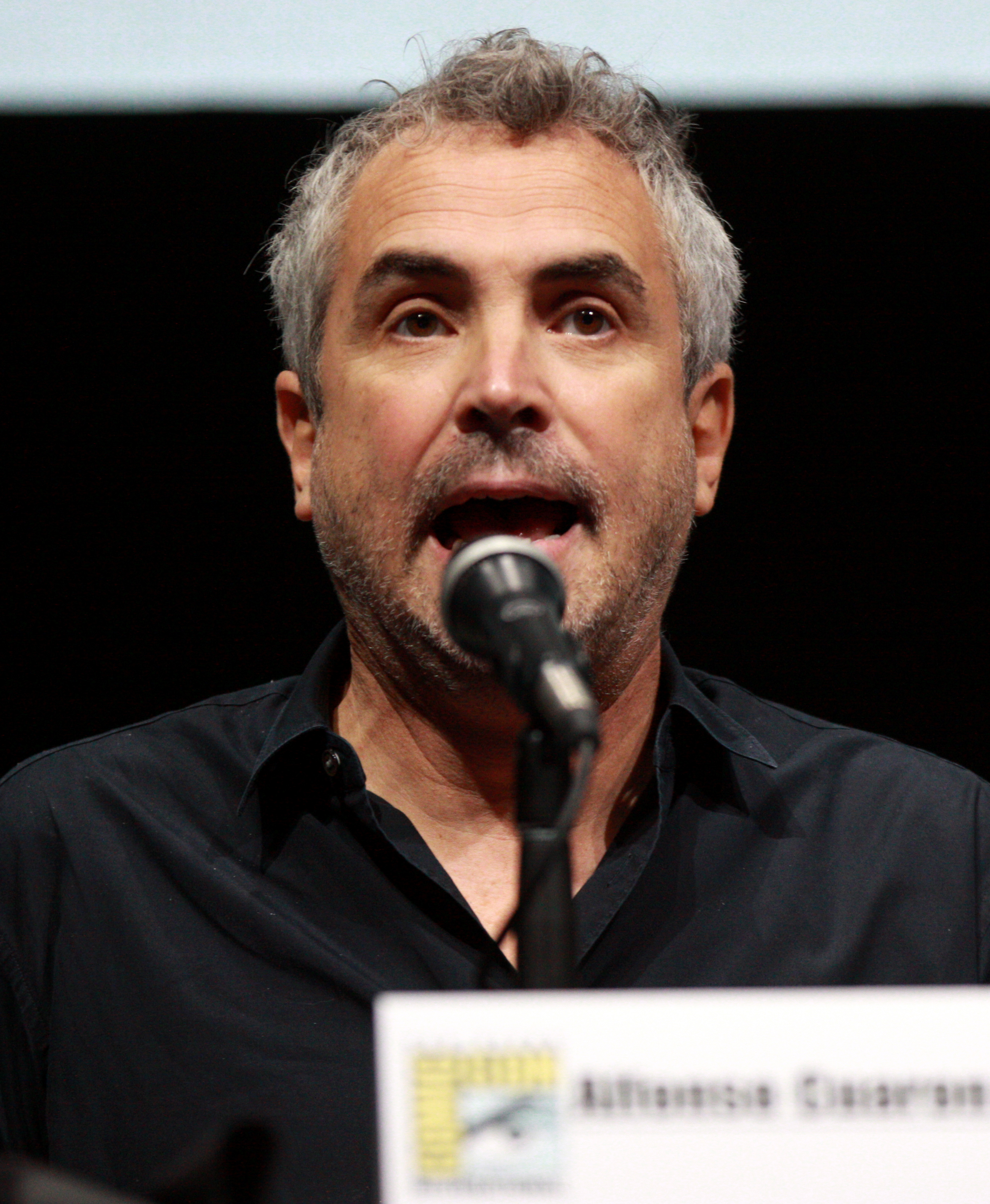
Alfonso Cuarón, Best Director winner

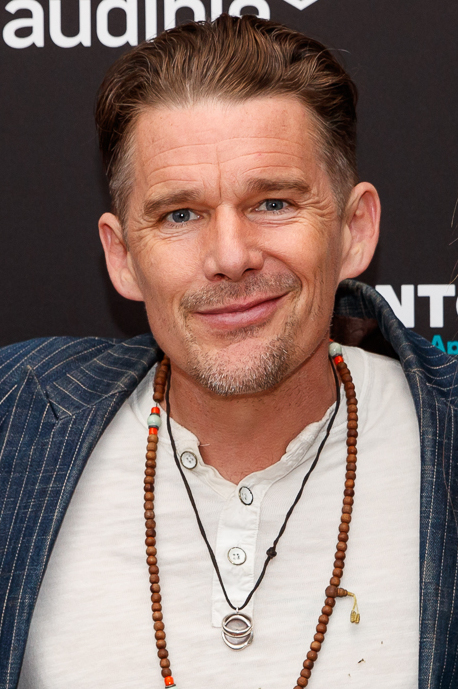
Ethan Hawke, Best Actor winner

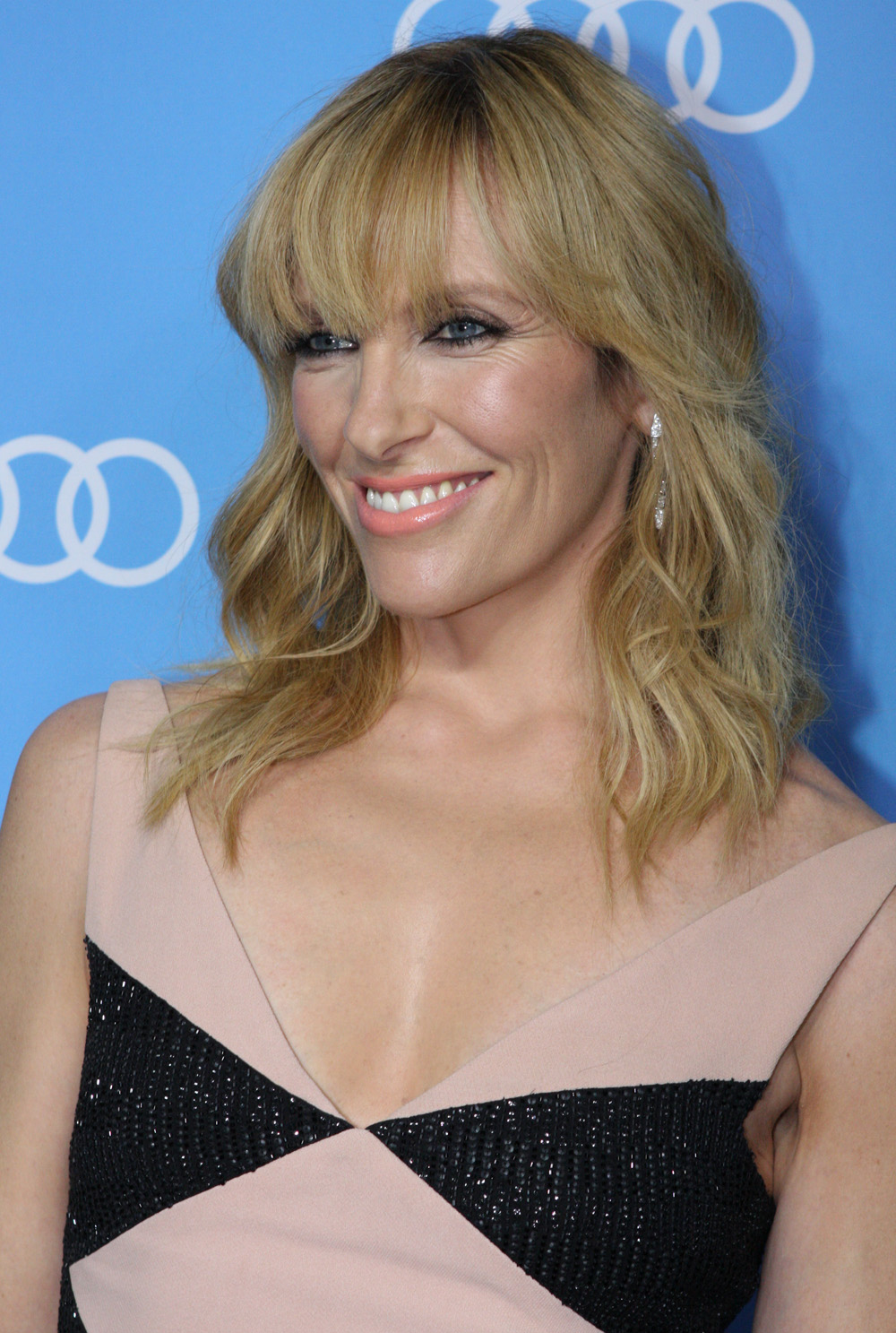
Toni Collette, Best Actress winner

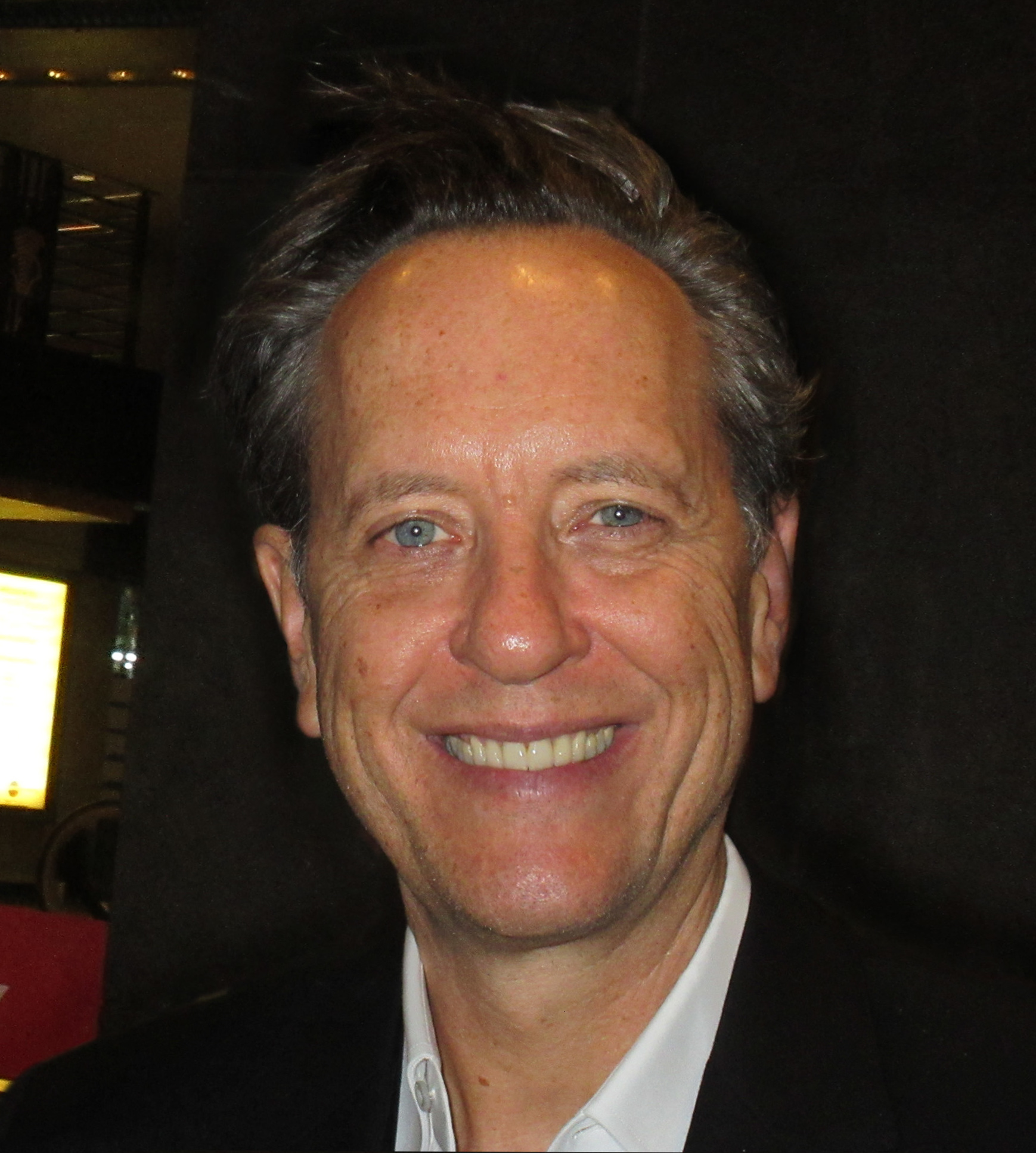
Richard E. Grant, Best Supporting Actor winner

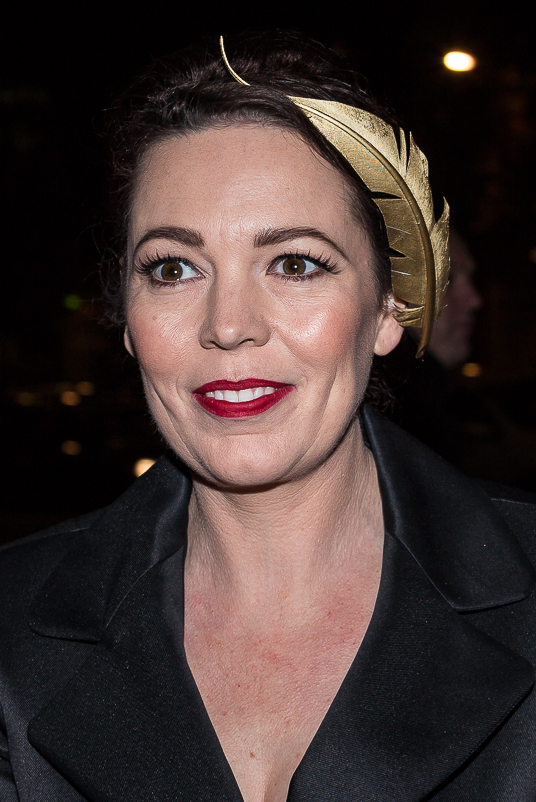
Olivia Colman, Best Supporting Actress winner

=== Awards ===
Best Film	Best Director
Roma – Alfonso Cuarón, Gabriela Rodríguez, and Nicolas Celis: The Favourite – Ceci Dempsey, Ed Guiney, Lee Magiday, and Yorgos Lanthimos; First Reformed – Jack Binder, Greg Clark, Victoria Hill, Gary Hamilton, Deepak Sikka, Christine Vachon, David Hinojosa, and Frank Murray; Hereditary – Kevin Frakes, Lars Knudsen, and Buddy Patrick; A Star Is Born – Bill Gerber, Jon Peters, Bradley Cooper, Todd Phillips, and Lynette Howell Taylor	Alfonso Cuarón – Roma: Bradley Cooper – A Star Is Born; Yorgos Lanthimos – The Favourite; Lynne Ramsay – You Were Never Really Here; Paul Schrader – First Reformed
Best Actor	Best Actress
Ethan Hawke – First Reformed as Reverend Ernst Toller: Christian Bale – Vice as Dick Cheney; Bradley Cooper – A Star Is Born as Jackson Maine; Rami Malek – Bohemian Rhapsody as Freddie Mercury; Joaquin Phoenix – You Were Never Really Here as Joe	Toni Collette – Hereditary as Annie Graham: Yalitza Aparicio – Roma as Cleo; Lady Gaga – A Star Is Born as Ally Maine; Regina Hall – Support the Girls as Lisa Conroy; Melissa McCarthy – Can You Ever Forgive Me? as Lee Israel
Best Supporting Actor	Best Supporting Actress
Richard E. Grant – Can You Ever Forgive Me? as Jack Hock: Mahershala Ali – Green Book as Don Shirley; Timothée Chalamet – Beautiful Boy as Nic Sheff; Michael B. Jordan – Black Panther as N'Jadaka / Erik "Killmonger" Stevens; Steven Yeun – Burning as Ben	Olivia Colman – The Favourite as Anne, Queen of Great Britain: Elizabeth Debicki – Widows as Alice Gunner; Zoe Kazan – The Ballad of Buster Scruggs as Alice Longabaugh; Regina King – If Beale Street Could Talk as Sharon Rivers; Rachel Weisz – The Favourite as Sarah Churchill, Duchess of Marlborough
Best Original Screenplay	Best Adapted Screenplay
First Reformed – Paul Schrader: Eighth Grade – Bo Burnham; The Favourite – Deborah Davis and Tony McNamara; Roma – Alfonso Cuarón; Vice – Adam McKay	If Beale Street Could Talk – Barry Jenkins based on the novel by James Baldwin: BlacKkKlansman – Charlie Wachtel, David Rabinowitz, Kevin Willmott, and Spike Lee based on the memoir by Ron Stallworth; Can You Ever Forgive Me? – Nicole Holofcener and Jeff Whitty based on the memoir by Lee Israel; The Death of Stalin – Armando Iannucci, David Schneider, and Ian Martin based on the graphic novel by Fabien Nury and Thierry Robin; A Star Is Born – Eric Roth, Bradley Cooper, and Will Fetters based on the script of the 1937 film of the same name by William A. Wellman, Robert Carson, Dorothy Parker and Alan Campbell
Best Animated Film	Best Foreign Language Film
Spider-Man: Into the Spider-Verse – Bob Persichetti, Peter Ramsey, and Rodney Rothman: Incredibles 2 – Brad Bird; Isle of Dogs – Wes Anderson; Ralph Breaks the Internet – Rich Moore and Phil Johnston; Ruben Brandt, Collector – Milorad Krstić	Roma (Mexico) in Spanish – Directed by Alfonso Cuarón: Burning (South Korea) in Korean – Directed by Lee Chang-dong; Capernaum (Lebanon) in Arabic – Directed by Nadine Labaki; Cold War (Poland) in Polish – Directed by Paweł Pawlikowski; Shoplifters (Japan) in Japanese – Directed by Hirokazu Kore-eda
Best Documentary Film	Best Original Score
Minding the Gap – Bing Liu: Free Solo – Elizabeth Chai Vasarhelyi and Jimmy Chin; RBG – Betsy West and Julie Cohen; Three Identical Strangers – Tim Wardle; Won't You Be My Neighbor? – Morgan Neville	If Beale Street Could Talk – Nicholas Britell: First Man – Justin Hurwitz; Mandy – Jóhann Jóhannsson; Suspiria – Thom Yorke; You Were Never Really Here – Jonny Greenwood
Best Production Design	Best Editing
The Favourite – Production Design: Fiona Crombie; Set Decoration: Alice Felton: Annihilation – Production Design: Mark Digby; Set Decoration: Michelle Day; Black Panther – Production Design: Hannah Beachler; Set Decoration: Jay Hart; Paddington 2 – Production Design: Gary Williamson; Set Decoration: Cathy Cosgrove; Roma – Production Design: Eugenio Caballero; Set Decoration: Barbara Enriquez	Roma – Alfonso Cuarón and Adam Gough: First Man – Tom Cross; The Other Side of the Wind – Bob Murawski and Orson Welles; Widows – Joe Walker; You Were Never Really Here – Joe Bini
Best Cinematography	Best Use of Visual Effects
Roma – Alfonso Cuarón: Cold War – Łukasz Żal; The Favourite – Robbie Ryan; First Man – Linus Sandgren; If Beale Street Could Talk – James Laxton	Annihilation: Black Panther; First Man; Mission: Impossible – Fallout; Paddington 2
Most Promising Filmmaker	Most Promising Performer
Ari Aster – Hereditary: Bo Burnham – Eighth Grade; Bradley Cooper – A Star Is Born; Bing Liu – Minding the Gap; Boots Riley – Sorry to Bother You	Elsie Fisher – Eighth Grade: Yalitza Aparicio – Roma; Lady Gaga – A Star Is Born; Thomasin McKenzie – Leave No Trace; John David Washington – BlacKkKlansman and Monsters and Men

== Awards breakdown ==
The following films received multiple nominations:

Nominations	Film
9	Roma
7	The Favourite
7	A Star Is Born
4	First Man
4	First Reformed
4	If Beale Street Could Talk
4	You Were Never Really Here
3	Black Panther
3	Can You Ever Forgive Me?
3	Eighth Grade
3	Hereditary
2	Annihilation
2	BlacKkKlansman
2	Burning
2	Cold War
2	Minding the Gap
2	Paddington 2
2	Vice

The following films received multiple wins:

Wins	Film
5	Roma
2	The Favourite
2	First Reformed
2	Hereditary
2	If Beale Street Could Talk
