= Rise of the Raven =

Hungarian–Austrian biographical historical television series about John Hunyadi

- Hungarian: Hunyadi
- Genre: Historical drama; Action
- Created by: Balázs Lengyel
- Based on: Hunyadi series by Mór Bán
- Showrunner: Balázs Lengyel
- Directed by: Robert Dornhelm; Orsi Nagypál; Attila Szász; Balázs Lengyel
- Starring: Cast and characters
- Theme music composer: Asher Goldschmidt
- Countries of origin: Hungary; Austria
- Original languages: The characters speak in several languages: Hungarian, Czech, German, Italian, Latin, Polish, Romanian, Serbian, Turkish
- No. of seasons: 1
- No. of episodes: 10

Production
- Executive producer: Robert Lantos
- Production companies: National Film Institute Hungary (financed) Ft15.225 billion; Beta Film (financed); Serendipity Point Films (co-production); ORF (co-production); TV2 (co-production); HG Media (co-production); Twin Media (co-production); MR Films (co-production)
- Budget: Ft25.6 billion ($70 million)

Original release
- Network: TV2, Super TV2
- Release: 8 March – 19 April 2025
- Network: ORF1
- Release: 21 April – 19 May 2025

Rise of the Raven (Hungarian: Hunyadi, German: Hunyadi – Aufstieg zur Macht) is a Hungarian–Austrian biographical historical television series about John Hunyadi that premiered in 2025. The production was based on the Hungarian novel series Hunyadi by Mór Bán, and the lead writer of the TV series was Balázs Lengyel.

== Overview ==
The Rise of the Raven, is a ten-part historical TV series about John Hunyadi that debuted in 2024 in Cannes Film Festival. The series was made with over 600 international actors, and the production is unique in that the actors speak in their native languages, adding to its historical authenticity. In Rise of the Raven, John Hunyadi devotes his life to defending Europe against the Ottoman invasion. Amid political intrigue and betrayal, and conspiracies between noble families from Hungary, Austria, Italy, Poland, Serbia, his key allies are his wife Elizabeth, who fights alongside him, and Mara, his first love, who becomes Sultan Murad's concubine. As the Ottoman Empire mobilizes an enormous army to conquer Hungary, Hunyadi leads his smaller but formidable forces into battle, sealing a hard-fought victory at the Siege of Belgrade.

== Production ==
The Hunyadi series, produced with the support of the National Film Institute of Hungary (NFI), is executive produced by Canadian-Hungarian producer Robert Lantos, with episodes directed by Oscar nominee and Emmy Award winner Robert Dornhelm and Attila Szász, Orsi Nagypál, and Balázs Lengyel.

The film is based Hunyadi novel series by Mór Bán. The Hunyadi TV show's multilingual approach – with dialogue in Hungarian, German, Turkish, Italian, Serbian, Czech, and more – enhances its historical authenticity by capturing the cultural diversity of 15th-century Europe. Its pan-European co-production model and grand scope have established Rise of the Raven as one of the most significant Hungarian-led television projects to date.

Producer Robert Lantos said in his statement, "The story of Hunyadi shows the journey of a village boy who became a fearless warrior and later the savior of Europe. Since childhood, I've been fascinated by the story of the noon bell, and with this series, we have the opportunity to share a story that's so familiar to us, Hungarians, with the entire world".

The project is co-financed by the National Film Institute of Hungary and Beta Film GmbH.

== Cast and characters ==
Actor	Character	Description
Gellért L. Kádár	John Hunyadi	A Hungarian military leader, Voivode of Transylvania, and Governor of the Kingdom of Hungary. He grew into a man driven to protect his people, by defending Hungary and Christian Europe, he became a legend.
Vivien Rujder	Elizabeth Szilágyi	The wife of John Hunyadi. Elizabeth fights bravely for her family and country on the home front while Hunyadi is away, and even joins him on the battlefield.
Franciska Törőcsik	Mara Branković	Daughter of the Despot of Serbia, Hunyadi's first love, later the wife of Sultan Murad II of the Ottoman Empire. The strong-minded woman is determined to take her life back into her own hands.
Ernő Fekete	Ulrich Cillei	Count of Cilli, Ban of Croatia, Slavonia and Dalmatia. A Hungarian nobleman with numerous connections and great influence. Power-hungry and ambitious, he is also one of Hunyadi's fiercest enemies. Cillei manipulates state affairs through his family connections.
Balázs Medveczky	Nicholas Újlaki	A Hungarian nobleman, Ban of Croatia, Slavonia, Dalmatia and Macsó, Voivode of Transylvania, one of the largest landowners in the country. A member of the wealthiest and one of the oldest families in the Kingdom of Hungary, he is a true oddsmaker who always chooses sides or allies according to where he can expect to make the most profit.
László Mátray	Michael Szilágyi	A Hungarian count, brother of Elizabeth Szilágyi the wife of John Hunyadi. Captain of Belgrade during the Ottoman siege.
László Gálffi	King Sigismund of Hungary	Sigismund is one of the most important figures of late medieval Europe. King of Hungary, Germany and Bohemia, later Holy Roman Emperor.
Mariann Hermányi	Elizabeth of Luxembourg	Daughter of King Sigismund and Barbara Cillei, wife to Albert Habsburg, then of King Vladislaus, Elizabeth is a spoiled beauty who is impetuous, passionate and easily manipulated.
Murathan Muslu	Sultan Murad II of the Ottoman Empire	Sultan Murad of the ever-expanding Ottoman Empire has set his sights on territorial conquest, but as Hunyadi's childhood love, Mara, enters his life, his resolve begins to weaken.
Ulaşcan Kutlu	Sultan Mehmed II of the Ottoman Empire	Murad's second-born son enters the world condemned to death, for the harsh inheritance system of the Edirne court dictates that upon the Sultan's death, the first-born heir must kill all his siblings.
Balázs Csémy	John Vitéz	John Vitéz, one of the most loyal supporters of Hunyadi. From a talented clergyman's apprentice, he comes to be an influential statesman.
Áron Forrai	Ladislaus Hunyadi	Son of John Hunyadi.
Krisztián Csákvári	King Vladislaus, King of Poland and Hungary	King of Poland, Vladislaus arrives at the invitation of the divided Hungarian nobility to take the throne in place of Ladislaus V, who had been crowned as an infant. By accepting the crown, Vladislaus becomes the joint ruler of the Kingdom of Hungary and Poland.
Gábor Nagypál	Vlad II Dracul	Vlad is the ruler of Wallachia and a vassal of King Sigismund of Hungary, whose country is under constant threat from the expanding Ottoman Empire. He is notorious for impaling his opponents.
Dino Benjamin	Vlad the Impaler	Son of Vlad Dracul.
Cornelius Obonya	Frederick Habsburg	He is the head of House Habsburg with enormous political influence and the uncle of Albert Habsburg.
Laurence Rupp	Albert Habsburg	He is the nephew of Frederick Habsburg. Married to King Sigismund's daughter, Elizabeth of Luxembourg, Albert is crowned following Sigismund's death, becoming the first Habsburg ruler in Hungarian history.
Zsolt László	Simon Kemény	High ranked Hungarian military personnel.
Eszter Ónodi	Barbara Cillei	Wife of King Sigismund.
Thomas Trabacchi	John of Capistrano	A Franciscan monk, Capistrano recognizes the young Hungarian as the white knight from his vision when he meets John Hunyadi in Rome.
Giancarlo Giannini	Pope Eugene IV	Head of the Catholic Church. Eugene follows the career of John Hunyadi from afar. He authorises the Edirne Crusade of 1444.
Péter Jankovics	Julian Cesarini	Papal envoy, supporting the Hungarian-led Crusade against Ottoman Empire.
Francesco Acquaroli	Filippo Maria Visconti	Duke of Milan.
Elena Rusconi	Giulietta Di Brienza	Visconti’s niece, the secret weapon to keep Hunyadi in Milan in Italy.
Rade Šerbedžija	George Branković	The Despot of Serbia, father of Mara, was a vassal to the Hungarian king, tasked with defending the castles along the Hungarian–Serbian border and strengthening the frontier against Ottoman invasions. But Branković not only betrays his allies, he also sacrifices his beloved daughter, Mara, sending her to the Sultan's court as a guarantee to preserve peace.
Serkan Çolak	Halil Pasha	Grand Vizier of the Ottoman Empire.
Karel Roden	Jan Matějčík	Hussite soldier in the army of Hunyadi.
Kristóf Fröhlich	Jakub	Hussite soldier in the army of Hunyadi.
Judit Pecháček	Aliya Hatun	Murad II's harem madam who introduces Mara Branković to Sultan's harem in Edirne.
Emőke Zsigmond	Mary Rozgonyi	Wife of Nicholas Újlaki.
Martin Gyetvai	Young John Hunyadi	John Hunyad as child.

== Episodes ==
Episode	Title	Directed by	Written by	Original release date
1	"The Shadow of God"	Robert Dornhelm	Zsófia Ruttkay, Balázs Lengyel, Mór Bán	8 March 2025
After watching his family being slaughtered by a marauding Turkish squad, John Hunyadi dedicates his life to the fight against the Ottomans. However, while serving in the court of the Serbian despot, Đurađ Branković, he quickly becomes involved in the political games of Central Europe, sooner than he expected, when the Hungarian king’s visit is disrupted by the arrival of the Ottoman army. While the Hungarian and Ottoman forces clash near the fortress of Golubac, another battle for survival is taking place on a different front, with the stakes being John's love for Mara, the daughter of the Serbian despot, Branković. For the sake of Serbian-Ottoman peace, Mara enters Sultan Murad II’s harem, and John earns the favor of the Hungarian king, Sigismund, due to his heroic actions in the Battle of Golubac. It seems that their fates are irrevocably separated. However, no one yet suspects that, alongside the threat from the Turks, dangerous forces are working within the king’s inner circle, particularly in the form of Ulrik Celje.
2	"The King of Kings"	Robert Dornhelm	Balázs Lovas, Balázs Lengyel, Mór Bán	8 March 2025
Hunyadi, struggling with the continuous Turkish incursions, goes to Buda to seek the king’s help, but Sigismund immediately conscripts him into his banderium, against his will. With the help of his friend John Vitéz and Elizabeth Szilágyi, John comes to realize that the time spent in Buda and the service to the king is the price he must pay in order to one day confront his enemies. Before long, thanks to his strategic talent, he becomes Sigismund’s best soldier. Meanwhile, Sigismund seeks to solidify his political influence by uniting the House of Luxembourg and the House of Habsburg, marrying his daughter, Elizabeth, to Albert of Habsburg. When Sigismund sets off on a European tour to obtain the Holy Roman Emperor’s crown, he takes John with him, who has no idea that he is becoming a part of the king’s power plays. At the same time, Mara must endure the daily life of the harem, which is disrupted by the arrival of a new girl. Mara is not afraid to stand up even to Murad himself, but events soon spiral beyond her control.
3	"Emperor of East and West"	Orsi Nagypál	Balázs Lengyel, Attila Veres, Mór Bán	9 March 2025
After Sigismund reaches an agreement with Visconti, the Duke of Milan, Hunyadi remains in Italy as a mercenary soldier. Visconti quickly realizes that Hunyadi is the key to his successes, and does everything in his power to keep the warrior in Milan. To that end, he enlists the help of his niece, Giulietta, who cuts Hunyadi off from all news of home, even the birth of his son. This leaves Elizabeth Szilágyi to face motherhood and the affairs of the Hunyadi estates alone, in a world ruled by men. Meanwhile, Mara is locked in a struggle against the intrigues of the Edirne harem, alongside the young Mehmed. Only now does Mara begin to realize the cruel laws required to maintain the Empire’s stability. At the same time, the aging and ailing Sigismund of Luxembourg secures the crown of the Holy Roman Emperor. Yet Ulrich and Frederick, head of the House of Habsburg, see a new, darker opportunity in the king’s deteriorating condition.
4	"Lord of Life and Death"	Orsi Nagypál	Balázs Lengyel, Attila Veres, Mór Bán	15 March 2025
With the death of Sigismund, Albert of Habsburg ascends to the Hungarian throne. The pious new king soon finds himself caught in the games of demanding barons and his strong-willed wife, Elizabeth. Although Elizabeth understands the importance of producing an heir to the throne, she has been unsuccessfully trying to seduce her husband for years. Eventually, under the influence of Ulrik Celje, she resorts to a much darker solution. Meanwhile, the Hungarian baronial leagues also expand their power, persuading the new king to agree that their troops cannot be summoned for campaigns outside the country’s borders. When Murad launches a campaign for the Serbian fortress of Smederevo, Hungarian assistance arrives only in the form of Hunyadi. The nobility, camped at the border, have no idea that they are exposing themselves to a danger even greater than battle. Thus, Hunyadi must once again fight a desperate struggle against the overwhelming Ottoman forces, using a battle plan that surprises everyone. Meanwhile, Mara, acting as an Ottoman envoy, tries to reach an agreement with her brothers defending the fortress of Smederevo, but the Brankovićs refuse to break again.
5	"The Faithful"	Orsi Nagypál	Balázs Lovas, Balázs Lengyel, Mór Bán	15 March 2025
After Elizabeth of Luxembourg proclaims her newborn child as Albert's son and heir, she and Ulrik Celje steal the Holy Crown to have the infant crowned king. In response, John Vitéz, with the help of Elizabeth Szilágyi, invites the young Polish king to the country, and with the support of part of the nobility and the will of the people, Vladislaus is also crowned. Amid the double coronation, Hunyadi is also forced to rely on the strength of the people, preparing for yet another battle. In the Battle of the Iron Gates, he can only count on the enraged peasants and the duplicitous Baron Újlaki to face the vastly superior sultan’s army. Murad strikes a deal with the Voivode of Wallachia, Vlad, who pays a high price for the sultan’s trust. The young Mehmed also accompanies his father to battle, to fulfill his tragic fate.
6	"The Infidels"	Attila Szász	Zsófia Ruttkay, Balázs Lovas, Balázs Lengyel, Mór Bán	22 March 2025
Pope Eugene IV orders a pan-European crusade, appointing John Hunyadi as its leader following the victory at the Iron Gates. However, his envoy, Cardinal Cesarini, uses the organization of the crusade to strengthen his own position and begins to gain the trust of the young King Vladislaus. First and foremost, by papal decree, the identity of the Hungarian monarch must be clarified, King Vladislaus and Elizabeth of Luxembourg are forced to reach an agreement. Meanwhile, succession conflicts in Edirne intensify, and the retiring Murad compels Mehmed to take action. The second-born son resolves to commit a terrible act for the sake of his survival. Vladislaus nearly concludes peace with the sultan, but a sudden tragedy ultimately triggers the crusade toward Edirne. Hunyadi once again faces political conflict when he is confronted with Cesarini’s influence over the young king’s will.
7	"Allah's Earthly Regent"	Robert Dornhelm, Attila Szász	Balázs Lengyel, Mór Bán	29 March 2025
The crusade, launched late and led by Cesarini, marches toward Edirne, while Hunyadi must contend with internal conflicts and the worsening weather. Meanwhile, Mehmed is given an opportunity by his father to solidify his position as heir to the throne. When unexpected news arrives from Italy to the Hungarian army, the fate of the campaign appears sealed. Hunyadi ultimately takes command and faces overwhelming odds on the field of Varna. After the battle, as Hunyadi and his forces attempt to return home through enemy territory in Wallachia, Mehmed turns to Mara for help in claiming the throne, unaware that his father has already uncovered his secret.
8	"The Lord of All the Lords of the World"	Orsi Nagypál	Balázs Lengyel, Attila Veres, Mór Bán	5 April 2025
Fleeing from the Battle of Varna, Hunyadi and his men are captured by the Voivode of Wallachia, Vlad, along with his son and brother-in-law. Elizabeth is forced to act before her family falls into Turkish hands, but her only hope is Nicholas Újlaki, who demands a heavy price for his help. Meanwhile, in Edirne, Mehmed begins his reign as Sultan. However, when it becomes clear that Mara’s loyalty still lies with Murad, the young prince makes a decision that neither of them could have anticipated. After escaping from captivity in Wallachia, Hunyadi heads to the field of Rákos for the governor’s election, despite his wife’s protests. Yet, during the election, another betrayal is uncovered, and Hunyadi realizes that the country needs him not just as a military leader, but for something much more.
9	"The Refuge of All the World's Unfortunates"	Robert Dornhelm, Attila Szász	Balázs Lovas, Zsófia Ruttkay, Attila Veres, Balázs Lengyel, Mór Bán	12 April 2025
In order to resolve the escalating conflict, a political marriage is arranged between the children of Ulrik Celje and the newly elected governor, Hunyadi. The wedding of Matthias and Elizabeth prevents the looming war, but it also changes the lives of the two families for many years to come. When news of the fall of Constantinople reaches Europe, the Christian world begins to stir. Disillusioned with politics, Hunyadi commands his troops to march to the gates of Europe, to Belgrade, to face the approaching Ottoman army. The time has come for him to use all his influence and seek the support of the nobility, will he gain the backing of the barons as governor? Meanwhile, Elizabeth must face a different deadly threat when the little Elizabeth’s life is put in danger, which could seal Matthias’ fate as well.
10	"To Die as a Hero"	Balázs Lengyel	Balázs Lovas, Zsófia Ruttkay, Attila Veres, Balázs Lengyel, Mór Bán	19 April 2025
While Újlaki and Matthias fight for their lives, fleeing the wrath of Ulrik Celje, the two-week-long siege of Belgrade reaches a turning point with Hunyadi’s arrival. The Hungarian defenders are running out of strength, yet they are ready to fight to the last breath under Hunyadi's leadership. However, the presence of their enemy also impacts the Ottoman army, causing them to press on relentlessly. In the midst of what seems to be a hopeless battle, Hunyadi receives unexpected aid. Will he be able to turn yet another impossible situation into an advantage, with the fate of all Europe hanging in the balance? Will Sultan Mehmed manage to surpass his father?

== Release ==
The Rise of the Raven series debuted at MIPCOM Cannes on 22 October 2024.

The TV2 Group acquired the broadcasting rights for Hungary and Slovenia. The Hungarian premiere of the series took place on 8 March 2025 on TV2, while the Slovenian premiere aired on 6 April 2025 on Planet TV.

The Austrian broadcasting rights were acquired by ORF, with the premiere aired on 21 April 2025.

The Hunyadi TV series arrived on Netflix on 20 April 2025, one day after the final episode aired in Hungary.

It was released on MagentaTV+ in Germany on 5 June 2025.

The Hunyadi series is set to premiere in the Primetime section of the Toronto Film Festival in 2025 and will be available on a Canadian CBC streaming platform starting in September. Following the prestigious festival premiere, CBC will bring the ten-part series to Canadian audiences on their streaming channel CBC GEM from 19 September 2025. Producer Robert Lantos, a Canadian of Hungarian descent, highlighted the cultural importance of the series being selected by TIFF in an official statement: "János Hunyadi was the savior of Europe in the 15th century, and now he begins his conquest of the Americas. TIFF rarely selects television series, and only those that are artistically exceptional, original, and impactful. As a Hungarian Canadian, I'm proud that Hunyadi will debut here in my home."

The Croatian broadcasting rights were bought by HRT, with the premier aired on HRT1 on 1 April 2026.

== Reception ==
The series, which dramatizes the life of John Hunyadi and the historic Siege of Belgrade, originally premiered on TV2 in Hungary, where it broke multiple viewership records. Following its domestic run, it went on to become the most-watched series on Netflix Hungary.

The Hunyadi series broke viewing records in Hungary, but has also become hugely popular among Austrian viewers. In Austria, the show performed strongly despite its notably one-sided and negative portrayal of Emperor Frederick III.

The Hunyadi series has already impressed audiences in Italy (RAI), Croatia (HRT), Germany (Telekom Deutschland), Slovakia (STVR), Switzerland (Blue TV), Israel (YES), Slovenia, and the Czech Republic (ČT2).
