= Kalaka =

Kalaka may refer to:

- Kaláka, Hungarian folk music group
- Kalaka (state constituency), represented in the Sarawak State Legislative Assembly
