= Stripy =

2015 Iranian animated musical short film

Stripy is a 2015 Iranian animated musical short film directed by Babak and Behnoud Nekooei that features no dialogue. produced by Ghonbad Caboud studio Stripy has been screened at the 2015 Annecy International Animation Film Festival, 2015 Anima Mondi, 2015 New York International Children's Film Festival, 2022 Tehran International Animation Festival, 2015 Kecskemét Animation Film Festival and the 2016 San Francisco International Film Festival. it was also part of the 2015 Animation show of shows, notably being the first Iranian animated short to be screened in US theaters, making it eligible to participate in the academy awards, no other animated short from Iran has been screened in US theaters since. Stripy is the first Iranian animated short to qualify for the academy awards.

== Plot ==
At a massive factory, the workers have all been given one simple instruction: paint stripes on the boxes. The work is getting done in the usual, monotonous way. that is until one of the workers decides to paint his boxes a little differently. Soon after all workers start doing the same as he is once again made into a conformist.

== Soundtrack ==
The only track featured in the animated short is the Hungarian Dance No 5 by the German composer Johannes Brahms.

== Critical reception ==
- Hollywood Reporter described Stripy as "all clean, modern angles".
- Ron Diamond, the curator for the Animation show of shows festival described the film as "an homage to Disney".
- Chicago Tribune likened Stripy to "animated Eastern European films from the 1970s."
- IndieWire described Stripys influences as "unmistakable but not without reinvention".
- Ferenc Mikulás, the Kecskemét Animation Film Festivals director, praised stripys musical harmony, saying “The theme and content of ‘Stripy’ is in perfect harmony with its soundtrack. Like this musical piece, the film, itself, has numerous layers and raises a global issue.”
