= Hungarian Folk Tales =

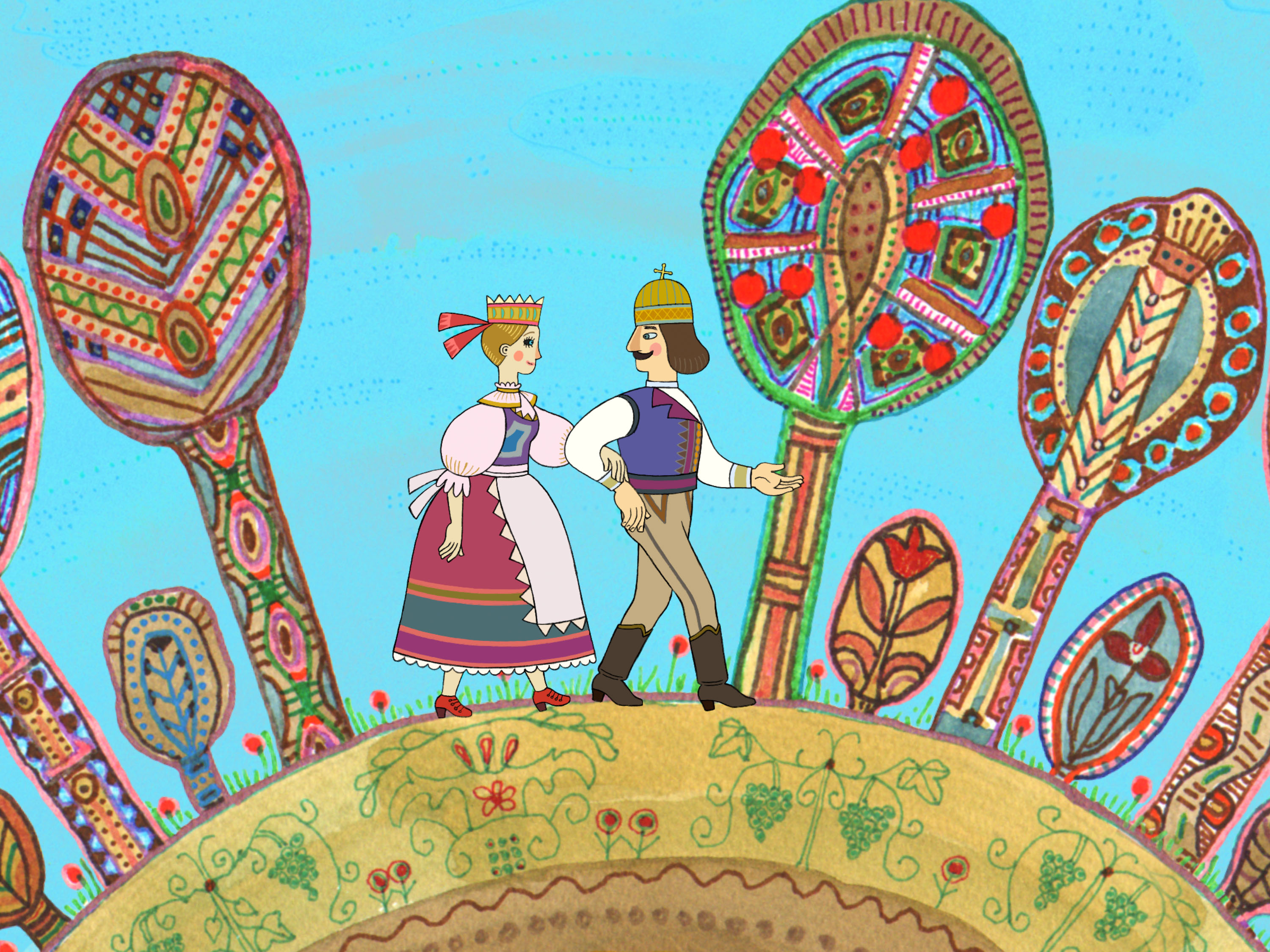
- Also known as: Magyar Népmesék
- Genre: Animation
- Directed by: Marcell Jankovics; Mária Horváth; Zsuzsanna Kricskovics; Lajos Nagy; Pál Tóth
- Narrated by: Gyula Szabó
- Composer: Kaláka
- Country of origin: Hungary
- Original language: Hungarian
- No. of seasons: 9
- No. of episodes: 100

Production
- Running time: 6-10 mins
- Production company: Pannonia Film Studio

Original release
- Network: Magyar Televízió
- Release: 18 September 1980 – 5 March 2012

Hungarian Folk Tales (Hungarian: Magyar népmesék, pronounced [ˈmɒɟɒr ˈneːpmɛʃeːk]) is a Hungarian animated series and one of the first and biggest successes of Pannonia Film Studio, based on studio head Ferenc Mikulás' original idea and directed by Marcell Jankovics. It originally played on television between 1980 and 2012. Episodes are based on Hungarian folk tales, and each one features the specific folk motives of a region of Hungary. The theme song and the score are composed by Kaláka, one of the best known Hungarian folk bands.

A few episodes were dubbed into English and shown in the United States as part of Season 1 of the TV series Long Ago and Far Away in 1989. In 2017, all episodes were dubbed and published on YouTube, receiving over 19 million views by March 2021.
