= The Ambassador to Bern =

- Film poster
- Directed by: Attila Szász
- Starring: János Kulka
- Country of origin: Hungary
- Original language: Hungarian

Production
- Running time: 76 minutes

Original release
- Release: 25 February 2014

The Ambassador to Bern (Hungarian: A berni követ) is a 2014 Hungarian television film directed by Attila Szász. The film is a historical drama based on a true story that took place on August 16, 1958, in Bern, Switzerland, when two Hungarian immigrants attacked the Hungarian embassy in an attempt to draw international attention to the Soviet occupation of Hungary.

The film focuses on the tense standoff between the two armed assailants and the embassy staff, led by the Hungarian ambassador. Through its gripping narrative and atmospheric cinematography, the film explores themes of political oppression, exile, and the struggle for freedom.

János Kulka stars as the Hungarian ambassador, delivering a compelling performance that captures the moral complexities and psychological tension of the situation. The film was praised for its direction, performances, and its ability to convey the emotional and political weight of the events.

The film was first released on Hungarian television on February 25, 2014, and later screened at various international film festivals, including the Cairo International Film Festival, where it received critical acclaim.

== Plot ==
The film is set in the Cold War era and opens with a dramatic scene at the Hungarian embassy in Bern. Two young Hungarian refugees, armed and desperate, storm the embassy with the intention of taking hostages. Their goal is to protest the Hungarian government, which was under Soviet control following the 1956 Hungarian Revolution. The film then unfolds in real-time, with the ambassador and his staff trying to manage the escalating crisis while under extreme pressure from both the attackers and the Swiss authorities.

As negotiations proceed, the tension between the assailants and the embassy staff becomes more intense, revealing deep emotional scars left by the 1956 Revolution and the ongoing oppression in Hungary. The film delves into the motivations of the attackers, the moral dilemmas faced by the ambassador, and the broader implications of the standoff for international diplomacy during the Cold War.

== Cast ==
- János Kulka as The Ambassador
- Tamás Szabó Kimmel as József, one of the assailants
- Dorka Gryllus as Anna, the ambassador's wife
- Rozi Lovas as Klára, a young embassy staff member
- Gábor Hevér as László, the other assailant

== Production ==
The film was produced as a part of the Hungarian Television Film Fund's initiative to create high-quality television films that highlight significant historical and cultural moments in Hungarian history. Director Attila Szász, known for his meticulous attention to detail and historical accuracy, worked closely with historians to ensure that the film was as authentic as possible. The film's production involved recreating the Hungarian embassy in Bern, with set designs that reflected the period's atmosphere.

== Reception ==
Upon its release, The Ambassador to Bern received positive reviews from critics. It was praised for its tight script, intense performances, and the way it captured the political atmosphere of the time. Critics noted that the film successfully combined elements of a political thriller with a deep emotional narrative, making it both engaging and thought-provoking.

The film also garnered attention at international film festivals, where it was lauded for its direction and performances, particularly that of János Kulka. The film was also noted for shedding light on a lesser-known but significant event in Cold War history.

== Awards and nominations ==
The Ambassador to Bern was nominated for several awards at film festivals, including the Cairo International Film Festival, where it received special recognition for its direction and historical significance.
