= Vilmos Gryllus =

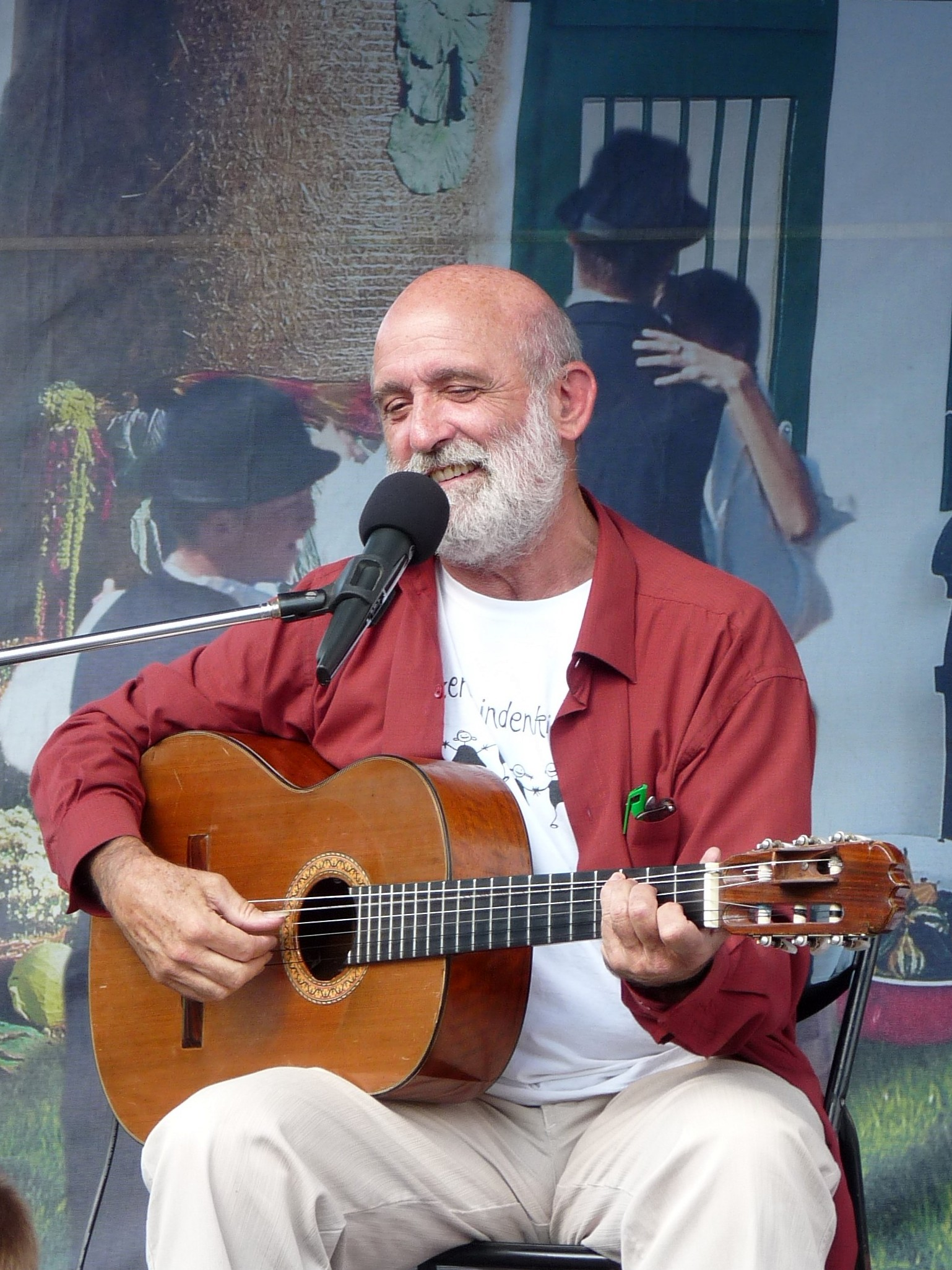
- In 2013

Background information
- Born: Gryllus Vilmos; 28 October 1951 (age 75); Budapest
- Genre: folk music
- Occupations: musician, performer, composer
- Years active: 1969–present
- Website: www.gryllus.hu

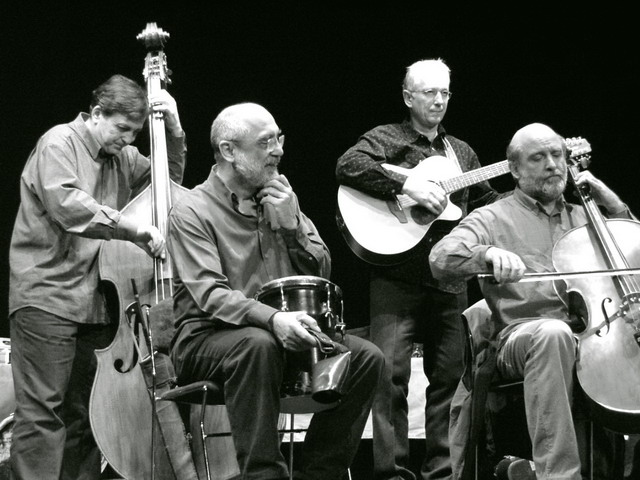
With Kaláka (right)

Vilmos Gryllus (28 October 1951) is a Hungarian musician, performer and composer, founding member of folk music group Kaláka, and winner of the Kossuth Prize (2000).

== Background ==
Vilmos Gryllus was born in Budapest to Vilmosné Gryllus and Éva Fogarassy. His elder brother is musician Dániel Gryllus, also a founding member of Kaláka. Gryllus studied at the Faculty of Architecture of the Budapest University of Technology and Economics, graduating in 1976. In 1969, he co-founded Kaláka together with his brother, Dániel, along with István Mikó and Balázs Radványi. In 1980, he led a radio show called Ki kopog? ("Who's Knocking?"). In 1991, he and Péter Levente created the successful children's TV show Égbőlpottyant mesék ("Tales from the Sky") where children could send their drawings to them and they would create tales based on the drawings. Since 1996 he has been performing with Kaláka again, with a repertoire consisting of poems set to music.

== Awards ==
- Kossuth Prize (2000)
- Prima Primissima Prize (for Kaláka, 2004)

== Sources ==
- MTI ki kicsoda 2009. ed. Hermann Péter. Budapest: Magyar Távirati Iroda. 2008. ISBN 978-963-1787-283
- Gryllus family home page
- Kaláka home page
