= The Exam (2011 film) =

- Film poster
- A vizsga
- Directed by: Péter Bergendy
- Starring: Zsolt Nagy; János Kulka
- Release date: 13 October 2011
- Running time: 89 minutes
- Country: Hungary
- Language: Hungarian

The Exam (Hungarian: A vizsga) is a 2011 Hungarian drama film directed by Péter Bergendy.

== Plot ==
In Budapest in 1957, a year after the failure of the Hungarian uprising, Jung is a mid-level agent informing on many other citizens who come to report to him. He is in charge for an elaborate testing process to ascertain loyalty to Kádár's regime, but he does not realize that he is being watched and photographed too, by his superior and mentor, Marko.

Jung receives a visit from Eva and around the relationship between them the story unfolds.

== Cast ==
- Zsolt Nagy as András Jung
- János Kulka as Pál Markó
- Péter Scherer as Emil Kulcsár
- Gabriella Hámori as Éva Gáti

== Production ==
The Exam' is directed by Péter Bergendy.
