= Chameleon (2008 Hungarian film) =

2008 Hungarian comedy film

- Film poster
- Hungarian: Kaméleon
- Directed by: Krisztina Goda
- Screenplay by: Krisztina Goda; Divinyi Réka
- Produced by: Gábor Kálomista; Mónika Mécs; Ernő Mesterházy
- Starring: Ervin Nagy; Zsolt Trill; Gabriella Hámori; János Kulka; Sándor Csányi
- Cinematography: Buda Gulyás; Tamás Babos
- Edited by: Zoltán Kovács
- Music by: Gábor Madarász
- Distributed by: Hungaricom
- Release date: 4 December 2008 (Hungary)
- Running time: 108 minutes
- Country: Hungary
- Language: Hungarian

Chameleon (Hungarian: Kaméleon) is a 2008 Hungarian comedy film co-written and directed by Krisztina Goda. It was Hungary's submission to the 82nd Academy Award for Best Foreign Language Films.

== Synopsis ==
Gábor and his friend Tibi, who grew up in an orphanage together, are professional con artists who clean offices at night to search for personal information to identify potential victims. With Tibi's support, Gábor uses the information to charm wealthy women into accepting his wedding proposals, gains access to their bank accounts, and abandons them before the ceremony after robbing them. While cleaning a psychologist's office, he finds the file of Hanna, a beautiful dancer injured in a recent car accident. He decides to "take on her case" but ends up falling in love, which complicates his plans.

== Cast ==
- Ervin Nagy as Gábor Farkas
- Zsolt Trill as Tibi Szabó
- Gabriella Hámori as Hanna Hartay
- János Kulka as Marton Ferenc
- Sándor Csányi as Márk Torsa
