= János Kulka (actor) =

Hungarian actor (born 1958)

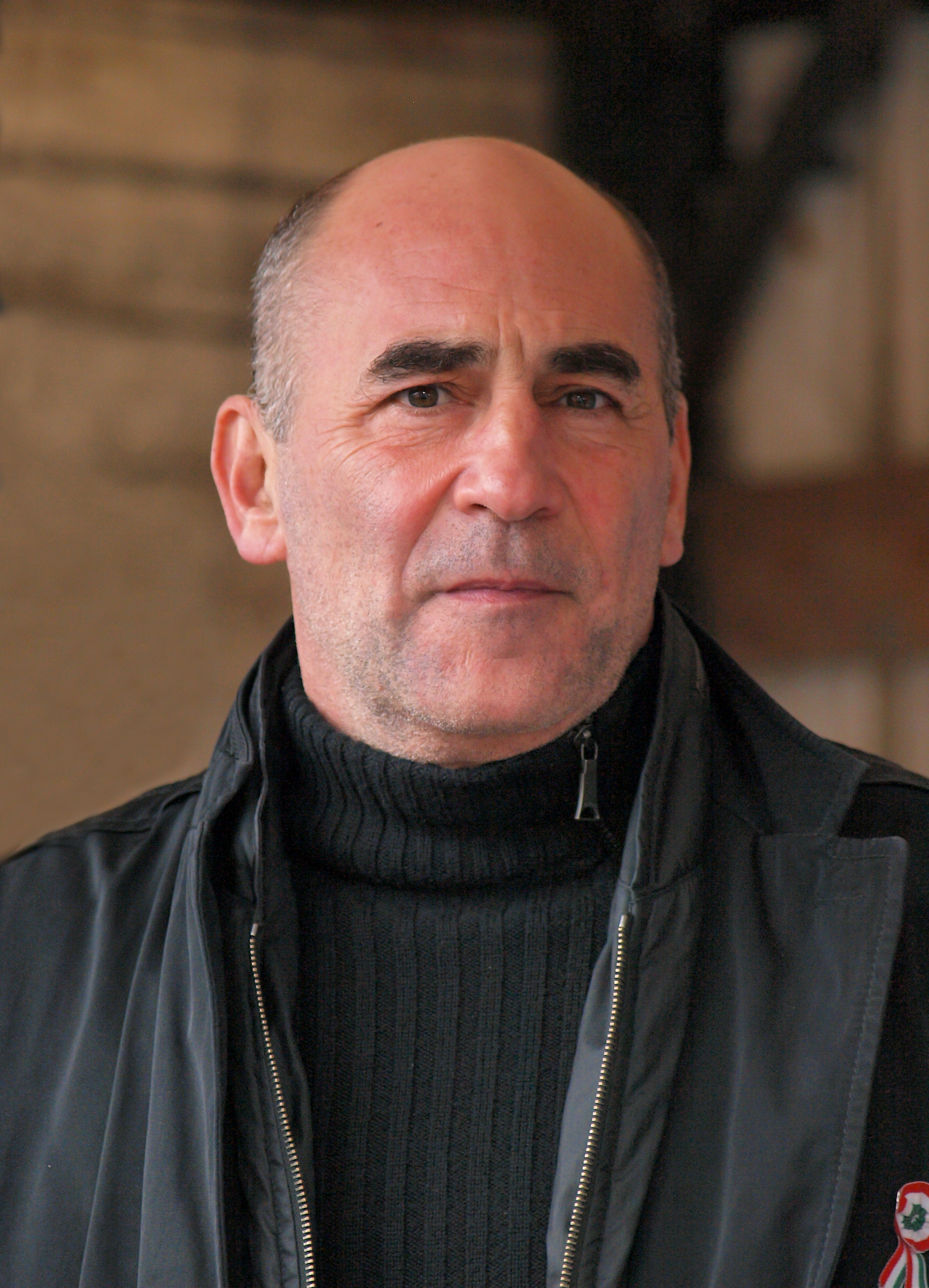
- János Kulka on 15 March 2015
- Born: 11 November 1958 (age 67); Budapest, Hungary
- Occupation: Actor
- Years active: 1980–present

János Kulka (born 11 November 1958) is a Hungarian actor. He appeared in more than fifty films since 1980, and is a leading stage actor of his generation in Hungary. He received the Kossuth and Jászai Mari Prize; he is an eternal member of the Society of Immortals.

== Early life ==
Kulka was born in Budapest, but spent most of his childhood in Szeged, where his father, Frigyes Kulka was an internationally acclaimed surgeon. His father came from Ipolyság (currently Šahy in Slovakia), and was a Holocaust survivor, who lost his family during the war. His mother, Eszter Boleman was recruited as an anchorwoman for the first experimental television broadcasts in Hungary, but the revolution in 1956 interrupted her career. His sister, Janina Kulka is a full professor of pathology at the Semmelweis University.

== Career ==
He started his career as a child actor at the National Theatre of Szeged, and wanted to study liberal arts, but eventually changed his mind and was admitted to the Academy of Drama and Film in Budapest. After his graduation in 1981, he joined the National Theatre of Pécs. In 1985 he signed on to the Gergely Csiky Theatre of Kaposvár, which was a leading Hungarian theatre of the time. Kulka considers these years to have a huge impact on his way of acting, and benefitted much from this experience later in his career. From 1993 he was the member of the Radnóti Miklós Theatre and in 2003 he joined the Hungarian National Theatre, where he stayed for 10 years. In 2013 he didn't renew his contract mainly due to the departure of Róbert Alföldi, who was the director of the theatre for five years. Between 2013 and 2018 he was the member of the Katona József Theatre in Budapest.

Most Hungarians know Kulka as Mágenheim doktor, an emergency physician of high principles from the series Szomszédok (Neighbours), an extremely popular television programme running between 1987 and 1999, depicting the transition of Hungary from socialism into a democratic state. Besides stage acting, he was a prominent voice actor known as the Hungarian voice of Hugh Laurie in House, M.D. and Jeremy Irons in The Borgias.

== Personal life ==
He publicly came out as gay in 2013. In 2016 he suffered a serious stroke resulting an aphasia, which disables his speech and limits his theatrical performances. Ever since he is doing efforts to raise awareness of the disorder.

== Selected filmography ==
Year	Title	Role	Notes
1999	Sunshine	Molnár	
1999	Jacob the Liar	Nathan	
2003	Kontroll		
2008	Chameleon	Dr. Marton Ferenc	
2011	The Exam	Pál Markó	
2014	The Ambassador to Bern		TV
2015	Demimonde	Max Schmidt	
