= Vilmosné Gryllus =

Hungarian chemist (1924–2024)

- Born: 25 August 1924
- Died: 4 October 2024 (aged 100)
- Occupation: Chemist

Vilmosné Gryllus (25 August 1924 – 4 October 2024) was a Hungarian chemist.

== Biography ==
Vilmosné was internationally recognized for her inventions in the sugar industry. For her work she was given the Loránd Eötvös Prize.

Her sons are musicians Dániel Gryllus and Vilmos Gryllus. Her granddaughter is the actress Dorka Gryllus. Vilmosné died in October 2024, at the age of 100.
