= Dorka Gryllus =

Hungarian actress (born 1972)

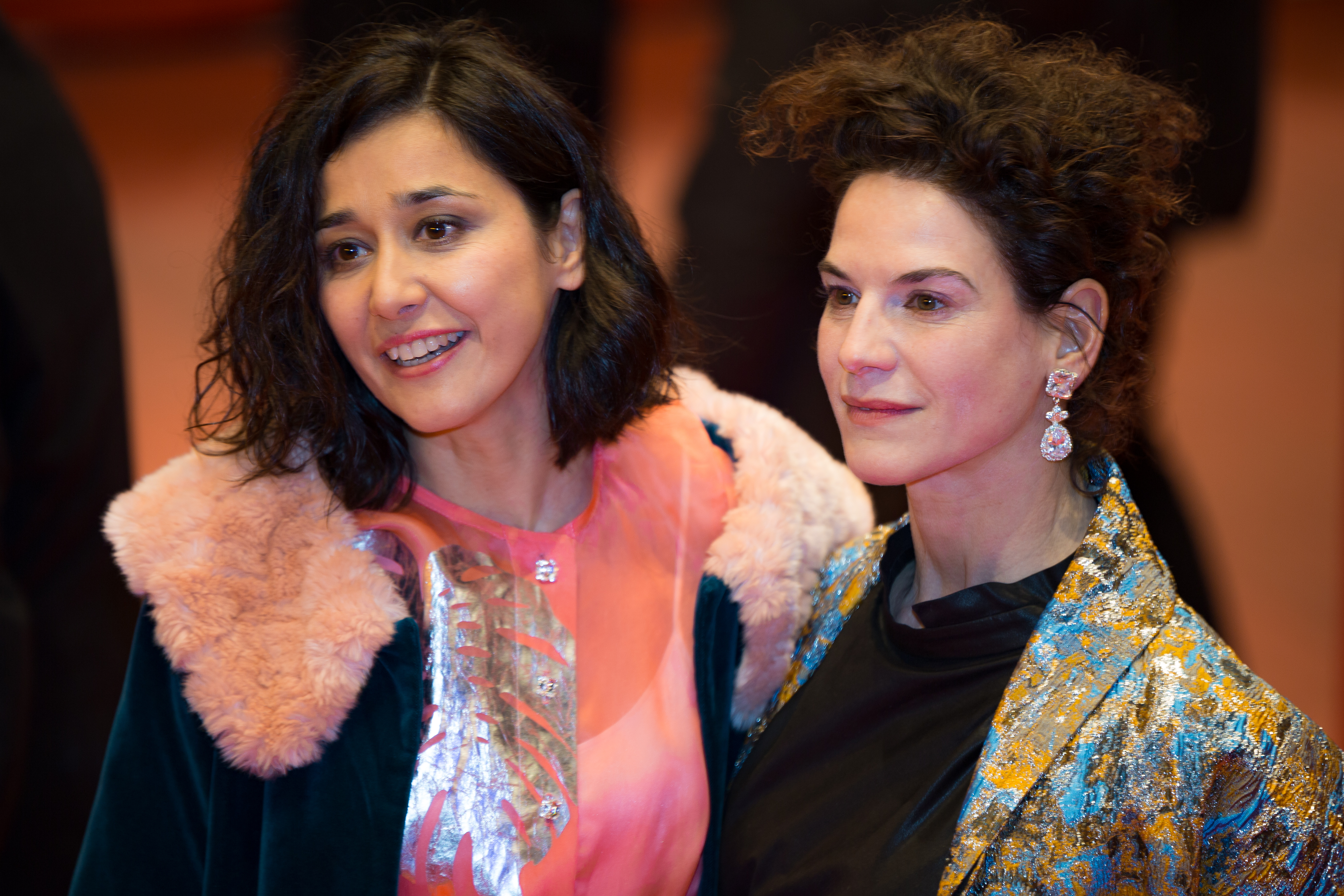
- Gryllus (left) with Bibiana Beglau at the Berlin International Film Festival in 2017
- Born: 26 December 1972 (age 53); Budapest, Hungary
- Occupation: Actress
- Years active: 1995–present
- Spouse: Péter Geszti (2001–2006)
- Partner: Kornél Simon
- Children: 1
- Parents: Katalin Kőváry; Dániel Gryllus
- Relatives: Vilmosné Gryllus (grandmother)

Dorka Gryllus (born 26 December 1972) is a Hungarian film and theatre actress. She is the daughter of Dániel Gryllus, a Hungarian musician, performer and composer, founding member of folk music group Kaláka and Katalin Kőváry, a theatre director and screenwriter. Gryllus grew up in Budapest and graduated from the College of Theater and Film Arts in 1998. Between 1998 and 2003 she was a member of the Gergely Csiky Theater in Kaposvár. Her breakthrough role came in the 2009 film Soul Kitchen. She has appeared in more than sixty films since 1995.

== Selected filmography ==
Year	Title	Role	Notes
1996	The Conquest	Hajnal	
1999	Európa expressz	Student	
2005	Zeit der Wünsche	Esra	
2006	Day of Wrath	Graciela Cabral	
2007	Irina Palm	Luisa	
2008	The World Is Big and Salvation Lurks Around the Corner	Maria	
2009	Soul Kitchen	Anna Mondstein	
2009	The Bone Man	Valeria	
2015	Demimonde	Rózsi Kóbori	
