= Gabriella Hámori =

Hungarian actress

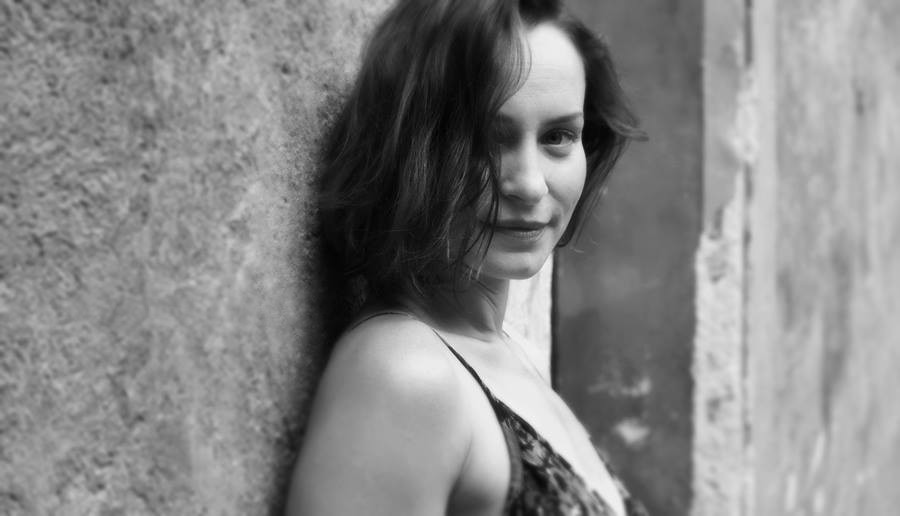
- Photo by Gáspár Stekovics
- Born: 1 November 1978 (age 48); Szarvas, Hungary
- Occupation: Actress
- Years active: 2000–present

Gabriella Hámori (born 1 November 1978) is a Hungarian actress. She appeared in more than twenty films since 2000.

== Selected filmography ==
Year	Title	Role	Notes
2002	A Kind of America	Hitchhiker girl	
2008	Chameleon	Hartay Hanna	
2011	The Exam	Éva Gáti	
2018	Ruben Brandt, Collector	Mimi	Voice
2021	Baptiste (TV series) – Series 2	Kamilla Agoston	
