= Demimonde (film) =

- Félvilág
- Directed by: Attila Szász
- Starring: Patricia Kovács; Dorka Gryllus
- Country of origin: Hungary
- Original language: Hungarian

Production
- Running time: 88 minutes

Original release
- Release: 30 December 2015

Demimonde (Hungarian: Félvilág) is a 2015 Hungarian drama film directed by Attila Szász. It features the story of Elza Mágnás (Emilia Turcsányi), who was killed in 1914 in the water town of Budapest and is well known in contemporary Pest night life. The film itself is based on the events that have taken place and some of the characters are real, but the creators did not seek to reconstruct the original events; the film differs from reality on many points.

The screenplay was written by Norbert Köbli, the main characters are played by Patrícia Kovács, Dorka Gryllus, Laura Döbrösi and János Kulka. Other prominent Hungarian actors appear in minor roles, such as Attila Lőte, Irén Bordán, Katalin Takács or Ferenc Elek. Before the film was made, two contributors, Tamás Mink and one of the episode actors, Péter Haás, died, and the creators therefore dedicated the film to their memory.

The 88-minute film drama was produced with the support of the Media Council's Hungarian Media Patronage Program; was premiered at the Montreal Film Festival on September 6, 2015, and was also introduced at an Indian festival. The first home premiere was on December 8, 2015 at Cinema City MOM Park, and the audience was first seen on the Duna TV show on December 30, 2015.

The film was filmed in 2014 at Lyka-Brauch Castle in Ráckeresztúr.

== Accolades ==
Award	Date of Ceremony	Category	Recipient(s)	Result	Ref
Anchorage International Film Festival		Best Feature Film	Demimonde	Won	
Beloit International Film Festival	March 4, 2017	Best Narrative Feature	Demimonde	Won	

== Cast ==
- Patricia Kovács - Elza Mágnás
- Dorka Gryllus - Rózsi Kóbori
- Laura Döbrösi - Kató Szebeni
- János Kulka - Max Schmidt
- Péter Sándor - Gergely Sóvágó
- Károly Hajduk - Pap
