= Milorad Krstić =

Slovenian-born Hungarian artist and animation director (born 1952)

- Born: 1952 (age 73–74); Dornberk, SR Slovenia, Yugoslavia
- Education: University of Novi Sad
- Known for: Painting, animation, multimedia, scenic design
- Notable work: My Baby Left Me (1995); Das Anatomische Theater (1999); Ruben Brandt, Collector (2018)
- Spouse: Radmila Roczkov

Milorad Krstić (born 1952) is a Slovenian-born painter, animator and multimedia artist of Serbian descent, who has lived and worked in Hungary since 1989. Trained as a lawyer, he abandoned a legal career for the visual arts in the early 1980s and has since worked across painting, comics, photography, animation and scenic design.

His animated short My Baby Left Me (1995) won the Jury Prize Silver Bear for short film at the 45th Berlin International Film Festival, and his first feature, the animated art-heist thriller Ruben Brandt, Collector (2018), premiered on the Piazza Grande at the Locarno Film Festival and won the Grand Prix at Animafest Zagreb.

== Early life and education ==
Krstić was born in 1952 in Dornberk, a village near the Italian border in the Yugoslav republic of Slovenia; he is of Serbian descent. According to a 2018 profile in the Hungarian weekly HVG, his father was a military officer and his mother a housewife. He took a degree in law at the University of Novi Sad in Serbia, painting continuously alongside his studies.

After a series of successful exhibitions in Dubrovnik, Zagreb, Novi Sad and Germany, he gave up law and from 1982 worked full-time as an artist, exhibiting regularly across Europe.

== Career ==
=== Move to Hungary ===
Krstić settled in Hungary in 1989 with his wife Radmila Roczkov, who is also his co-author and collaborator. In 1990 the couple, together with Roczkov's two sisters, opened the Roczkov Gallery on Andrássy Avenue in Budapest — according to HVG, the first private gallery to open in the city after the change of regime. In a 1999 interview with Magyar Narancs he described himself as having lived in Hungary for ten years and being known internationally as a Hungarian artist.

=== Animation and multimedia ===
Krstić's animated short My Baby Left Me (1995), which he wrote and directed, won the Jury Prize Silver Bear for short film at the 45th Berlin International Film Festival, the award for a first film in the short-film section at the Annecy International Animation Film Festival, and prizes for best visual language and best first film at the Kecskemét Animation Film Festival (KAFF) in 1996.

Between 1999 and 2008 he worked on Das Anatomische Theater, a project on the history of the twentieth century that began as an interactive CD-ROM — made with Radmila Roczkov — and later became a multimedia album and a series of exhibitions. The work was shown at Galerija ŠKUC in Ljubljana (2006), at the Likovni Salon in Celje (2007) and, in 2011–2012, at the Kunsthalle in Budapest under the subtitle Simultaneous Games in the Twentieth Century.

In 2019 the Kunsthalle presented his work again in the exhibition Spaces (ap)art — Spirit of the Műcsarnok / Kunsthalle Budapest.

=== Scenic design ===
Krstić has designed sets and visual concepts for Hungarian theatre productions, among them the opening production of the new National Theatre in 2002, Imre Madách's The Tragedy of Man directed by János Szikora, and a series of stagings by the choreographer Csaba Horváth and his Forte Company. He also designed the visual world of Márta Mészáros's short film based on Béla Bartók's The Miraculous Mandarin.

=== Ruben Brandt, Collector ===
Krstić wrote, designed and directed Ruben Brandt, Collector, an English-language animated thriller about a psychotherapist whose patients steal thirteen famous paintings. It premiered on the Piazza Grande at the 2018 Locarno Film Festival. Reviewing it for Variety, Alissa Simon called it a "stylish, fast-paced" feature in which Krstić "literally puts the 'art' in 'arthouse'".

The film won best feature at the Anim'est festival in Bucharest in 2018, the best screenplay award at the 15th Seville European Film Festival — shared with co-writer Radmila Roczkov — and the CICAE Art Cinema Award at the same festival. In 2019 it took the Grand Prix in the feature-film competition at Animafest Zagreb, the Sky Arte award at the Trieste Film Festival, the BeTV award for best animated feature at the Anima festival in Brussels, the audience award at the Animator festival in Poznań, and the Hungarian Film Award for best animated feature.

It was nominated for the Annie Award for best independent animated feature, and was one of twenty-five films submitted for consideration in the animated feature category of the 91st Academy Awards.

== Selected exhibitions ==
- American Dream, Roczkov Gallery, Budapest, 2000
- William Klein, Zoltán Vancsó and Milorad Krstić, MEO Contemporary Art Collection, Budapest, 2004
- Das Anatomische Theater, Galerija ŠKUC, Ljubljana, 2006
- Das Anatomische Theater, Körzőgyár Gallery, Budapest, 2007
- Das Anatomische Theater, Likovni Salon, Celje, 2007
- Das Anatomische Theater, Kunsthalle, Budapest, 2011–2012
- Spaces (ap)art — Spirit of the Műcsarnok / Kunsthalle Budapest, Kunsthalle, Budapest, 2019
- RUBENsremBRANDT, Collegium Hungaricum, Berlin, 2020
- RUBENsremBRANDT, Hungarian Cultural Institute, Stuttgart, 2021

== Filmography ==
Year	Title	Role
1995	My Baby Left Me	Writer, director
1997	Mou-Mush (children's animated series)	Screenwriter
1999	Das Anatomische Theater (interactive CD-ROM)	Writer, director, animation; with Radmila Roczkov
2000	Motel	Screenwriter
2000	A csodálatos mandarin (dir. Márta Mészáros)	Production designer
2001	Undo	Screenwriter
2004	The Adventures of Liam Grant (children's animated series)	Screenwriter
2006	Budapest (documentary)	Writer, director
2018	Ruben Brandt, Collector	Writer, director, production designer, producer

== Theatre ==
- 1993 – Szenvedély, after the memoirs of Déryné Róza Széppataki (set design; Honvéd Ensemble, dir. Triceps)
- 2001 – Néro, szerelmem (visual design)
- 2002 – Imre Madách: The Tragedy of Man (set and visual design; opening production of the new National Theatre, dir. János Szikora)
- 2009 – Friedrich Dürrenmatt: The Physicists (set design; dir. Csaba Horváth / Forte Company)
- 2010 – Samuel Beckett: Happy Days and Waiting for Godot (set design; Trafó, dir. Csaba Horváth / Forte Company)
- 2011 – Milorad Krstić: Ruben Brandt – Group Portrait of a Collector (writer, set design; Kunsthalle, dir. Csaba Horváth / Forte Company)
- 2012 – Henrik Ibsen: Peer Gynt (set design; Csiky Gergely Theatre, dir. Csaba Horváth / Forte Company)

== Books and comics ==
- Budapest: Milorad Krstić festőművész vizuális expedíciója Budapesten. Budapest: Magyar Könyvklub, 2003 (photobook)
- Pegam & Lambergar. Ljubljana: Forum, 2004 (comics)
- Das anatomische Theater: The Simultaneous Games of 20th Century. Ljubljana: Forum; Budapest: Roczkov Studio, 2008. ISBN 978-963-06-3349-9
