= Attila Szász =

Hungarian director and writer

- Born: Attila Szász; October 23, 1972 (age 53); Szolnok, Hungary
- Occupations: Director, writer
- Years active: 2000–present
- Children: 2

Attila Szász (born October 23, 1972) is a director and writer, known for Demimonde, The Ambassador to Bern and Eternal Winter. He has two children: Vilmos Szász (born December 9, 2002, in Budapest) and Albert Szász (born May 17, 2007, in Budapest).

== Education and early career ==
Szász graduated from the University of Theatre and Film Arts in Budapest in 1996. He has worked as a film critic, a film editor and founded a distribution company. In 2002, he became editor-in-chief of Hungarian movie magazine Vox but quit the same year to become a director.

== Accolades ==
He has won Best Director awards at film festivals in Fort Lauderdale, Montreal and Newport Beach among others.
