= Ruben Brandt, Collector =

2018 Hungarian animated film directed by Milorad Krstić

- Theatrical release poster
- Hungarian: Ruben Brandt, a gyűjtő
- Directed by: Milorad Krstić
- Written by: Milorad Krstić
- Screenplay by: Milorad Krstić; Radmila Roczkov
- Produced by: Péter Miskolczi; Hermina Roczkov; Radmila Roczkov; János Kurdy-Fehér; Milorad Krstić
- Starring: Iván Kamarás; Csaba "Kor" Márton; Gabriella Hámori; Matt Devere; Henry Grant; Christian Nielson Buckholdt; Katalin Dombi; Paul Bellantoni; Geoffrey Thomas
- Edited by: Milorad Krstić; Marcell László; Danijel Daka Milošević; Lászlo Wimmer
- Music by: Tibor Cári
- Production company: Ruben Brandt LLC
- Distributed by: Mozinet
- Release date: August 9, 2018 (Locarno Film Festival)
- Running time: 94 minutes
- Country: Hungary
- Language: English

Ruben Brandt, Collector (Hungarian: Ruben Brandt, a gyűjtő) is a 2018 Hungarian independent adult animated crime thriller film directed by Milorad Krstić. It is the first feature film of the Slovenian-born director, who previously won a Silver Bear for Best Short Film at the Berlin International Film Festival in 1995. The film tells the story of a psychotherapist who enlists creative thieves to steal the paintings that are haunting his dreams.

== Plot ==
Unlikely as it seems, Ruben Brandt travels by train along with Duveneck's Whistling Boy and is attacked by Velázquez's Infanta Margarita Teresa. It is revealed that he had been having a nightmare.

Acrobatic thief Mimi steals Cleopatra's Fan from the Louvre Museum. She had been hired by crimelord Vincenzo Delangello to steal another item, le Régent Diamant, but she had a bout of kleptomania. After escaping from P.I. Kowalski (and sacrificing the fan to escape), she understands that she has psychological problems and seeks help from psychotherapist Ruben Brandt, specialized in treating artistic souls. Brandt recommends to "possess your problems to conquer them". She discovers that Brandt has panic attacks and nightmares in front of the Venus of Urbino painting, so to help him and to demonstrate the progress of the therapy, she recruits the doctor's other patients (former bodyguard Bye-Bye Joe and thieves Membrano Bruno and Fernando) to steal the painting for him - literally possessing his problem to conquer it. Brandt sees that the method works, and reveals to them that he has nightmares about twelve other paintings. The group travels the world stealing those paintings in daring heists. The press speaks of "The Collector" as the thief, since these paintings cannot be sold even on the black market so the thief is stealing those for him or herself. The insurance company puts a reward on the Collector in addition to putting Kowalski on her trail; Delangello looks for the Collector too, understanding Mimi is at least linked to the Collector. John Cooper, a former associate of Brandt's late father working with subliminals in the CIA, realizes that Brandt is the culprit (because the list of stolen paintings is exactly the list they had worked with) and calls Kowalski, but before Kowalski arrives, a mercenary, Kris Barutanski, kills Cooper, trying to find the Collector to deliver to him. Even so, Kowalski gets clues, unaware that Barutanski is hot on his heels. Examining Brandt's late father's house, Kowalski sees that the movies (with subliminals of the works; we had seen a flashback in which Gerhard had forced his son Ruben to watch the cartoon movies he liked, even though the boy would have preferred to go out for snails (maybe that's why he now has snail-shaped ice cubes) and discovers that Ruben Brandt is the Collector; he fights and kills Barutanski there. Kowalski also finds out that Gerhard Brandt is also Kowalski's father, so Kowalski and Ruben are half-brothers - Kowalski's mother had left Gerhard so that Gerhard would not also do experiments with Kowalski.

When Brandt and his accomplice try to steal a Renoir, the police are waiting for them but they escape. Dangelo's hitmen pursue them without sparing resources, but even so they escape from them too.

Mimi then has a dream in which she manages to contain her urge to steal from her but when she tries to tell Brandt, he turns into Kowalski.

There is only one painting left: Warhol's Elvis I, II, in Tokyo. Kowalski deduces it is the target, but Delangello is spying on him. Brandt's gang plans to steal the painting by faking a public performance; when Dangelo's men discover them and try to stop them, the audience believes that the performance includes the fight. They do steal the painting, that joins the other paintings in Brandt's wall.

Brandt seems like he is going to have a nightmare, but he wakes up on a quiet train, with an art book that his accomplice has dedicated to him, and Kowalski appears in the reflection of the glass (The movie had started with Frigyes Karinthy's quote "In my dream I was two cats and I was playing with each other"). We then see that the train moving forward is a single car without a locomotive, and the camera shows us a snail.

== Cast ==
- Iván Kamarás as Ruben Brandt
  - Liam Aaron Grant as Young Ruben Brandt
- Csaba "Kor" Márton as Mike Kowalski
- Gabriella Hámori as Mimi
- Matt Devere as Bye-Bye Joe
- Henry Grant as Membrano Bruno, Van Gogh's Postman and Renoir
- Christian Nielson Buckholdt as Fernando
- Katalin Dombi as Marina
- Paul Bellantoni as John Cooper
- Luca Bercovici as Kris Barutanski
- Butch Engle as Vincenzo Delangello
- Irén Bordán as Eva Kowalski
- Scott Hoke as Professor Walden
- Iván Hegedus as Boris
- Péter Linka as George
- Virginia Proud as Margaret
- Dave Fennoy as Garreth Graham
- Geoffrey Thomas as Gerhard Brandt

== Paintings depicted in the movie ==
The film depicts the following thirteen paintings that haunted Ruben Brandt:

- Frédéric Bazille – Portrait of Renoir (1867)
- Sandro Botticelli – The Birth of Venus (c. 1486)
- Hans Holbein the Younger – Portrait of Antoine, Prince of Lorraine (c.1543)
- Frank Duveneck – Whistling Boy (1872)
- Paul Gauguin – Woman Holding A Fruit (1893)
- Vincent van Gogh – Portrait of the Postman Joseph Roulin (1888)
- Edward Hopper – Nighthawks (1942)
- René Magritte – The Treachery of Images (1929)
- Édouard Manet – Olympia (1863)
- Pablo Picasso – Woman with book (1932)
- Tiziano Vecellio – Venus of Urbino (1538)
- Diego Velázquez – Infanta Margarita Teresa in a Blue Dress (1659)
- Andy Warhol – Elvis l, ll (1964)

== Reception ==
On review aggregator website Rotten Tomatoes, the film has an 82% score based on 66 reviews, with an average of 7/10. The site's critical consensus reads, "Ruben Brandt, Collector is flawed from a storytelling standpoint, but the eye-catching animation is more than enough to make this offbeat thriller well worth watching."

== =Awards and accolades ==
In 2018, the film received Annie Awards nominations in two categories, Best Animated Independent Feature and Editorial in an Animated Feature Production. The film received awards at the following film festivals:

- Bucharest International Animation Film Festival (Anim'est) (2018): Best Feature Film
- Seville European Film Festival (2018): Best Screenplay Award; Art Cinema Award
- Trieste Film Festival (2019): Sky Arte Award
- Brussels International Animation Film Festival (2019): BeTV Award for Best Animated Feature of the Official Selection
- World Festival of Animated Film – Animafest Zagreb (2019): Grand Prix, Feature Film
