= Ferenc Mikulás =

Hungarian animator

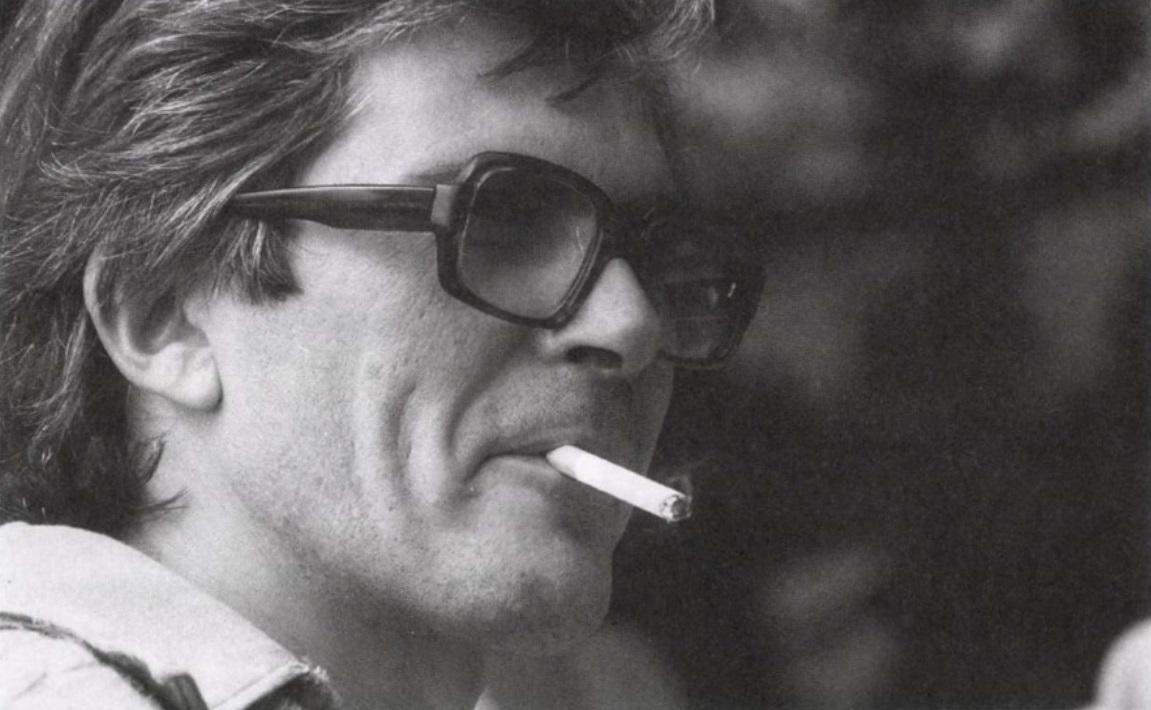
Image

Ferenc Mikulás (born 17 August 1940, in Dunapataj) is a figure in the Hungarian animation film culture. He is the founder and director of the animation film studio Kecskemétfilm Kft., and the director of Kecskemét Animation Film Festival (KAFF).

== Biography ==
He was born on 17 August 1940. He was expelled from high school in the spring of 1957, due to his participation in the Hungarian Revolution of 1956. In the following years, he was working as a geodesist. He wrote screenplays and directed short features. From 1970, he began to work on animation films in Pannonia Film Studio.

From 1 June 1971, he is the director of Kecskemét Animation Film Studio, producer of several animation films and series (Hungarian Folk Tales, Water Spider Wonder Spider, etc.). From 1993 he is the director of Kecskeméti Animation Film Festival. From 1997 to 2000, he has been a member of ASIFA's directors' board. He has been the member of the jury of several international animation film festivals, including Chiavari, Seoul, Ankara, and Beijing.

== Awards ==
- 1995: Golden Cross of the Hungarian Republic
- 2004: Chiavari Animation Film Festival: the Max Massimino Garnier Award of the Italian Film Association
- 2008: Balázs Béla Award (Hungarian film award)
- 2008: Bács-Kiskun county's Prima award
