= Kaláka =

Hungarian band

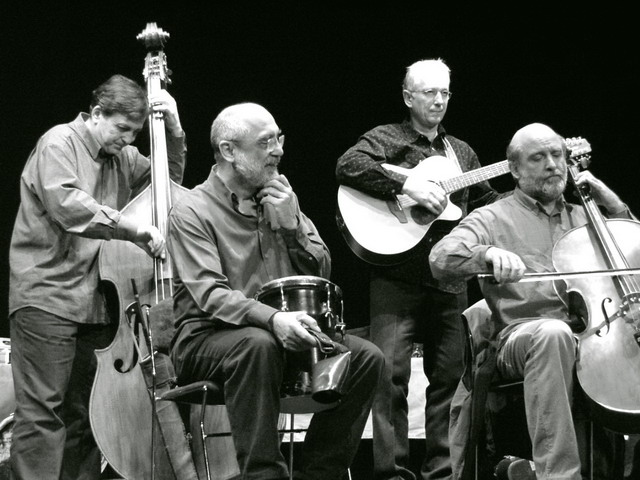

Background information
- Origin: Budapest, Hungary
- Genres: Folk; jazz; blues
- Years active: 1969–present
- Labels: Hungaroton; Gryllus
- Members: Gábor Becze; Dániel Gryllus; Vilmos Gryllus; Balázs Radványi
- Past members: István Mikó; Péter Dabasi; Péter Huzella
- Website: kalaka.hu

Kaláka is a folk music group, formed in Budapest, Hungary on November 26, 1969, that primarily performs poetry by Hungarian and (in translation) world authors set to music of their own composition, played on classical and folk instruments. The founding members are Dániel Gryllus, Vilmos Gryllus, István Mikó and Balázs Radványi. Mikó was later replaced by Péter Dabasi, who in turn was replaced by Péter Huzella and then by Gábor Becze. Tamás Kobzos Kiss was also a member of the band for a short time. They have been in their current lineup since 1996.

Since 1980 they have organized the Kaláka Folk Festival every summer. The festival was originally held in the Castle of Diósgyőr, Miskolc; since 2012 it has been held in the town of Eger.

The word kaláka refers in some Hungarian dialects to an old village tradition of collaborative work and mutual aid.

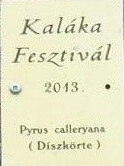
The Festival's plaque in the Archbishop's Garden, Eger

== Members ==
- Gábor Becze: double bass, guitar
- Dániel Gryllus: flute, zither, pan flute, clarinet, tárogató, bagpipe
- Vilmos Gryllus: cello, guitar, charango, lute, Jew's harp
- Balázs Radványi: mandolin, 12-string guitar, ukulele, cuatro, viola, kalimba

== Works ==
Music and poetry

Kaláka has set to music works by scores of Hungarian and foreign poets, including János Arany, Sándor Petőfi, Mihály Babits, Endre Ady, Sándor Weöres, Miklós Radnóti, Dezső Kosztolányi, Sándor Kányádi, Lőrinc Szabó, Attila József, Ágnes Nemes Nagy, Charles Sirato, Christian Morgenstern, Thorbjørn Egner, Robert Burns, Edgar Allan Poe, Jacques Hamelink, H. H. ter Balkt, François Villon, Nicolás Guillén, and Sergei Yesenin and many others. In some cases (Arany, Kányádi, Kosztolányi, Sirato, Yesenin, Villon) entire albums have been devoted to a single poet. Another early release was a collaboration with Dutch cabaret performer Henk Batenburgh, Oda s vissza - Over en weer, of which one side (of the original LP record) contained Dutch poems in Hungarian translation and the other (sung by Batenburgh) contained Hungarian poems in Dutch translation.

Kaláka have released over 1300 songs and 30 albums in the over 55 years since they were founded, in addition to solo work by the band members.

Soundtracks

They composed the theme for the cartoon series Hungarian Folk Tales.

Concerts and tours

They often give concerts for children. All the musicians learned by the Kodály method in primary school and utilize what they learnt there about music education.

Kaláka have toured abroad in many countries, including: Austria, Argentina, Belgium, Bosnia, Brazil, Bulgaria, Canada, Chile, the Republic of China, Colombia, Croatia, the Czech Republic, Denmark, Estonia, Finland, France, Germany, Italy, Japan, the Netherlands, Norway, Poland, Portugal, Romania, Slovakia, Slovenia, the Soviet Union, Sweden, Switzerland, Ukraine, the United States, Venezuela, Yugoslavia, and South Korea.

== Awards ==
Kaláka has received numerous awards, among them many of Hungary's highest cultural and artistic awards, including the Kossuth Prize (twice, in 2000 and 2020) and the Prima Primissima Prize (in 2004).

== Partial discography ==
- Kaláka (1977)
- Az én koromban (1981)
- A fekete ember (1984)
- Oda s vissza - Over en weer (with Henk Batenburgh) (1984)
- A pelikán (1985)
- Szabad-e bejönni ide betlehemmel? (1987)
- Az én szívemben boldogok a tárgyak (1988)
- Villon – Kaláka (1988)
- Boldog szomorú dal (1989)
- Ukulele (1993)
- Kaláka 25 (1994)
- Hol a nadrágom? (1995)
- Bőrönd Ödön (1996)
- Varázsvirágok (1998)
- Hajnali rigók (1998)
- Nálatok laknak-e állatok? (1998)
- Kaláka 30 (1999)
- Egyetemi Színpad '76 (2002)
- Csak az egészség meglegyen (2003)
- Kaláka – Kányádi (2004)
- Kaláka – Kosztolányi (2005)
- Karácsonyi Kaláka (2005)
- Madáretető (2006)
- Kaláka – Arany János (2007)
- Ukulele – Kaláka verseskönyv gyerekeknek (2007)
- Hangol már a zenekar (2017)
- Békabúcsúztató (2019)
- fontosnak vélt vinnivalóim - 42. Kaláka Fesztivál Eger (2022)
- Tengerecki Pál (2025)
- Kupaktanács (2026)

== Books ==
- Horváth, Bence; Lettner, Krisztina; Takács, József M. (2010). A Kaláka (első) 40 éve (Kaláka – The First 40 Years). Cartaphilus Publishing Ltd. ISBN 9789632661438.
