= Budin Eyalet =

1541–1686 Ottoman province in Hungary and Serbia

Province of Budin (Buda) ایالت بودین (Ottoman Turkish) Budai vilajet (Hungarian) Budimski pašaluk (Serbo-Croatian)
- Eyalet of Ottoman Empire
- 1541–1686
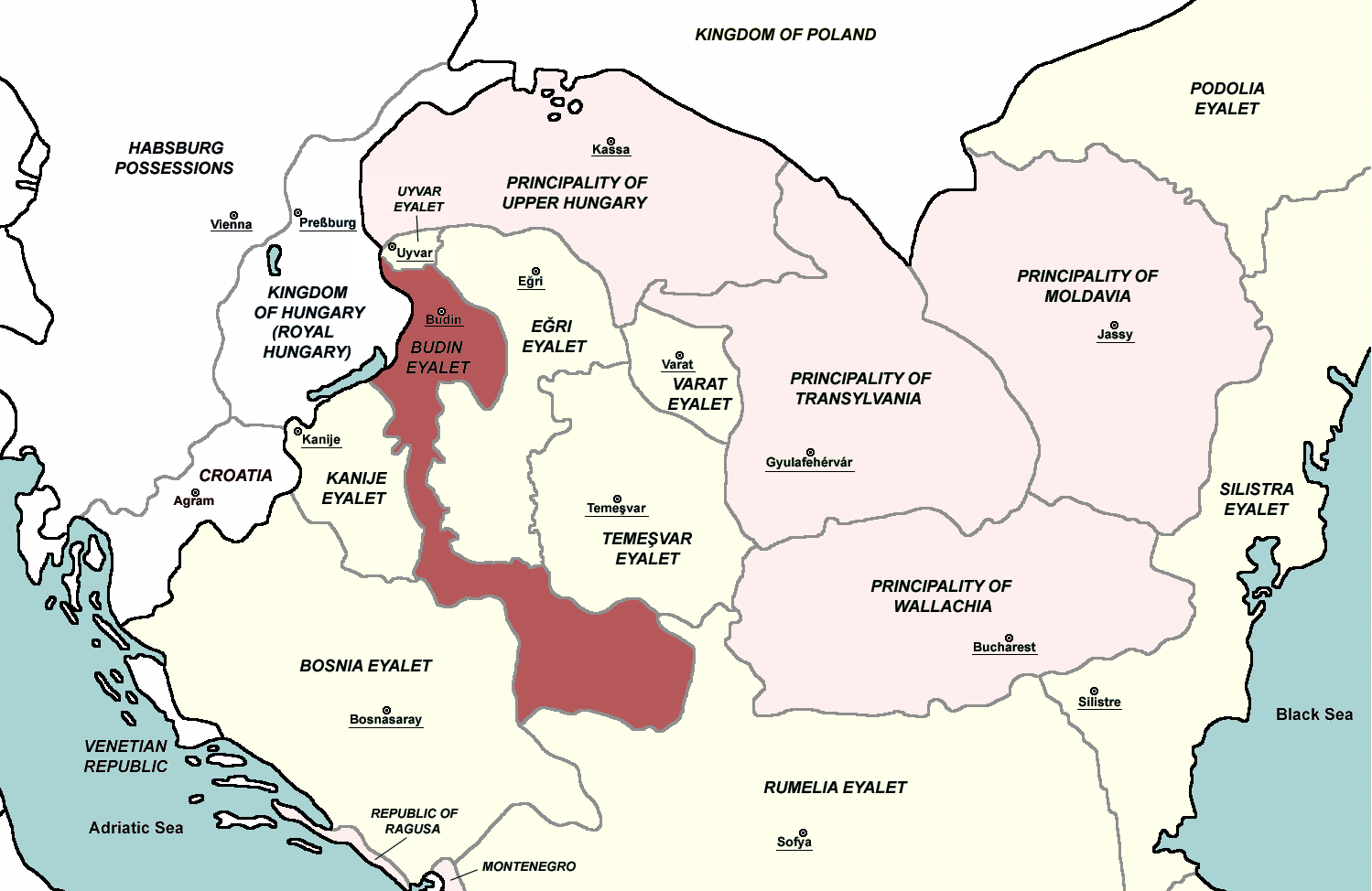
- The Budin Eyalet in 1683
- Capital: Budin (Hungarian: Buda)
- Area
  - Coordinates: 47°28′N 19°03′E
  - Type: Eyalet
- History
  - Siege of Buda: 1541
  - Battle of Buda: 1686
Preceded by
Kingdom of Hungary in the Middle Ages
Rumelia Eyalet
Succeeded by
Habsburg Monarchy
Temeşvar Eyalet
Kanije Eyalet
Eğri Eyalet
- Today part of: Slovakia; Hungary; Croatia; Serbia

Budin Eyalet (also known as Province of Budin/Buda or Pashalik of Budin/Buda, Ottoman Turkish: ایالت بودین, romanized: Eyālet-i Budin) was an administrative territorial entity of the Ottoman Empire in Central Europe and the Balkans. It was formed on the territories that Ottoman Empire conquered from the medieval Kingdom of Hungary and Serbian Despotate. The capital of the Budin Province was Budin (Hungarian: Buda).

Population of the province was ethnically and religiously diverse and included Hungarians, Croats, Serbs, Slovaks, Muslims of various ethnic origins (living mainly in the cities) and others (Jews, Romani, etc.). The city of Buda itself became majority Muslim during the seventeenth century, largely through the immigration of Balkan Muslims.

== History ==
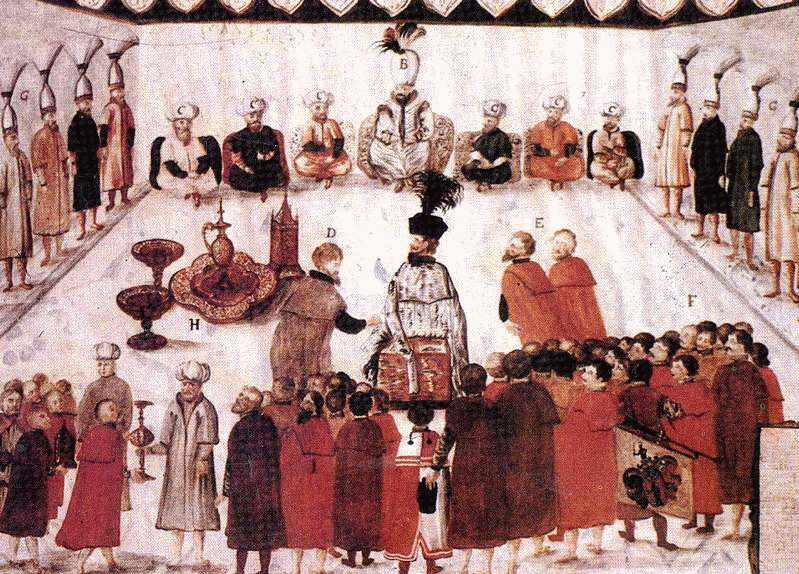
The pasha of Budin receiving the envoy of the Ottoman Sultan

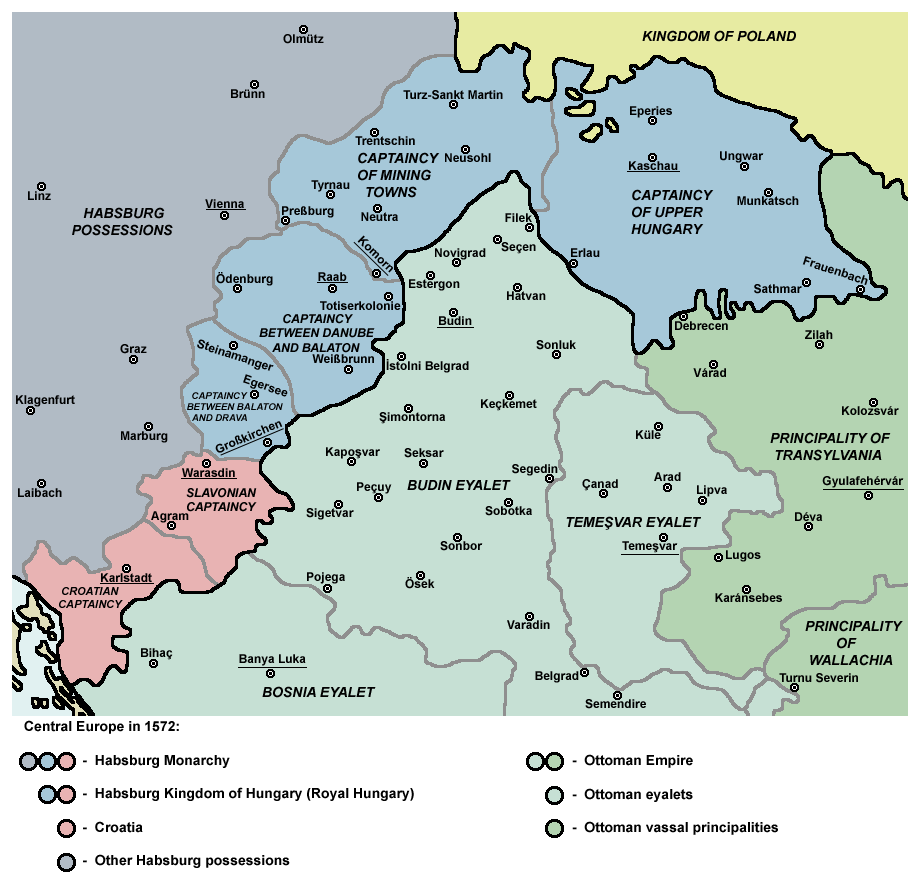
The northern part of the Budin Eyalet in 1572

In the 16th century the Ottoman Empire had conquered the southern "line of fortresses" (végvár) of the Kingdom of Hungary. After the Battle of Mohács where the Kingdom of Hungary was heavily defeated, and the turmoil caused by the defeat, the influence was spread on the middle part of the Kingdom of Hungary. While Ottoman troops invaded Buda in 1526 and 1529, Suleyman I used the Buda area as a territory of the allied kingdom and did not annex it fully to the Empire.

In 1541, Suleyman decided to consolidate the conquered Buda area and to set it up as an organic part of the Empire. He drove away the Austrian commander Wilhelm von Roggendorf, besieging the city, and on 29 August 1541 he took control of the city, together with the city on the other side of the Danube, Pest. He immediately organised the first Central European eyalet (province) with its capital in Buda (Budin in Turkish).

The same year, several other cities fell under Ottoman rule: Szeged, Kalocsa and Szabadka (Serbian: Subotica). In the years 1543–44, the Ottomans conquered the fortresses of Nógrád, Vác, Fehérvár, Pécs and Siklós which were embedded into the new eyalet.

In 1552 the eyalet was expanded with new territories in the North, and the new Eyalet of Temeşvar was established. Military control of the surrounding areas was driven from Budin.

The following year, the advance of the Ottomans slowed down and the territory of the Budin vilajet did not change until the ending of the Fifteen Years War and the Peace of Zsitvatorok, where the Ottomans lost territories North of Nógrád. However Eğri and Kanije were captured during these wars and were shortly managed as sanjaks in this province.

Between 1566–1578, the governorship of Budin was held by Sokollu Mustafa Pasha. He was the twelfth and most notable beylerybey of the province. His tenure of twelve years was unprecedented and unsurpassed and saw numerous construction projects particularly in the provincial capital of Budin. It marked a significant transformation of the capital of the medieval Hungarian kingdom into an Ottoman provincial stronghold at the frontier between civilizations.

By the 1570s the financial situation of the eyalet improved, albeit temporarily, as for the first time since its creation tax revenues surpassed expenditures.

The territory of the eyalet was significantly reduced in size with the establishment of the eyalets of Eğri (1596) and Kanije (1600). Nevertheless, it remained the foremost Ottoman province in Central Europe, owing to the strategic importance of Budin as a major port on the Danube.

In the 17th century Kara Mustafa Pasha conquered more areas from the Habsburg Kingdom of Hungary and its vassal, the Principality of Transylvania, but did not succeed in conquering Vienna in 1683. This failed attempt heralded the gradual decline of Ottoman power in Europe. On 2 September 1686 Budin was captured by the troops of the Holy League.

== Military ==
Military clashes between the Habsburgs and the Ottomans were inevitable. They formed a border with one another, and although the European Eyalet had been established, there was a strong military presence in Buda.

The number of the troops in the province at this time is difficult to estimate. There are documents to show 10,200 soldiers in the fortresses in 1546, and 12,451 soldiers in 1568. Auxiliary troops called sipahi were also present. The cost of maintaining this large force put pressure on the budget of the province. In 1552, for example, the Porte sent 440,000 gold coins to Budin to provision the army.

If the sultan or the beylerbey was not present, then the post of general commander was taken by the pashas of Budin.

== Fortresses ==
The Ottoman Empire put all efforts to strengthen the stronghold in Budin. They built several rings of defence around Budin and defended roads for supplies to Vienna, as their aim was to crush the capital of the Habsburgs, which they did not succeed.

The most important fortresses around Budin were Esztergom, Székesfehérvár, and also less important Vác and Visegrád. To the south, the most relevant fortress was Szigetvár.

=== Budin ===
In the 145 years Ottoman era, the city of Budin was not converted to the "Italian" type of defensive fortress, which was in the fashion at that time. The old fortress was enlarged by the "Víziváros" walls and a small stronghold was built on the Gellért hill.

The Budin Castle was already standing on a medieval castle, with more or less same walls as per now. Various towers were built by Ottomans i.e. "Murad pasha tower" (Turkish: Murat paşa kulesi) between 1650 and 1653. The walls were enlarged in Gellért hill, in Rózsadomb, Nap-hegy and on the side of the Danube. The main castle was also walled inside, where they have made small openings so that the sentry could move easily.

== Administrative divisions ==
After 1541, province included following sanjaks:

1. Sanjak of Budin (Buda)
2. Sanjak of Semendire (Smederevo)
3. Sanjak of İzvornik (Zvornik)
4. Sanjak of Vulçetrin (Vushtrri)
5. Sanjak of Pojega (Požega)
6. Sanjak of Mohaç (Mohács)
7. Sanjak of İstolni Belgrad (Székesfehérvár)
8. Sanjak of Segedin (Szeged)
9. Sanjak of Sirem (Syrmia)
10. Sanjak of Kopan (Koppany)
11. Sanjak of Şikloş (Siklos)
12. Sanjak of Peçuy (Pécs)
13. Sanjak of Vidin
14. Sanjak of Alacahisar (Kruševac)
15. Sanjak of Çanad (Cenad)
16. Sanjak of Beçkerek (Zrenjanin)
17. Sanjak of Hipovo

In about 1566, province included following sanjaks:

1. Sanjak of Budin (Buda)
2. Sanjak of Semendire (Smederevo)
3. Sanjak of Pojega (Požega)
4. Sanjak of Mıhaç (Mohács)
5. Sanjak of İstolni Belgrad (Székesfehérvár)
6. Sanjak of Segedin (Szeged)
7. Sanjak of Sirem (Syrmia)
8. Sanjak of Baboça (Babocsa)
9. Sanjak of Zigetvar (Szigetvar)
10. Sanjak of Peçuy (Pécs)
11. Sanjak of Estergon (Esztergom)
12. Sanjak of Hatvan
13. Sanjak of Filek (Filakovo)
14. Sanjak of Seçen (Szécsény)
15. Sanjak of Sonluk (Szolnok)
16. Sanjak of Şimontorna (Simontornya)
17. Sanjak of Kopan (Koppány)
18. Sanjak of Şikloş (Siklós)
19. Sanjak of Sekçay (Szekszárd)
20. Sanjak of Novigrad (Nograd)
21. Sanjak of Pespirim (Veszprém)

In about 1600, province included following sanjaks:

1. Sanjak of Semendire (Smederevo)
2. Sanjak of Sirem (Syrmia)
3. Sanjak of Ráckeve
4. Sanjak of Kopan (Koppány)
5. Sanjak of İstolni Belgrad (Székesfehérvár)
6. Sanjak of Mıhaç (Mohács)
7. Sanjak of Şikloş (Siklós)
8. Sanjak of Seçuy

In 1610, province included following sanjaks:

1. Sanjak of Budin (Buda)
2. Sanjak of Sirem (Syrmia)
3. Sanjak of Ráckeve
4. Sanjak of Kopan (Koppány)
5. Sanjak of İstolni Belgrad (Székesfehérvár)
6. Sanjak of Mıhaç (Mohács)

Sanjaks of the Budin Eyalet, according to Evliya Çelebi in the 17th century:

1. Sanjak of Budin (Bude)
2. Sanjak of Segedin (Segdin)
3. Sanjak of Sonluk
4. Sanjak of Hatvan (Hetwan)
5. Sanjak of Sihún
6. Sanjak of Germat (Germán)
7. Sanjak of Filek
8. Sanjak of Eğri (Erla, German: Erlau)

Before the end of Ottoman administration (i.e. before 1699), province included following sanjaks:

1. Sanjak of Budin (Buda)
2. Sanjak of Sirem (Syrmia)
3. Sanjak of Semendire (Smederevo)
4. Sanjak of Sekçay (Szekszárd)
5. Sanjak of Şimontorna (Simontornya)
6. Sanjak of İstolni Belgrad (Székesfehérvár)
7. Sanjak of Estergon (Esztergom)
8. Sanjak of Mohaç (Mohács)
9. Sanjak of Peçuy (Pécs)

== See also ==
- Ottoman Hungary
- Sokollu Mustafa Pasha
- Transformation of the Ottoman Empire § Hungary - on the Ottoman defensive system in Hungary.
- History of Ottoman Serbia
- Ottoman Croatia
- Ottoman Kosovo
- Ottoman Romania
