= Kanije Eyalet =

Administrative division of the Ottoman Empire from 1600 to 1690

Kanije Eyalet ایالت قنیژه (Ottoman Turkish) Kanizsai ejálet (Hungarian) Kaniški ejalet (Croatian)
- Eyalet of the Ottoman Empire
- 1600–1690
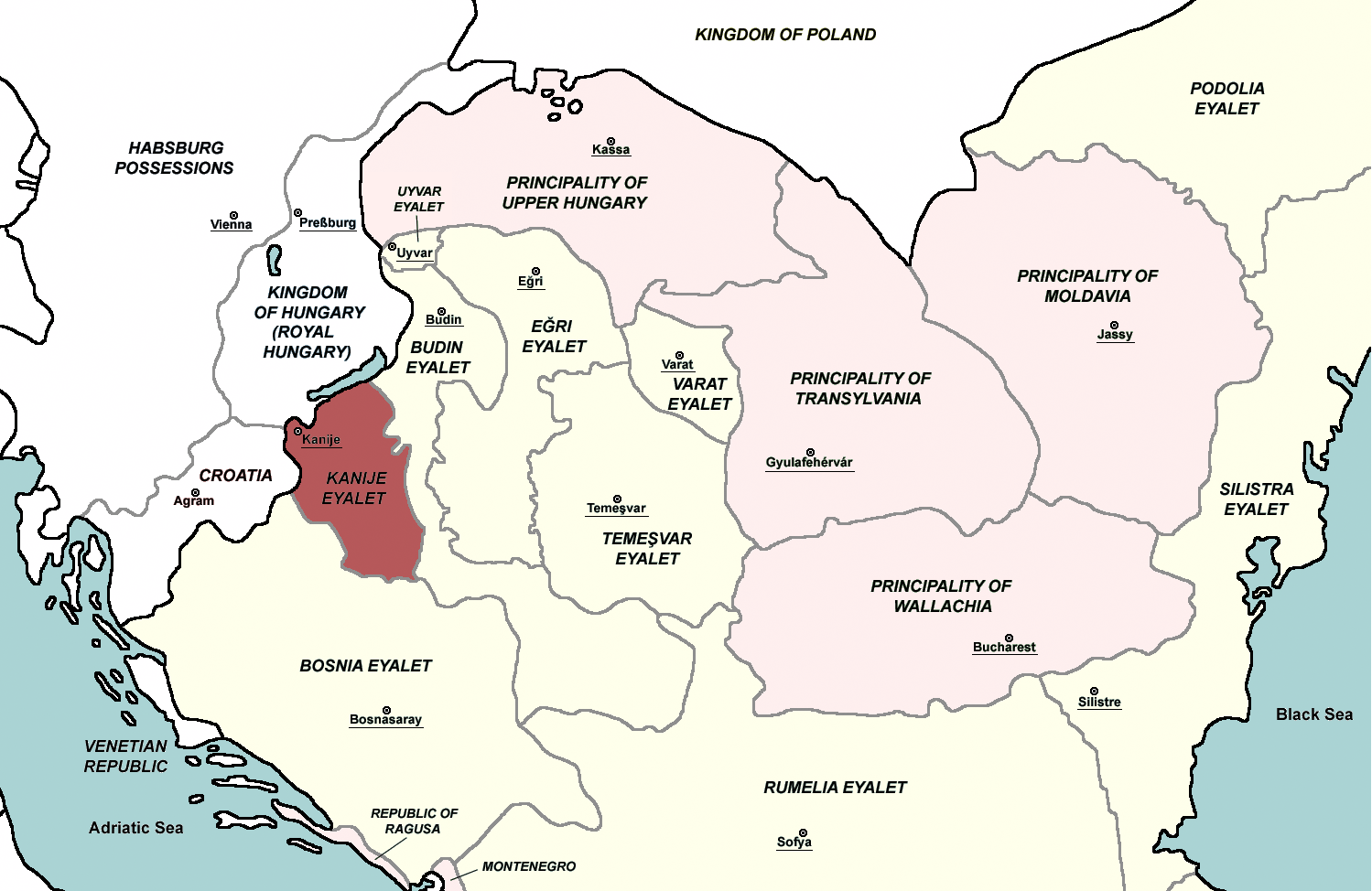
- The Kanije Eyalet in 1683
- Capital: Kanije (Hungarian: Kanizsa, modern Nagykanizsa)
- Area
  - Coordinates: 46°27′N 16°59′E
- History
  - Established: 1600
  - Disestablished: 1690
Preceded by	Succeeded by
Habsburg Monarchy; Zigetvar Eyalet	Habsburg Monarchy
- Today part of: Croatia; Hungary

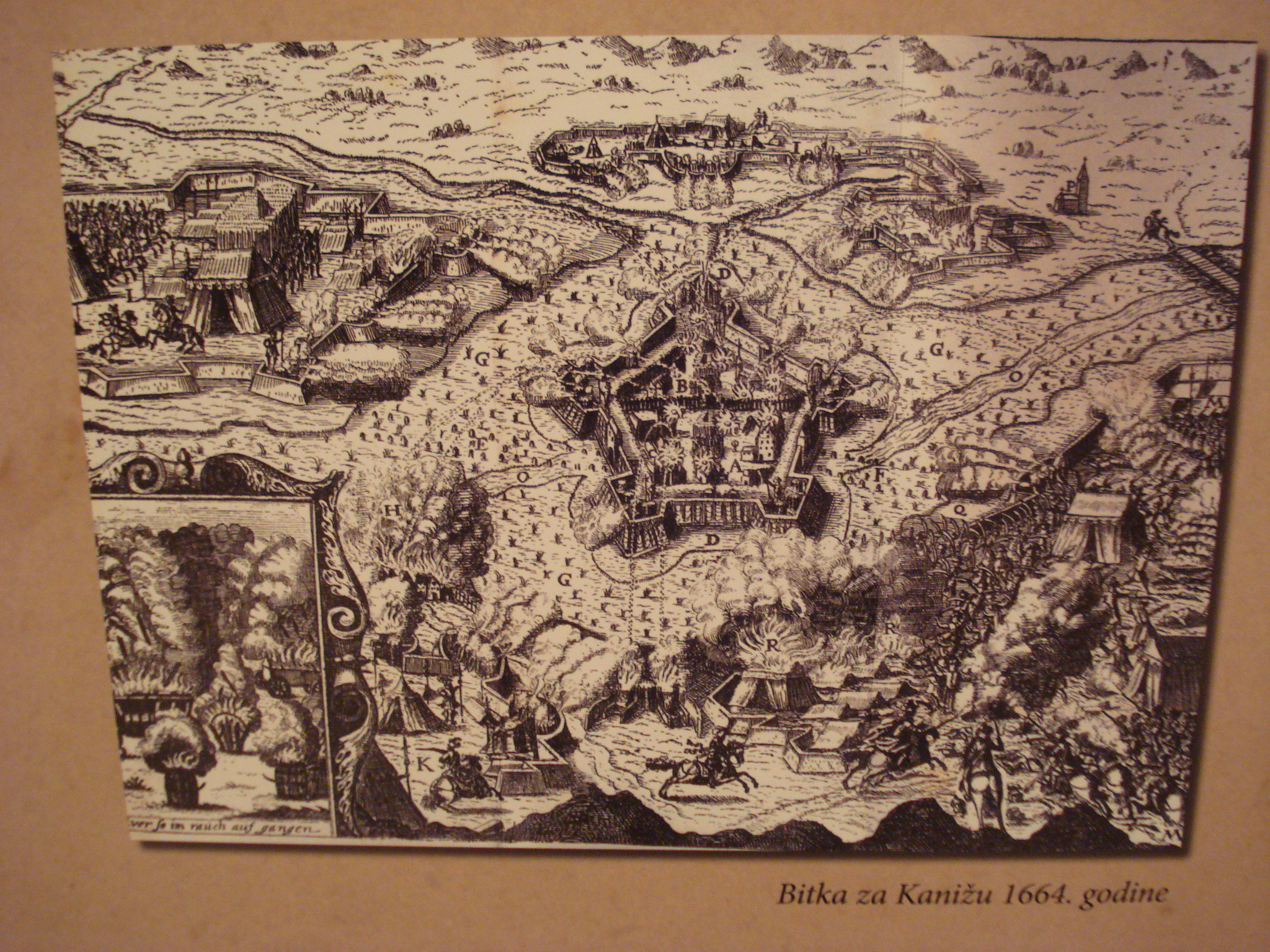
Contemporary depiction of the unsuccessful siege of Kanizsa in May 1664, undertaken by Christian forces led by Nikola VII Zrinski, Ban (Viceroy) of Croatia, General Hohenlohe-Neuenstein and General Peter Strozzi

The Kanije Eyalet (Ottoman Turkish: ایالت قنیژه; Eyālet-i Ḳanije) was an administrative territorial entity of the Ottoman Empire formed in 1600 and existing until the 1699 Treaty of Karlowitz. It included parts of present-day Hungary and Croatia

== History ==
The province of Kanije was established in 1600 after the town of Kanije was captured from Habsburgs. This newly conquered area was joined with territory of Zigetvar Province, which was formed in 1596 from some sanjaks of Budin Province (which had been expanded as a result of the Ottoman territorial gains during the Long War) and Bosnia Province. The Kanije Eyalet existed until the capture of Kanije by Habsburg Monarchy in 1690. It was formally ceded to Habsburg Monarchy by the Treaty of Karlowitz in 1699.

== Administrative divisions ==
In 1600, the Kanije Eyalet comprised the:
- Sanjak of Kanije
- Sanjak of İstolni Belgrad (Székesfehérvár),
- Sanjak of Peçuy (Pécs), and
- Sanjak of Pojega (Požega)
The sanjaks of Kanije Eyalet in the 17th century:
1. Sanjak of Kanije
2. Sanjak of Siget
3. Sanjak of Kopan (Törökkoppány)
4. Sanjak of Valiova (Valpovo)
5. Sanjak of Sokolofja (Siklós)
Later in the 17th century, it expanded to include the:
- Sanjak of Kanije
- Sanjak of Zigetvar (Szigetvár),
- Sanjak of Kopan (Törökkoppány),
- Sanjak of Valpuva (Valpovo),
- Sanjak of Siklos (Siklós),
- Sanjak of Nadaj (Mecseknádasd), and
- Sanjak of Peçuy (Pécs)
- Sanjak of Pojega

== See also ==
- Long War (Ottoman wars)
- Ottoman Hungary
- Ottoman Croatia
