= Ottoman Hungary =

Region of the Ottoman Empire (1541–1699)

Ottoman Hungary Török hódoltság (Hungarian)
- 1541–1699
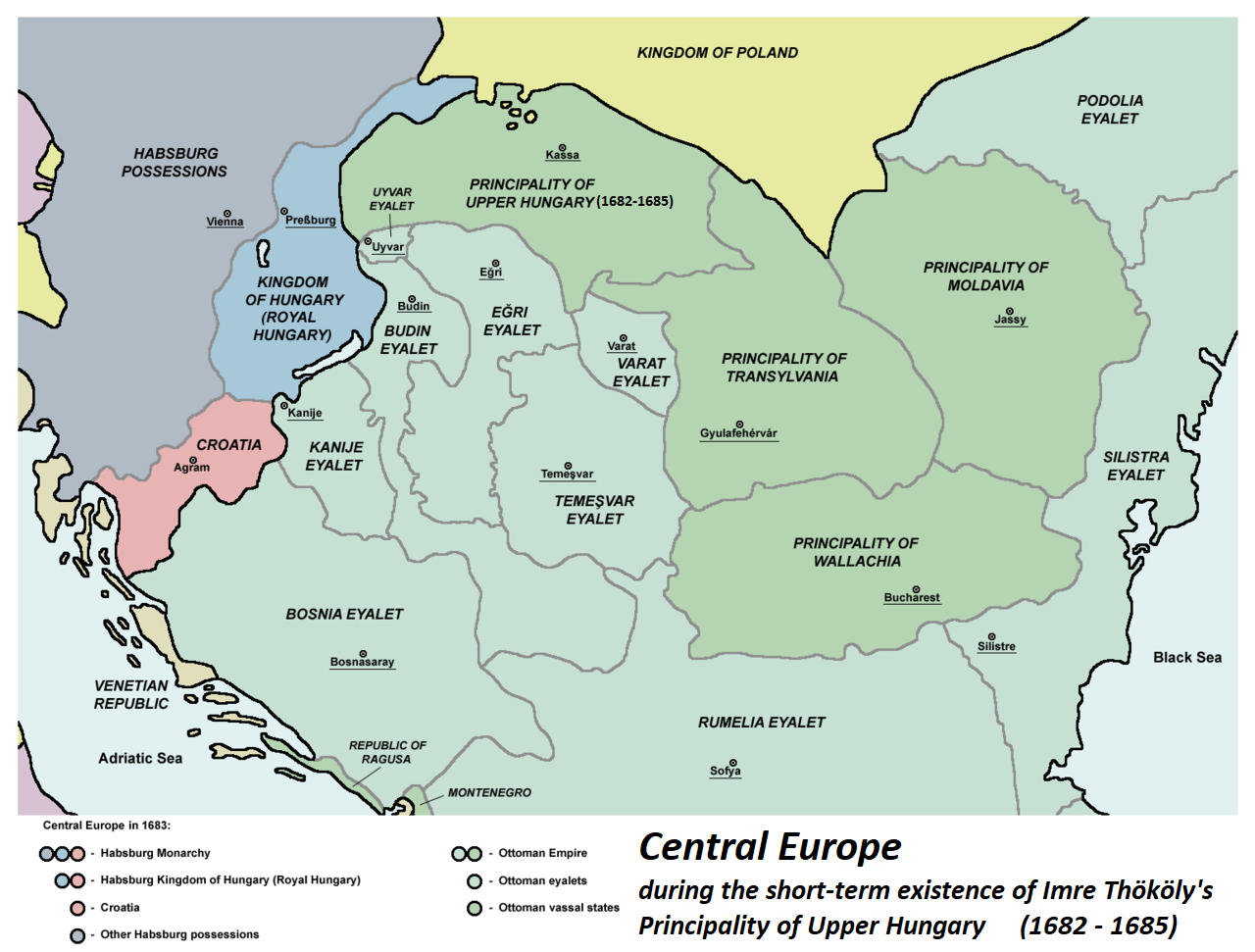
- Ottoman rule on Hungary at its peak in 1683, including the Budin, Egri, Kanije, Temesvar, Uyvar, and Varat eyalets. The semi-independent Principality of Transylvania was an Ottoman vassal state for the majority of the 16th and 17th centuries, the short lived Imre Thököly's Principality of Upper Hungary also briefly became an Ottoman vassal state due to an anti-Habsburg uprising between 1682 and 1685.
- Common languages: Hungarian
- Religion: Sunni Islam (official); Christianity; Protestantism (majority); Roman Catholicism; Eastern Orthodoxy
- Demonym: Hungarian

Government
- Beylerbey, Pasha, Agha, Dey

History
  - Ottoman occupation of Buda: 1541
  - Recapture of Buda: 1686
  - Treaty of Karlowitz: 1699
- Today part of: Hungary, Croatia, Serbia, Slovakia, Romania

Ottoman Hungary (Hungarian: Török hódoltság, lit. 'Turkish subjugation') encompassed the parts of the Kingdom of Hungary which were under the rule of the Ottoman Empire between the occupation of Buda in 1541 and the Treaty of Karlowitz in 1699. For most of its duration, Ottoman Hungary covered Southern Transdanubia and almost the entire region of the Great Hungarian Plain.

Ottoman Hungary was divided for administrative purposes into eyalets (further divided into sanjaks) and principalities (vassals). Ownership of much of the land was distributed to Ottoman soldiers and officials with the remaining territory being retained by the Ottoman state. As a border territory, much of Ottoman Hungary was heavily fortified with troop garrisons. Remaining economically under-developed, it became a drain on Ottoman resources. During the centuries long three-way Hungarian–Habsburg–Ottoman wars the Hungarian population was highly decimated.

In 1686, Buda was recaptured from the Ottomans, and in 1687, after the Second Battle of Mohács, the Hungarian parliament recognized that the inheritance of the Hungarian crown had passed to the Habsburgs. The imperial armies pushed the Turks out of Hungary relatively quickly and occupied Transylvania as well. Following the defeat of the Ottomans in the Great Turkish War, the Ottomans recognized the loss of the Ottoman Hungary by the Treaty of Karlowitz in 1699. The remaining Ottoman occupied territories (that encompassed the southern border regions of the Kingdom of Hungary), Temeşvar Eyalet, Syrmia and Belgrade, were reconquered by the Habsburgs during the Austro-Turkish War between 1716 and 1718, the cession of these regions was acknowledged by signing of the Treaty of Passarowitz in 1718.

== Background ==
Since the 1360s, Hungary had been confronted with the Ottoman Empire. The Kingdom of Hungary led several crusades, and campaigns and carried out several defensive operations and sieges against the Ottomans. Hungary bore the brunt of the Ottoman wars in Europe during the 15th century and successfully halted the Ottoman advance. From 1490, after the death of King Matthias of Hungary, royal power declined in Hungary, and the Black Army of Hungary was disbanded. In contrast, by the 16th century, the power of the Ottoman Empire had gradually increased, along with the territory they controlled in the Balkans. The Kingdom of Hungary was further weakened by the peasants revolt led by György Dózsa in 1514, and during the reign of Louis II of Hungary (1516–1526), internal dissension divided the nobility.

In 1521, Hungary was invaded by Sultan Suleiman the Magnificent. Hungary was referred to as Macaristan in Ottoman Turkish (which remains the Turkish name for Hungary). The key border fortress of Belgrade, considered the southern gate of the Kingdom of Hungary, was captured by the Ottomans following the Third Siege of Belgrade. The Sultan launched an attack against the Kingdom of Hungary, defeating its smaller army at the Battle of Mohács in 1526, during which King Louis II of Hungary died.

After the death of the Hungarian king, both the Austrian Habsburg family and the Hungarian noble Zápolya family claimed the whole kingdom. King John I of Hungary ruled the Eastern Hungarian Kingdom, and the Habsburgs ruled the western part of the Kingdom of Hungary. During this time, the Habsburgs made attempts to unite all of the kingdom under their rule, but the Ottoman Empire prevented that by supporting the Eastern Hungarian Kingdom. King John I died in 1540, the Habsburg forces besieged Buda, the Hungarian capital, in 1541. Sultan Suleiman led a relief force and defeated the Habsburgs, the Ottomans captured the city during the Siege of Buda and the southern and central areas of the kingdom were absorbed into the Ottoman Empire, therefore Hungary was divided into three parts. The north-western rim of the Hungarian kingdom remained unconquered and recognised members of the House of Habsburg as Kings of Hungary, giving it the name "Royal Hungary". The Eastern Hungarian Kingdom is the predecessor of the Principality of Transylvania, which was established by the Treaty of Speyer in 1570 and the Eastern Hungarian King became the first Prince of Transylvania. The Principality of Transylvania was a semi-independent state, and a vassal state of the Ottoman Empire, it continued to be part of the Kingdom of Hungary in the sense of public law, John Sigismund's possessions belonged to the Holy Crown of Hungary, and was a symbol of the survival of Hungarian statehood. The boundary between the three territories thereupon became the frontline in the Ottoman–Habsburg wars over the next 150 years.

Ottoman Campaigns of John Hunyadi, 1440–1456

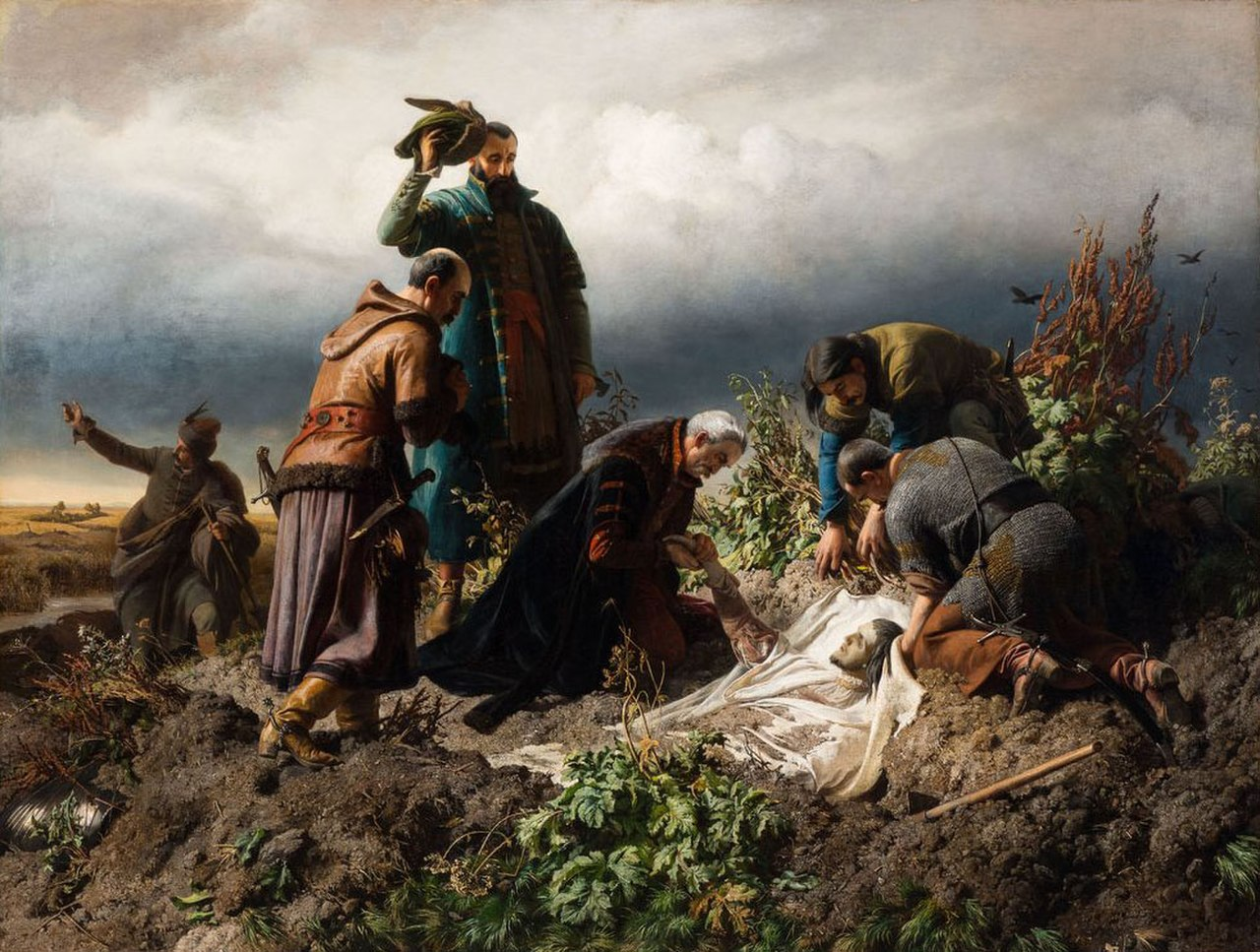
The discovery of the body of King Louis II after the Battle of Mohács in 1526. The 20-year-old king died when he fell backwards off his horse while trying to ride up a steep ravine of the Csele stream. (Bertalan Székely, 1860)

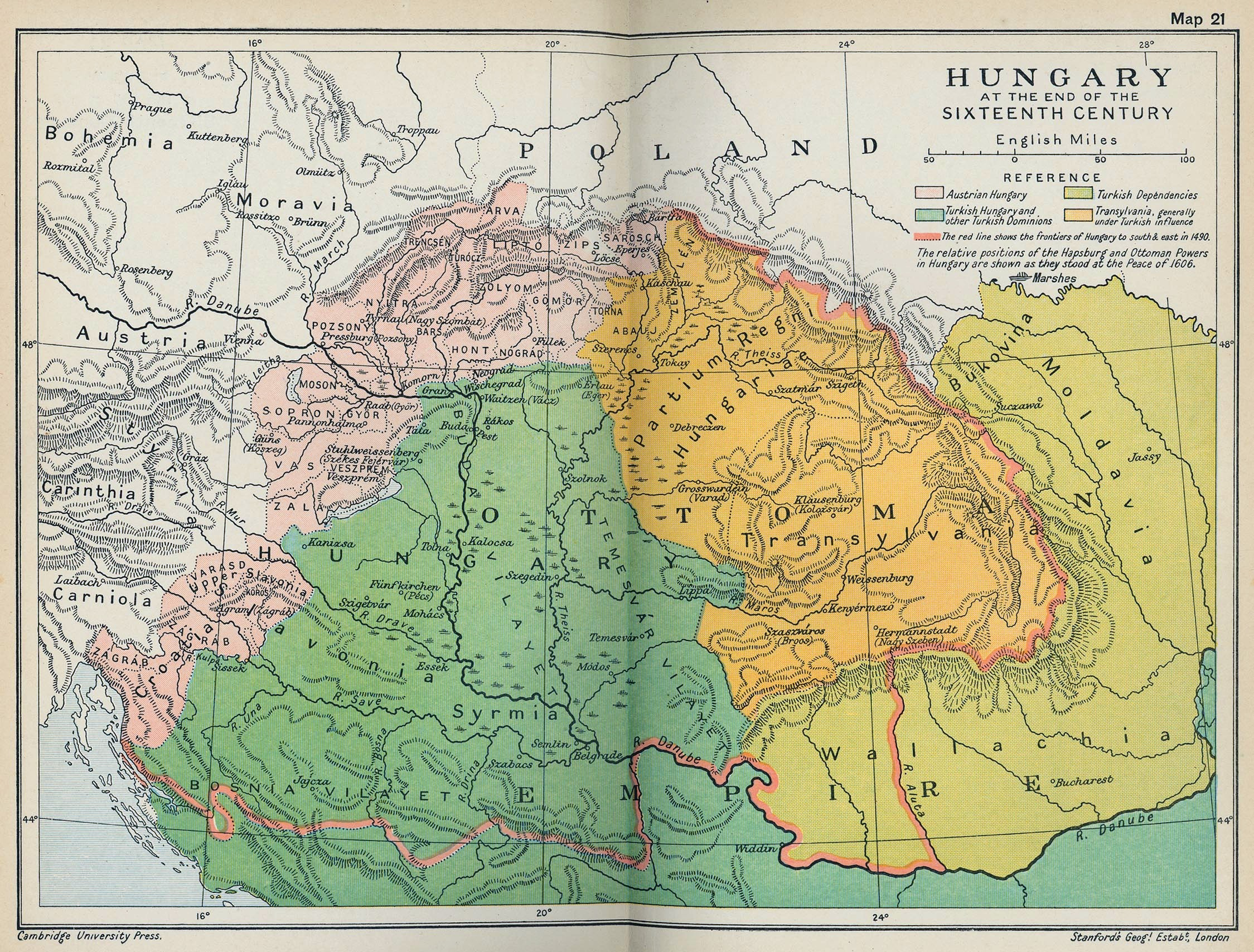
Hungary at the end of 16th century. The red line shows the southern and eastern frontiers of Hungary in 1490. By the occupation of Buda in 1541, Hungary was divided into three parts: pink: Royal Hungary, green: Ottoman Hungary, yellow: Principality of Transylvania

== History ==
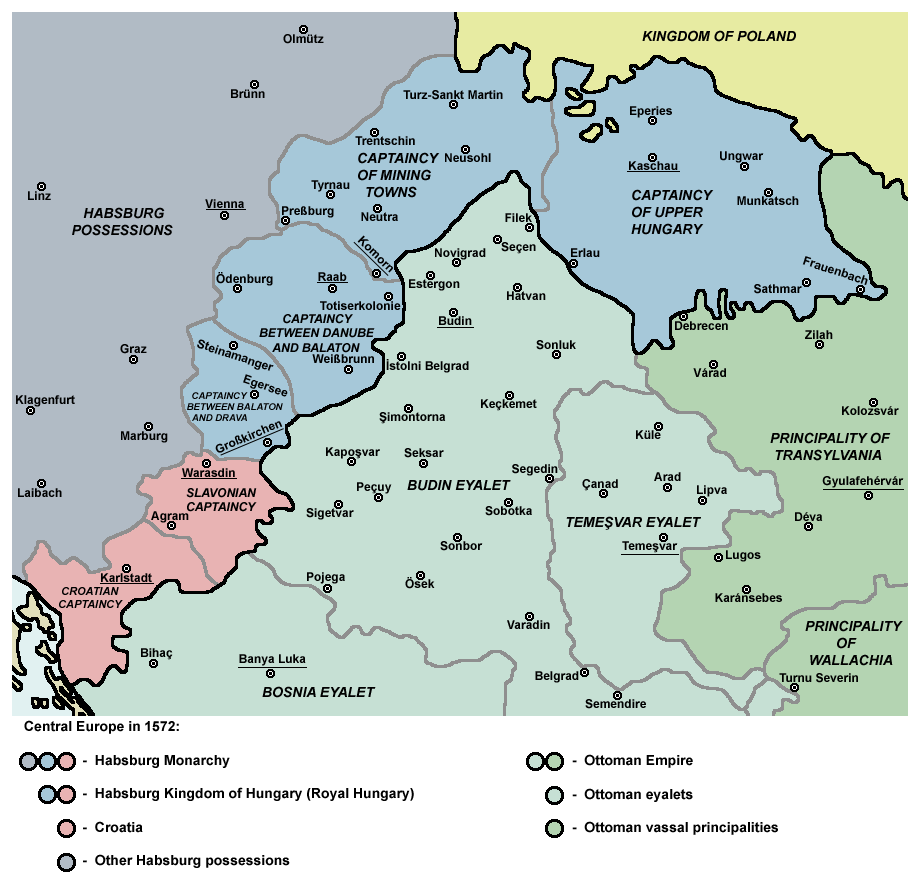
The political situation around 1572: Ottoman eyalets, the Ottoman Principality of Transylvania, and the Habsburg-ruled captaincies of the remaining Kingdom of Hungary.

Whereas a great many of the 17,000 and 19,000 Ottoman soldiers in service in the Ottoman fortresses in the territory of present-day Hungary were Ottoman Muslims (including Muslim South Slavs, Turks, Albanians, Muslim Greeks, and even Muslim Hungarians) Ottoman Christians (including Eastern Orthodox Voynuks) served as akıncıs and other light troops intended for pillaging in the territory of present-day Hungary.

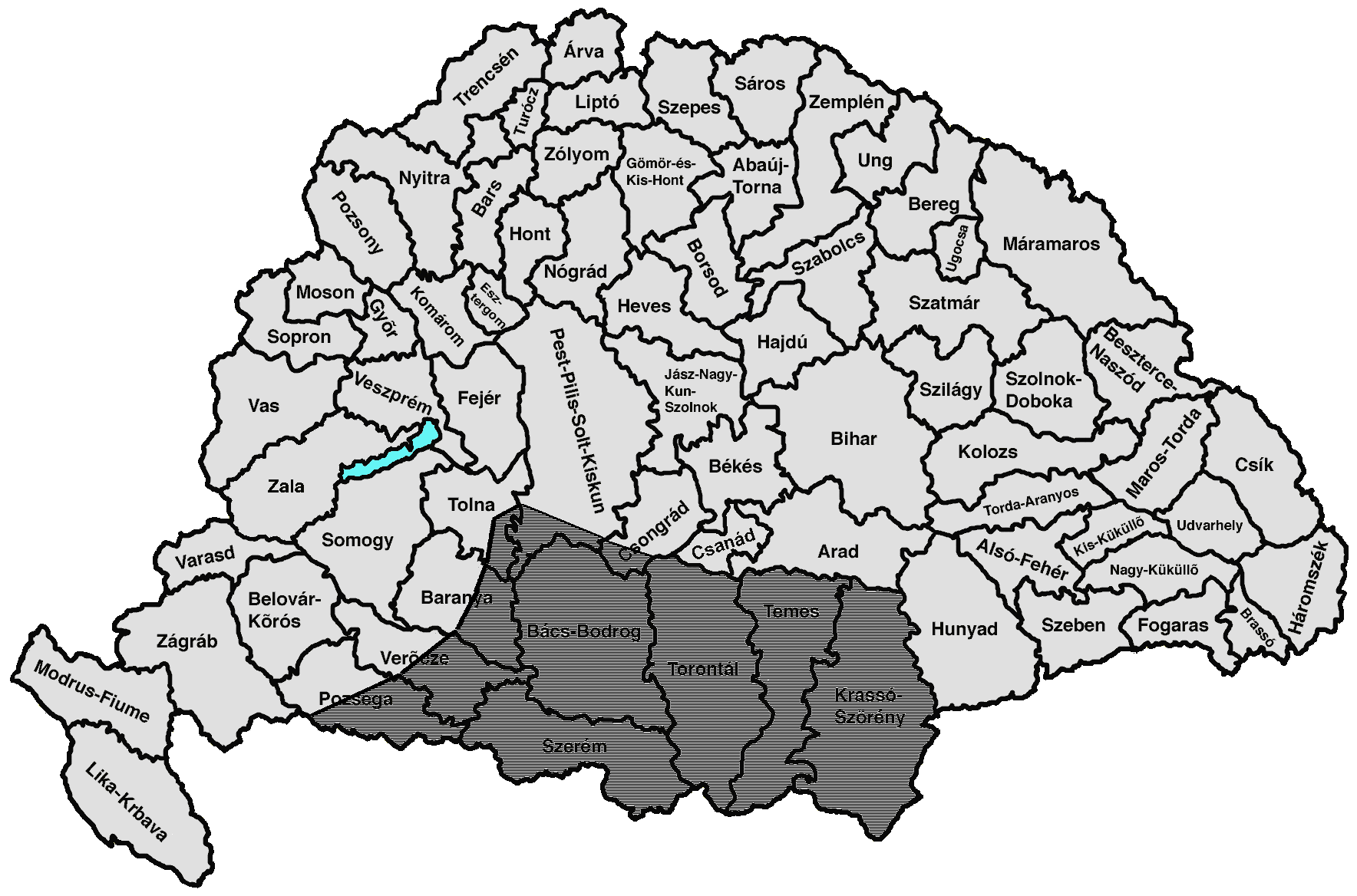
The 1881 map of Hungary showing the boundaries of the almost completely destroyed Hungarian settlement areas during the Ottoman occupation of Hungary

In these times, the territory of present-day Hungary began to undergo changes due to the Ottoman occupation. Vast lands remained unpopulated and covered with woods. Flood plains became marshes. The life of the inhabitants on the Ottoman side was unsafe. Peasants fled to the woods and marshes, forming guerrilla bands, known as the Hajdú troops. Eventually, the territory of present-day Hungary became a drain on the Ottoman Empire, swallowing much of its revenue into the maintenance of a long chain of border forts. However, some parts of the economy flourished. In the huge unpopulated areas, townships bred cattle that were herded to south Germany and northern Italy - in some years they exported 500,000 head of cattle. Wine was traded to the Czech lands, Austria and Poland.

The defeat of Ottoman forces led by Grand Vizier Kara Mustafa Pasha at the Second Siege of Vienna in 1683, at the hands of the combined armies of Poland and the Holy Roman Empire under John III Sobieski swung the balance of power in the region. Still, in 1686, Buda was recaptured by the Ottomans. In 1699, under the terms of the Treaty of Karlowitz, which ended the Great Turkish War, the Ottomans ceded to Habsburgs much of the territory they had previously taken from the medieval Kingdom of Hungary. Following this treaty, the members of the Habsburg dynasty administered a much enlarged Habsburg Kingdom of Hungary (previously they controlled only area known as "Royal Hungary"; see Kingdom of Hungary (1526–1867)).

In the 1540s, the total of the four principal fortresses of Buda (2,965), Pest (1,481), Székesfehérvár (2,978) and Esztergom (2,775) were 10,200 troops.

The number of Ottoman garrison troops stationed in Ottoman Hungary vary, but during the peak period in the mid-16th century it rose to between 20,000 and 22,000 men. As a force of occupation for a country the size of Hungary, even confined to central portions it was a rather low-profile military presence in much of the country and a relatively large proportion of it was concentrated in a few key fortresses.

In 1640 when the front remained relatively quiet, 8,000 Janissary supported by an undocumented number of local recruits was sufficient to garrison the whole of the Eyalet of Budin.

Over the next two decades following the Peace of Vasvár in 1664, Ottoman influence was significant in Habsburg-controlled areas in the north and northwest of the former Kingdom of Hungary. This extended across most of present-day Slovakia and into the area around the eastern border of present-day Austria. Attitudes towards the Ottoman Empire amongst the locals in these areas were diverse. Demonstrations of pro-Ottoman attitudes included those by town magistrates who welcomed Ottoman troops, and arranged public prayers for Ottoman victory. In 1682, the Ottomans established the Principality of Upper Hungary, which covered most of present-day Slovakia. This Ottoman vassal fell in 1685, following Imre Thokoly’s defeat at the Battle of Eperjes. The 1683 Ottoman Siege of Vienna (the capital of present-day Austria) and subsequent Battle of Vienna, marked the height of Ottoman expansion efforts into Habsburg territory.

== Administration ==
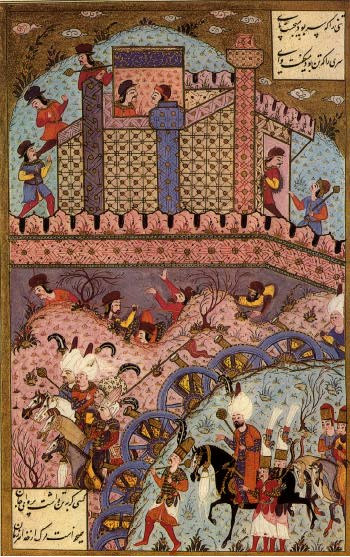
Ottoman soldiers besiege İstolni Belgrad (probably Székesfehérvár) in Hungary.

The Hungarian Ottoman province covered about 91,250 km^{2} (35,230 sq mi). The territory was divided into Eyalets (provinces), which were further divided into Sanjaks, with the highest ranking Ottoman official being the Pasha of Budin. At first, Ottoman-controlled territories in present-day Hungary were part of the Budin Eyalet. Later, new eyalets were formed: Temeşvar Eyalet, Zigetvar Eyalet, Kanije Eyalet, Eğri Eyalet, and Varat Eyalet. Administrative centers of Budin, Zigetvar, Kanije and Eğri eyalets were located in the territory of present-day Hungary, while Temeşvar and Varat eyalets that had their administrative centers in the territory of present-day Romania also included some parts of present-day Hungary. Pashas and Sanjak-Beys were responsible for administration, jurisdiction and defense.

The Sublime Porte (Ottoman rulers) became the sole landowner and managed about 20 percent of the land for its own benefit, apportioning the rest among soldiers and civil servants. The Ottoman landlords were interested mainly in squeezing as much wealth from the land as quickly as possible. Of major importance to the Sublime Porte was the collection of taxes. Taxation left little for the former landlords to collect; Most of the nobility and large numbers of burghers emigrated into the Habsburg Kingdom of Hungary ("Royal Hungary") province.

After the final Ottoman conquest of Hungary in 1541, there were frequent border raids by Ottoman and Crimean troops toward Christian border lands, during which civilian were killed or captured, marched away and sold in to slavery in the Ottoman Empire at the slave markets of Istanbul and Sarajevo. Between 1522 and 1717, Tatars, soldiers from the Crimean Khanate, often participated in the Ottoman campaigns in the Hungarian border zones, and during these campaigns the tatars often captured slaves in Hungary and Austria; the long way back to the Crimea did provide opportunity for prisoners to escape, but many were abducted to Crimea, where they were either ransomed (if they were rich), or (if they were poor) sold on the Crimean slave trade.

Wars, slave raids, and the emigration of nobles who lost their land caused a depopulation of the countryside. However, the Ottomans practiced relative religious tolerance and allowed the various ethnicities living within the empire a degree of autonomy in internal affairs. Towns maintained some self-government, and a prosperous middle class developed through artisanry and trade.

== Ethnic changes under Ottoman rule ==
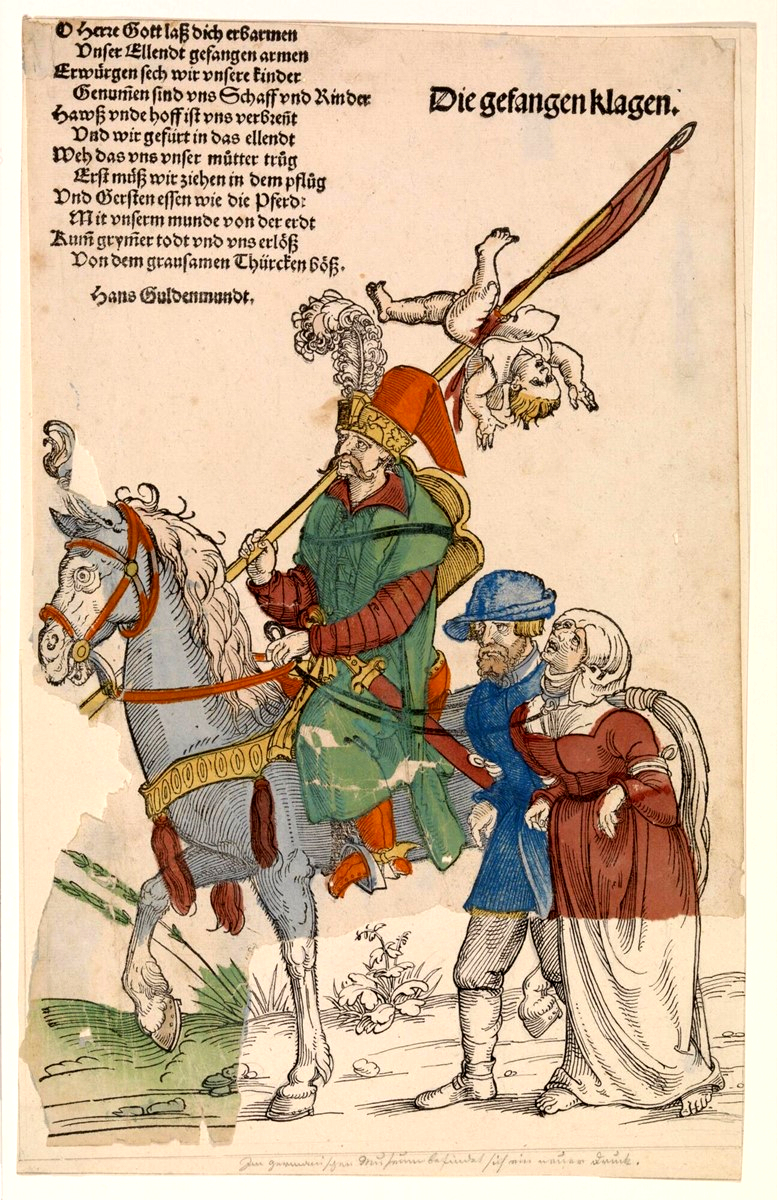
Turkish soldier dragging slaves (Hans Guldenmund)

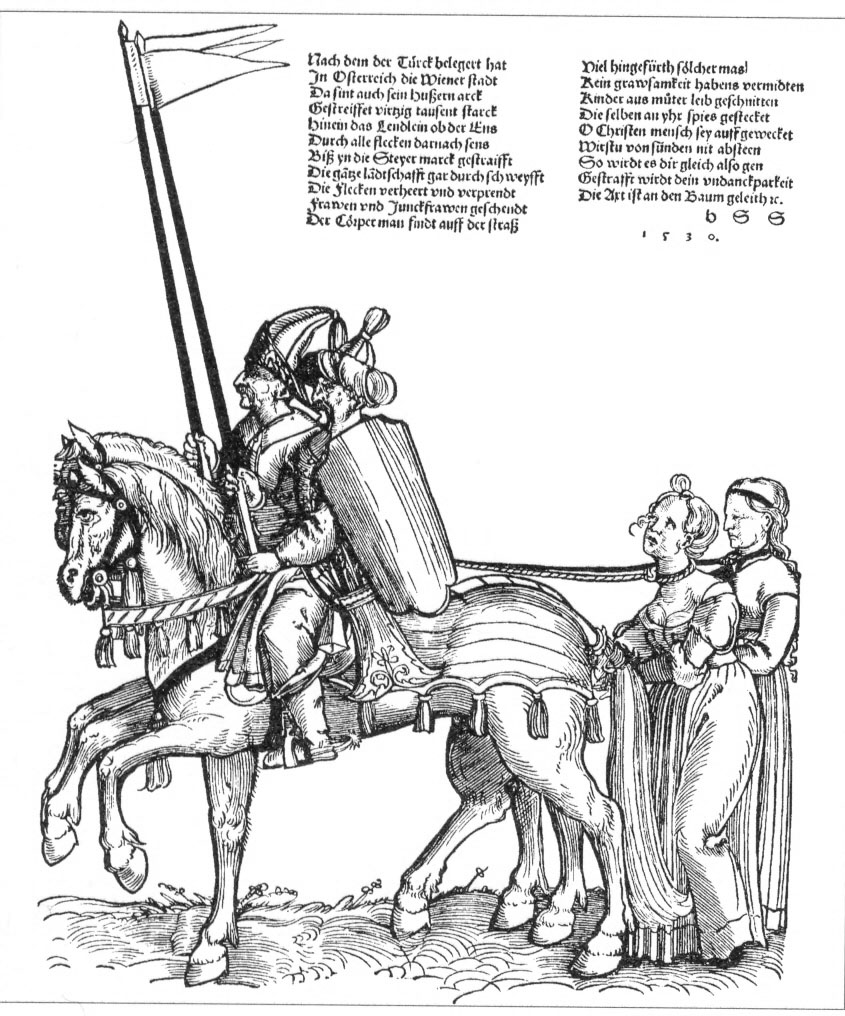
Turkish raiders carry captives tied to slave belts

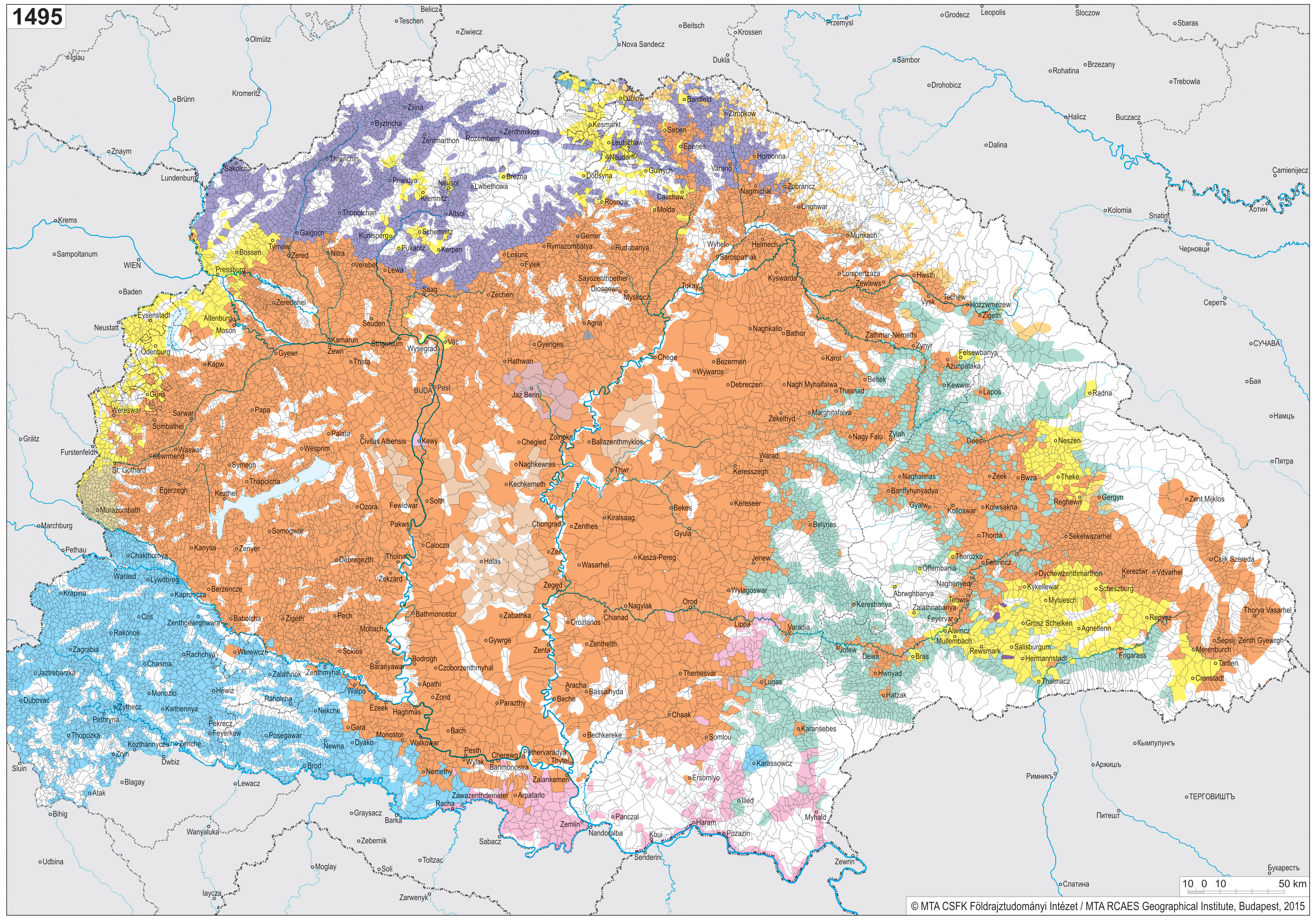

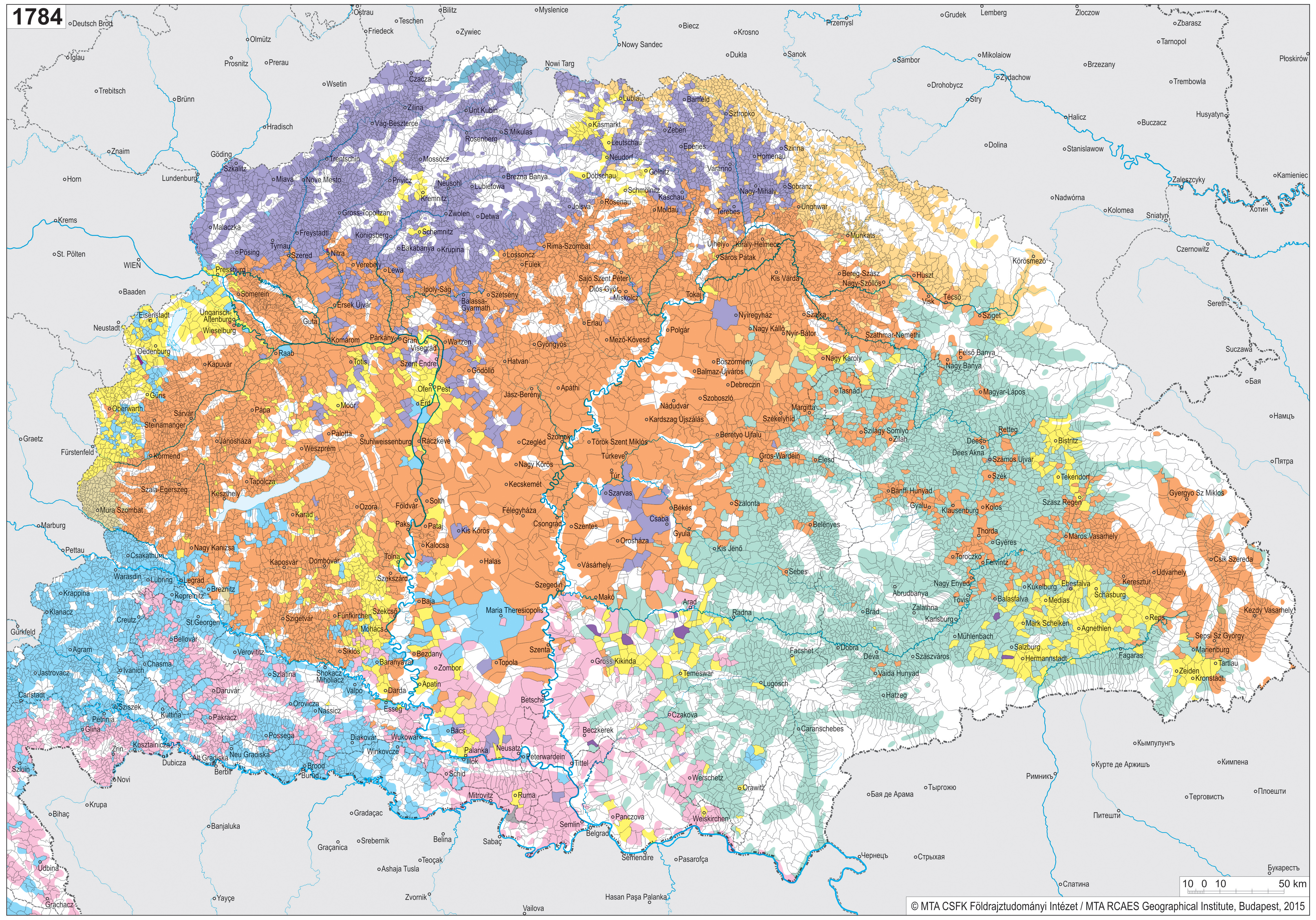
Estimated ethnic maps of the Kingdom of Hungary in 1495 (before Ottoman rule) and in 1784 (decades after Ottoman rule) by the Hungarian Academy of Sciences, based on research from Hungarian scholars. Hungarians are depicted in orange, the ethnic pattern of Hungary changed due to the centuries long wars and migration movements. The date 1495 is based on a nationwide registry conducted in the Kingdom of Hungary by commission of the royal treasury. The 1495 map shows the estimated absolute or relative linguistic majority of the local population based on the family names of taxpayers recorded in national or domanial registers, the linguistic analysis of the names of geographic objects and on various scholarly sources. The date 1784 is based a census of Joseph II. The 1784 map show the estimate of linguistic majorities at settlement level on the basis of ecclesiastical registers, gazetteers and monographs, which also contained contemporary language and religious data.

For more than 150 years, the territory of Hungary was a battleground between the forces of the great powers. The military conflict was constant during the entire period of the Ottoman rule. Hungary endured a great number of Ottoman military campaigns and sieges from 1521 to 1568, at the same time when Hungary had an ongoing struggle between its two kings (Austrian Habsburg family and the Hungarian noble Zápolya family). From 1591, and between 1593 and 1606, during the Long Turkish War, there were armed conflicts involving large military forces. From 1660 and between 1663 and 1664, during the Austro-Turkish War, also between 1683 and 1699 during Hungary's War of Liberation from the Ottoman occupation, the opposing sides fielded armies of about 50,000 soldiers in every year. During the Ottoman rule, the relative calm periods were also not peaceful, the wars were ongoing at the borders. The raids were daily, primarily intended for tax collection and plundering, which caused significant damage in the Hungarian settlement areas: material destruction, population displacement, kidnapping and killing people. In the 17th century, the campaigns waged by Principality of Transylvania caused also similarly significant losses.

The decay of the southernmost counties of the Kingdom of Hungary had started long before the Ottoman rule, the Ottomans had already invaded Hungary's southern parts between 1390 and 1400.

As a consequence of the 150 years of constant warfare between the Christian states and Ottomans, population growth was stunted, and the network of ethnic Hungarian medieval settlements, with their urbanized bourgeois inhabitants, perished. The ethnic composition of the territory that had been part of the medieval Kingdom of Hungary was fundamentally changed through deportations and massacres, so that the number of ethnic Hungarians in existence at the end of the Ottoman period was substantially diminished.

The Hungarian journey of Evliya Çelebi, a Turkish traveller in 1660–1664:

The Tatars raided on that day and night. In a location called Szatmár some thousand enemy [the local inhabitants] encamped in a marshy place... The infidels all came out of the marshy place and there was massacre and fighting for three hours... When they arrived on the plain, the Tartars turned back at once and engaged the enemy [the local inhabitants] with the border warriors; some of them were put to the sword, all their possessions, as well as the children and women were taken and captured, and on the seventh day they returned to the camp with much booty and twenty thousand prisoners. When the prisoners were taken to the Islamic market, they were more than twice as many as our soldiers. My servants also brought three Hungarian students... In the meantime, due to the large number of prisoners, fear arose in the Islamic camp, and by order of the chief serdar, the children, girls and young women were kept, and nine thousand of the men fit to wield swords were killed on the shore of the Szamos river... With the blessing of Lord Melek Ahmed Pasha, on the eighth day of the Feast Eid al-Adha in the year 1071 [1662], with twenty thousand selected Tatar soldiers who started with forty or fifty thousand wind-speed horses... trusting in Allah, we went out of the Islamic camp and that day and night in the Transylvanian part of the Tisza river, burning and destroying a few hundred villages and towns, we reached Belső-Szolnok county. It was a cultivated and populous district, but it was destroyed without any trace of prosperity, and its inhabitants were taken prisoner. The next day we set fire to four towns and destroyed some villages, their inhabitants were partly taken prisoner and partly lost. Allahu Akbar! It is such a large plain and so populous countryside... However, when it was burned, it was so destroyed that only its land, its stone churches, and its towers remained, and his infidel and fornicate people all went into captivity. While we were here, we wandered without fear, destroying the western part to the right and then to the left, and came here between eating and drinking.

— Evliya Çelebi: Seyahatnâme

The economic decline of Buda, the Hungarian capital at the time of the Ottoman conquest, was emblematic of its stagnated growth rate. The city's population was no larger in 1686 than it had been two centuries prior. The Ottomans allowed the Hungarian royal palace to fall into ruins. The Ottomans later transformed the palace into a gunpowder store and magazine, which caused its detonation during the siege in 1686. The Christian Hungarian population significantly shrank in the next decades, due to them fleeing to the Habsburg-ruled Royal Hungary, especially by 1547 the number of the original Christian population of Buda was down to about a thousand, and by 1647 it had fallen to only about seventy. The number of Jewish and Gypsy immigrants became dominant during the Ottoman rule in Buda.

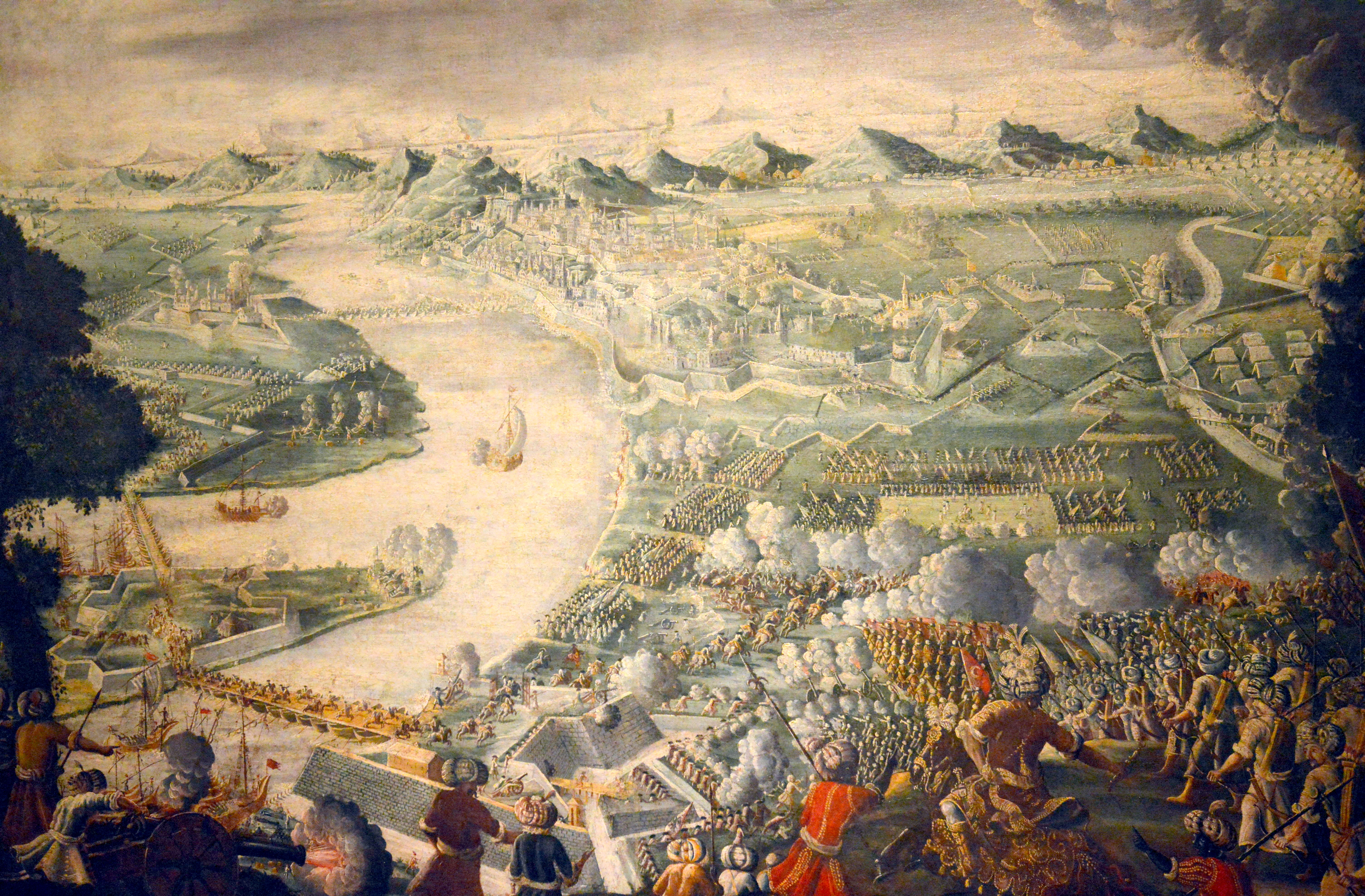
The Holy League took Buda after a long siege in 1686

The Hungarian inhabitants of cities moved to other places when they felt threatened by the Ottoman military presence. Without exception, in the cities that became Ottoman administrative centers the Christian population decreased. The Hungarian population remained only in some cities, where the Ottoman garrisons were not installed. From the early 17th century, Serbian refugees were the ethnic majority in large parts of Ottoman-controlled Hungary. That area included territories between the great rivers Sava, Drava, and the Danube–Tisza Interfluve (the territory between the Danube and Tisza rivers).

According to estimates made by Hungarian historians, the proportion of Hungarians in the Carpathian Basin was around 75-80% at the end of the 15th century, and non-Hungarians were little more than 20 to 25% of the total population. The Hungarian population began to decrease at the time of the Ottoman conquest. The decline of the Hungarians was due to the constant wars, Ottoman raids, famines, and plagues during the 150 years of Ottoman rule. The main zones of war were the territories inhabited by the Hungarians, so the death toll depleted them much faster than other nationalities.

In the 16th and 17th centuries, the Ottoman conquest turned Kingdom of Hungary into a battlefield. According to Hungarian historiography, the ethnic pattern of Hungary changed significantly due to the centuries long wars. During the Ottoman occupation, the Principality of Transylvania maintained the continuity of Hungarian statehood. The Habsburg–Wallachian military campaigns between 1599 and 1604, and Ottoman–Tatar military campaigns between 1657 and 1661 were destructive for the Hungarians living in the region and the Hungarian settlements connecting the Hungarian ethnic blocks of the Partium and Székely Land suffered the most extensive destruction. Between the Battle of Mohács in 1526 and the suppression of Rákóczi's War of Independence in 1711, the Hungarian and Catholic dominated population structure of the Late Medieval Kingdom of Hungary was broken up, in Transylvania the Romanians became majority and the Hungarians became a minority population, and in the more sheltered mountainous regions, the Romanian population steadily grew, benefiting from additional immigration from Wallachia and Moldavia.

The three parts of Hungary, the Habsburg Hungary, Ottoman Hungary and Transylvania, experienced only minor differences in population increase in the 17th century.

The South Slavic peoples (Serbs, Bosnian Muslims) expanded northward in the wake of the Ottoman conquest, while the Hungarian population that had survived it fled the area over the course of the 17th century. Throughout the 17th century, the newly settled Orthodox South Slavic population provided the Ottoman army in this region with military garrisons, logistical support, and food supplies. Consequently, the Hungarians derisively referred to the region of Ottoman conquest as "Rascia" (Serbia) thereafter.

The Magyarab people are a small Magyar (Hungarian) community living within Nubia, along the Nile in Sudan and Egypt. They have distant Hungarian ancestors who intermarried with locals. The Ottoman Empire had to recruit troops from conquered Christian people, most notably through the devşirme system, a special "tribute in blood", by which the Janissary corps was primarily staffed. In this system, Christian youths were taken, or children were kidnapped during Ottoman raids, primarily from the Balkan provinces, then converted to Islam and drafted into Ottoman service. The Hungarian population was recruited under the Ottoman regime. The Hungarians who were relocated from Hungary to the banks of the Nile were soldiers in the Ottoman army, brought there by Sultan Selim to serve as border guards. These groups of Hungarians ended up in Egypt and Sudan after retiring from military service, concluding their army careers there.

=== Immigration ===
According to the most authoritative studies, the combined population of all three regions grew from about 3.5 million at the close of the 16th century to about 4 million at the close of the 17th century. This increase was before the immigration to Hungary from other parts of the Habsburg Empire. The Ottoman–Habsburg wars of the 17th century were fought intermittently and affected populations occupying a much narrower band of territory. Thus wartime dislocations in Hungary do not seem to have seriously affected mortality rates among the general civilian population. The breakdown of social order and other economic links between contiguous regions that is associated with prolonged warfare of the medieval pattern was largely absent in Ottoman warfare of the 17th century. The most severe destructions were experienced during the Hungarian time of troubles, when between 1604 and 1606 the worst effects of the controlled confrontation between Ottoman-Habsburg forces were magnified many times over by Hungary's descent into civil war during the Bocskay rebellion.

Hungary's population in the late 16th century was in Ottoman Hungary 900,000, in Habsburg Hungary 1,800,000 and 'free' (Transylvania) Hungary 800,000, making a total of 3,500,000 inhabitants for the whole of Hungary.

The population growth in Ottoman Hungary during the 17th century was slight: from 900,000 to approximately 1,000,000 inhabitants, a rate similar to that experienced in Royal Hungary and Transylvania.

== Culture ==
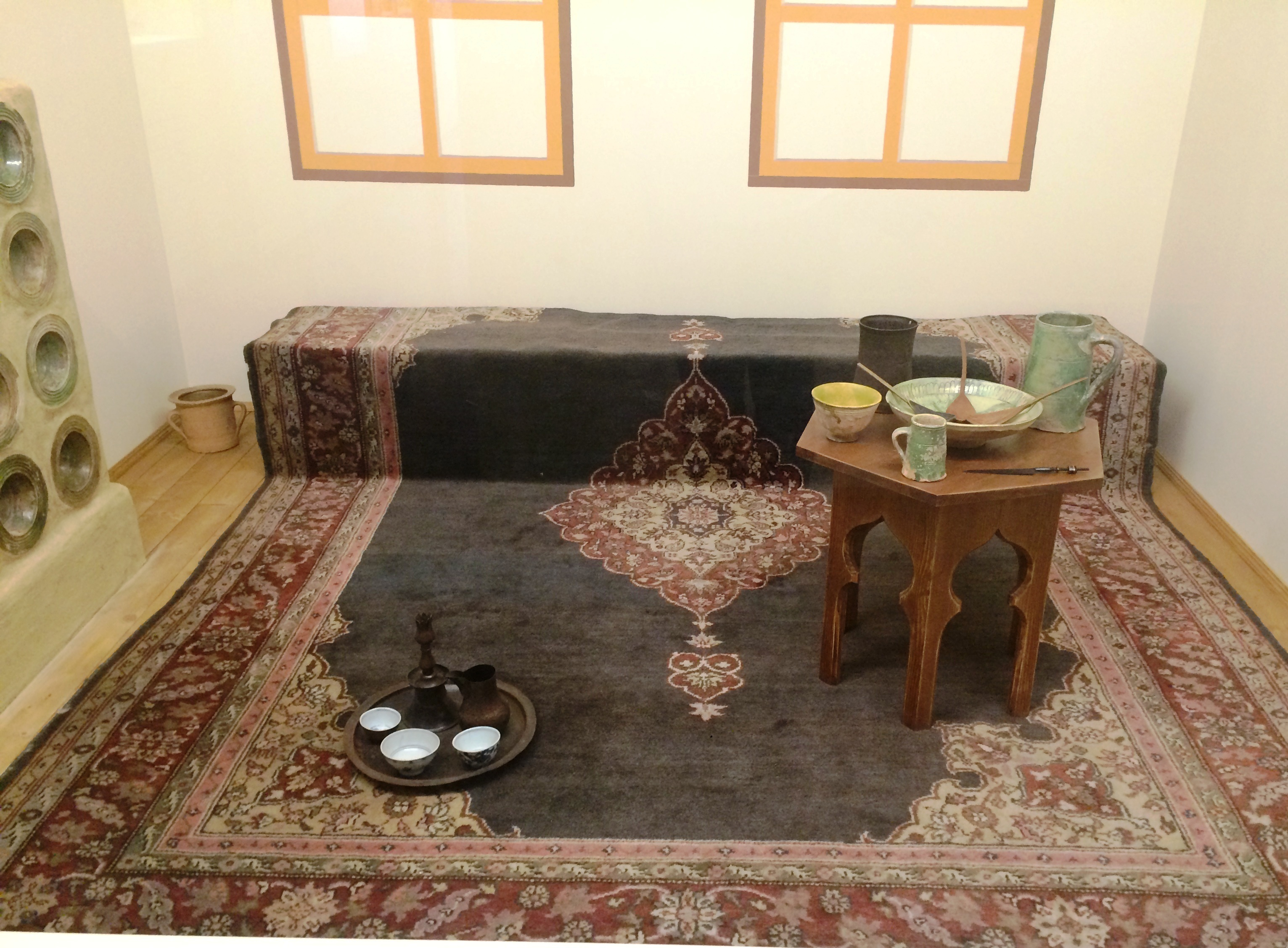
Presentation of items that would have been in a typical Buda household during the Ottoman period

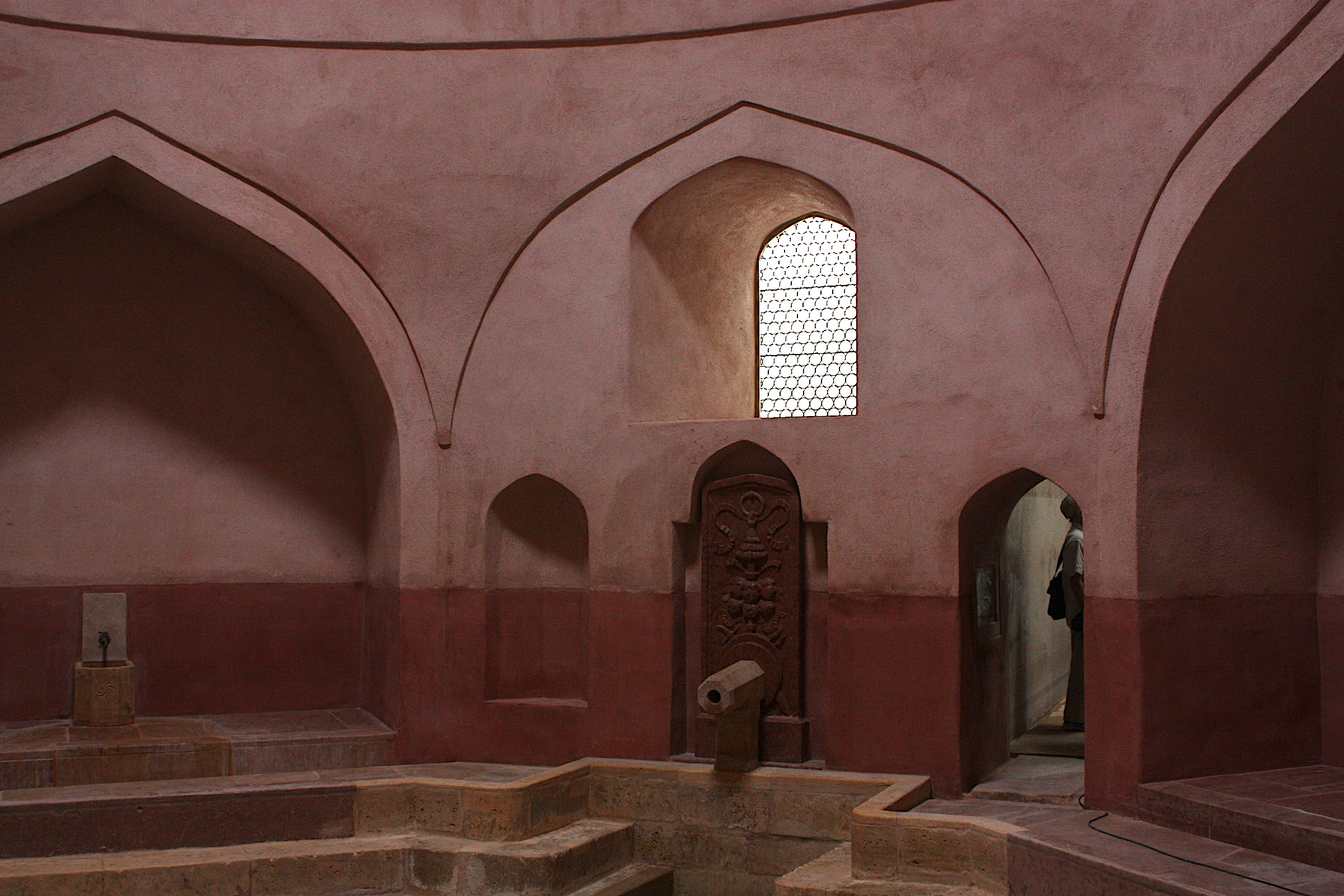
Rác Turkish bath in Budapest

Several Muslim cultural centres sprang up in this northern corner of the Empire. Examples of Ottoman architecture of the classical period, seen in the famous centres of Constantinople and Edirne, were also seen in the territory of present-day southern Hungary, where mosques, bridges, fountains, baths and schools were built. After the Habsburg reclamation, most of these works were destroyed and few survive to this day. The introduction of Turkish baths, with the building of the Rudas Baths, was the beginning of a long tradition in the territory of present-day Hungary. No less than 75 hammams (steam baths) were built during the Ottoman age.

=== Muslim schools in Muslim cities ===
During the 16th and 17th centuries, there were at least five Bektashi convents or dervish lodges established across Hungary: two in Buda, one in Eğri, another in Székesfehérvár, and a fifth one in Lippa. In the 17th century, 165 elementary (mekteb) and 77 secondary and academic theological schools (medrese) were operating in 39 of the major towns of the region. The elementary schools taught writing, basic arithmetics, and the reading of the Koran and of the most important prayers. The medreses carried out secondary and academic training within the fields of Muslim religious sciences, church law and natural sciences. Most medreses operated in Budin (Buda), where there were twelve. In Peçuy (Pécs) there were five medreses, Eğri had four. The most famous medrese in Ottoman-controlled territory of present-day Hungary was that of Budin (Buda), commissioned by the Sokollu Mustafa Pasha during his twelve years of governing (1566–1578).

In the mosques, people not only prayed, but were taught to read and write, to read the Koran, and prayers. The sermons were the most effective form of political education. There were numerous elementary and secondary schools besides the mosques, and the monasteries of the Dervish orders also served as centers of culture and education.

The spread of culture was supported by the libraries. The mosque complex and türbe of Sokollu Mustafa Pasha in Budin (Buda) was built by Ottoman chief architect Mimar Sinan and contained a school and library offering Muslim religious sciences, literature, works on oratory, poetry, astronomy, music, architecture, and medical sciences.

=== Religion ===
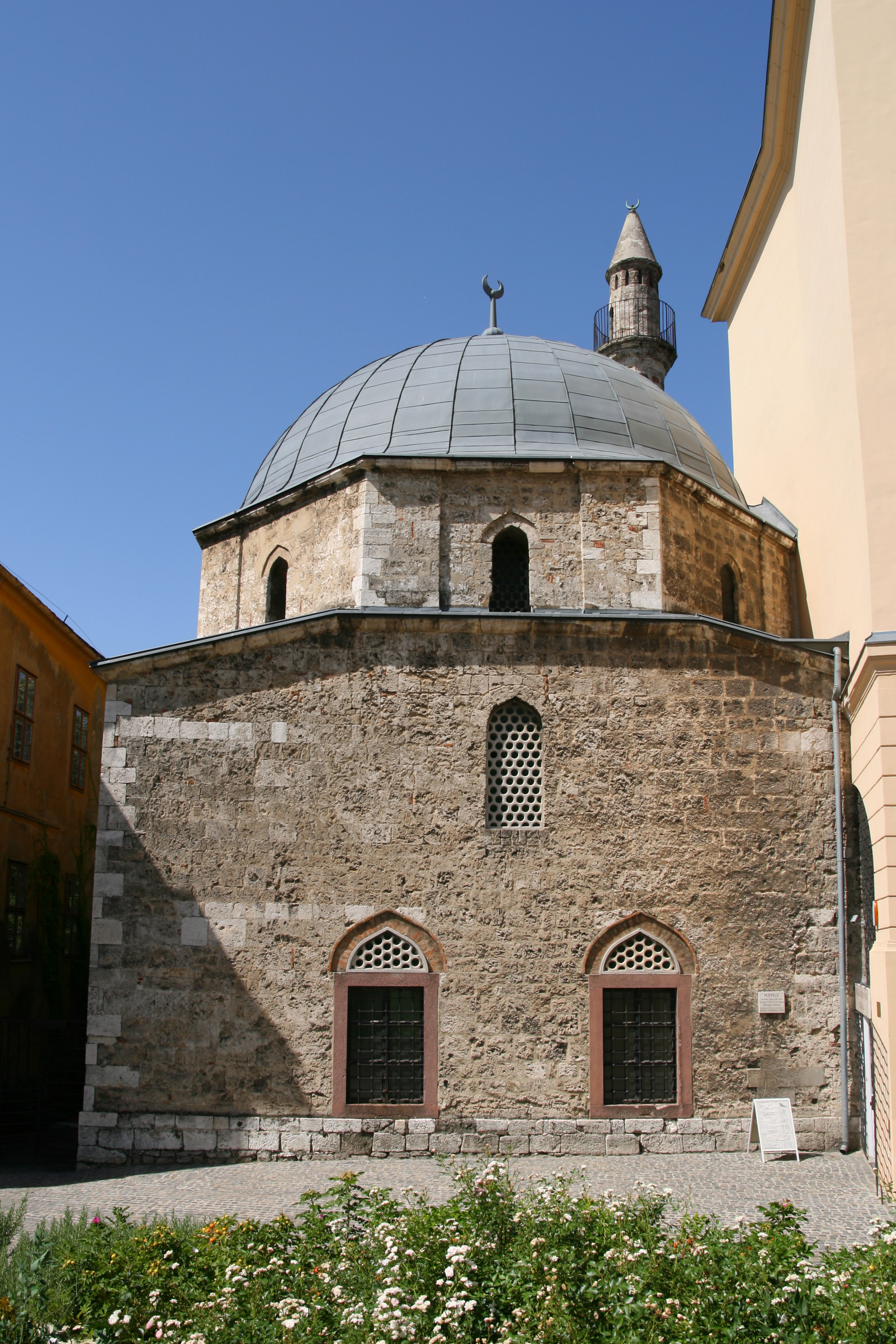
The Yakovalı Hasan Paşa Mosque in Pécs

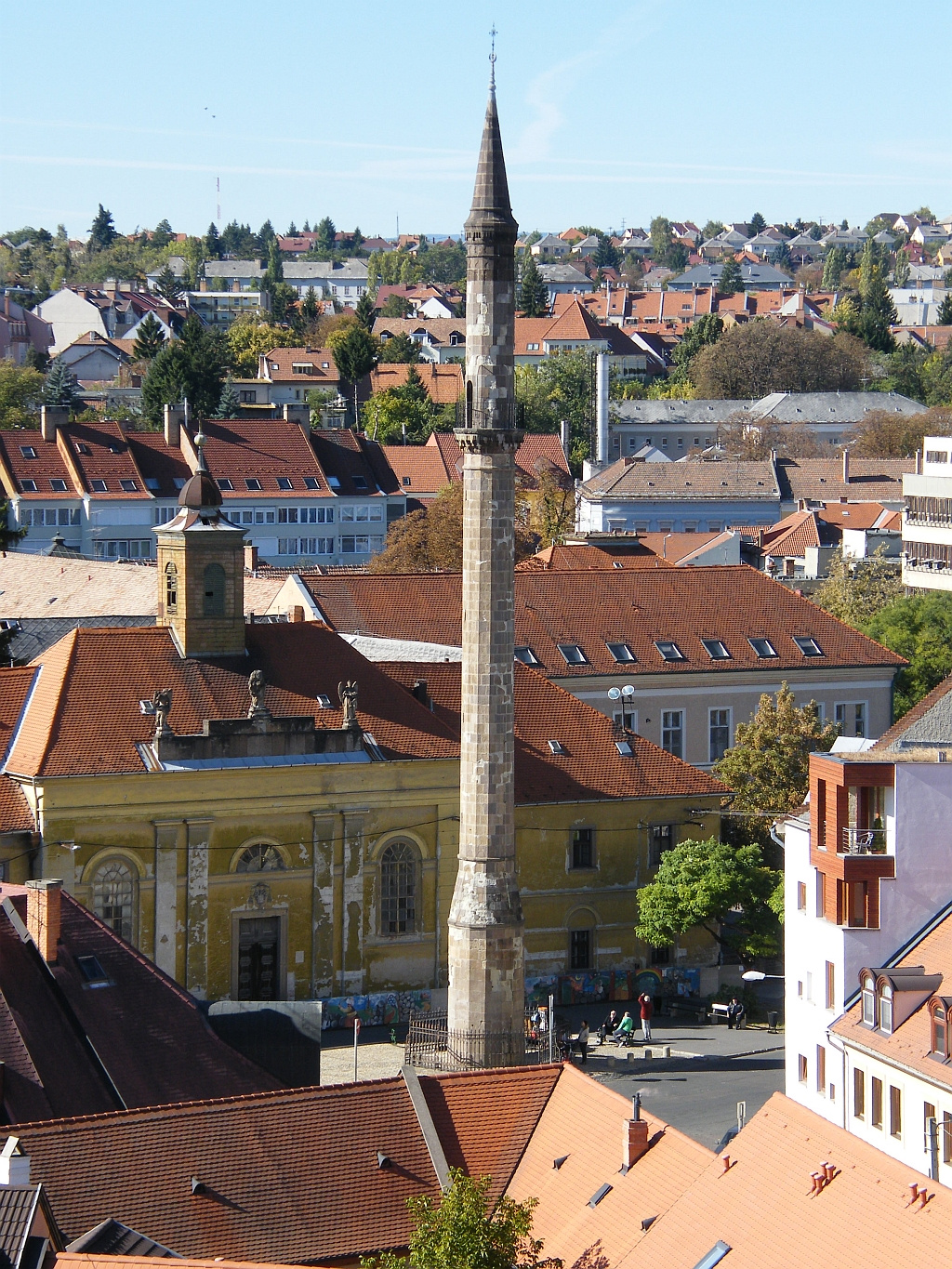
Minaret of Eger

The Ottomans practiced relative religious tolerance, and Christianity was not prohibited. Islam was not spread by force in the areas under the control of the Ottoman Sultan, however, Arnold concludes by quoting a 17th-century author who stated:

Meanwhile he [the Turk] wins [converts] by craft more than by force, and snatches away Christ by fraud out of the hearts of men. For the Turk, it is true, at the present time compels no country by violence to apostatise; but he uses other means whereby imperceptibly he roots out Christianity...

The relative religious tolerance of the Ottomans enabled Protestantism in Hungary (such as the Reformed Church in Hungary) to survive against the oppression of the Catholic Habsburg-ruled Hungarian domains.

There were approximately 80,000 Muslim settlers in the Ottoman-controlled territory of present-day Hungary; being mainly administrators, soldiers, artisans, and merchants of Crimean Tatar origin. The religious life of the Muslims was supervised by the mosques that were either newly built or transformed from older Christian churches. Payment for the servants of the mosques, as well as the maintenance of the churches, was the responsibility of the Ottoman state or charities.

Besides Sunni Islam, a number of dervish communities also flourished including the bektashis, the halvetis, and the mevlevis. The famous Gül Baba monastery of Budin (Buda), sheltering 60 dervishes, belonged to the bektasi order. Situated close to the janissaries camp, it was built by Jahjapasazáde Mehmed Pasha, the third begler bey (governor) of Budin. Gul Baba's tomb (türbe) is to this day the northernmost site of Islamic conquest.

Another famous monastery of its time was that of the halveti dervishes. Built around 1576 next to the türbe of Sultan Süleyman I the Magnificent (1520–1566) in Sigetvar (Szigetvár), it soon became the religious and cultural centre of the area. A famous prior of the zavije (monastery) was the Bosnian Šejh Ali Dede. The monastery of Jakovali Hasan Paša in Peçuy (Pécs) was another famous location. Its most outstanding prior was Mevlevian dervish Peçevi Arifi Ahmed Dede, a Turk and native of Peçuy.

By the end of the sixteenth century, around 90% of the inhabitants of Ottoman Hungary were Protestant, most of them being Calvinist.

Muslims settled in Baranya and Pécs in Ottoman Hungary. Following the successful Habsburg Siege of Pécs, some Muslims converted to Catholicism between 1686 and 1713.

== Gallery ==
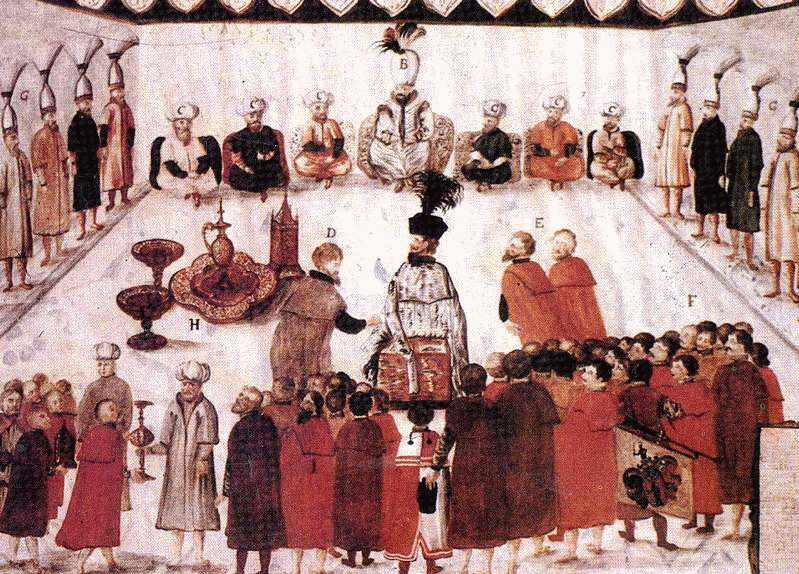
The Ottoman Pasha of Budin (Buda) receives the envoy of the Ottoman Sultan.

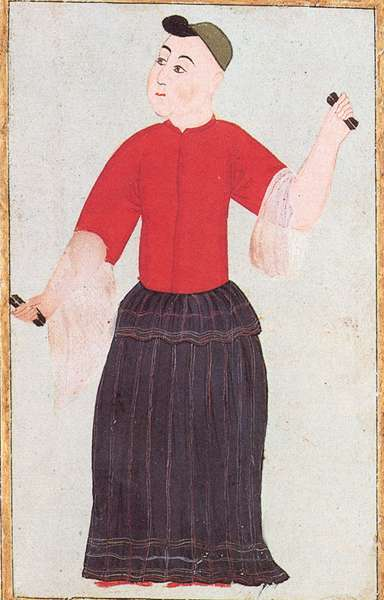
Köçek dancer with castanets. Ottoman miniature by Balázs Szigetvári Csöbör, 1570.

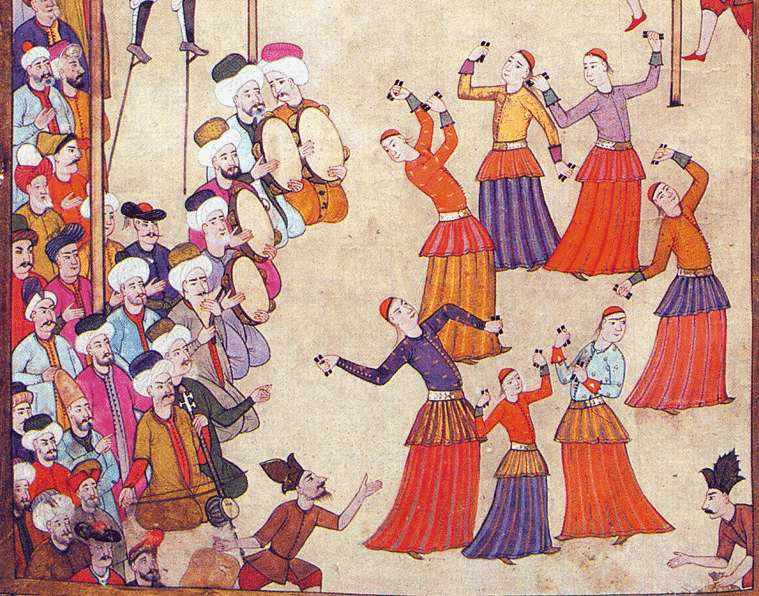
Dancers

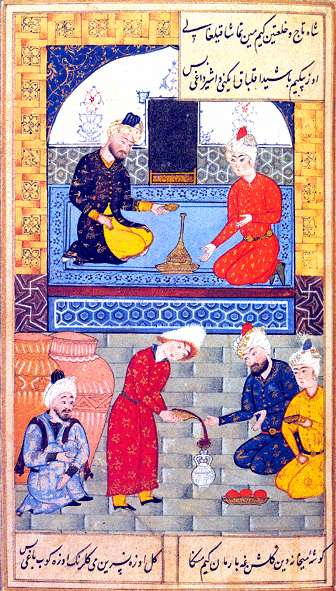
Coffee shop

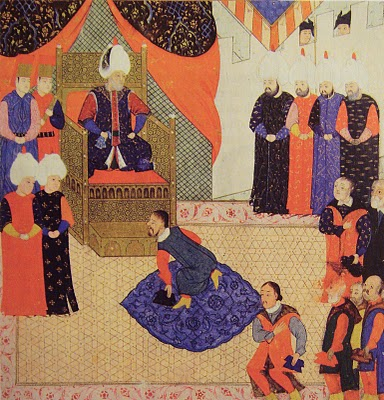
Suleiman the Magnificent with John Sigismund of Hungary in 1556

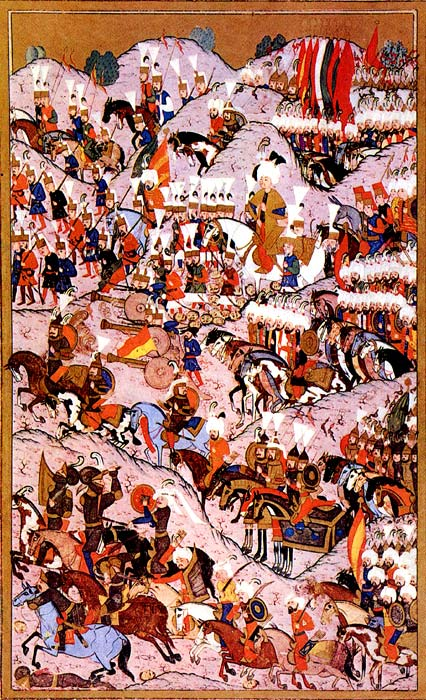
The Battle of Mohacs

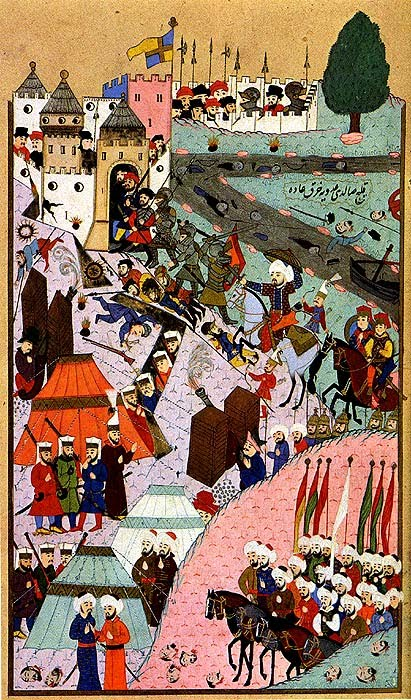
Buda Castle conquest

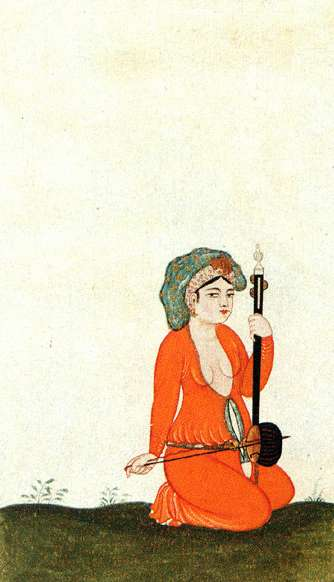
A slave woman musician

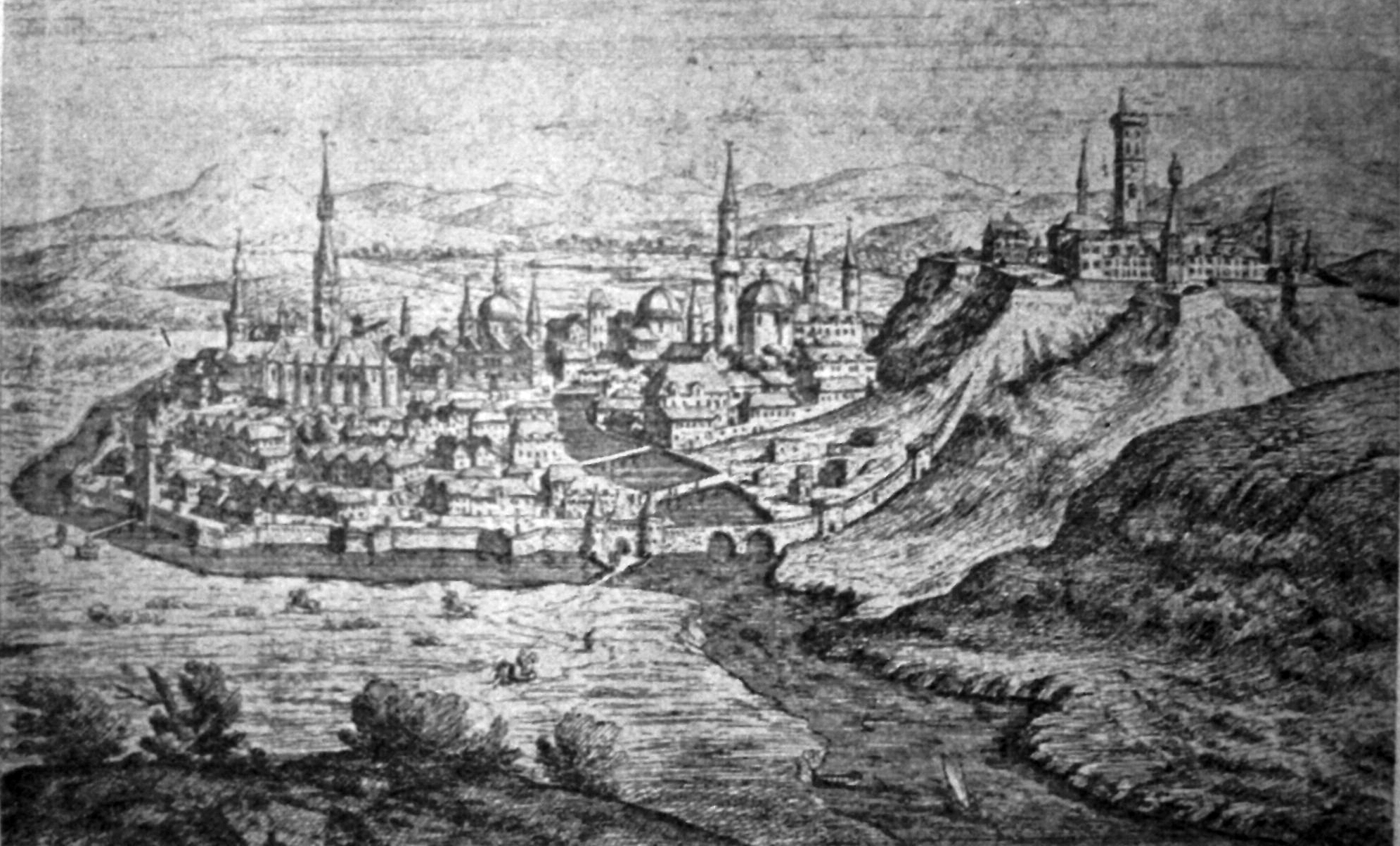
Eger in the 16th century

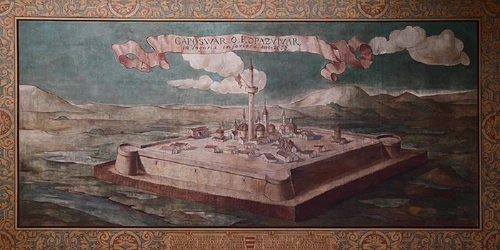
Kaposvár in the 17th century

== See also ==
- Islam in Hungary
- Magyarabs
- Ottoman–Habsburg wars
- Transformation of the Ottoman Empire#Hungary - on the Ottoman defensive system in Hungary.

== Sources ==
- Kontler, László (1999). Millennium in Central Europe: A History of Hungary. Atlantisz Publishing House. ISBN 963-9165-37-9.
- Fodor, Pál; Dávid, Géza, eds. (2000). Ottomans, Hungarians, and Habsburgs in Central Europe: The Military Confines in the Era of Ottoman Conquest. BRILL. ISBN 9004119078.
