= Sanjak of Segedin =

Ottoman subdivision

Sanjak of Segedin Segedin Sancağı (Turkish) Szegedi szandzsák (Hungarian) Сегедински санџак (Serbian)
- Sanjak of the Ottoman Empire
- 16th century–1699
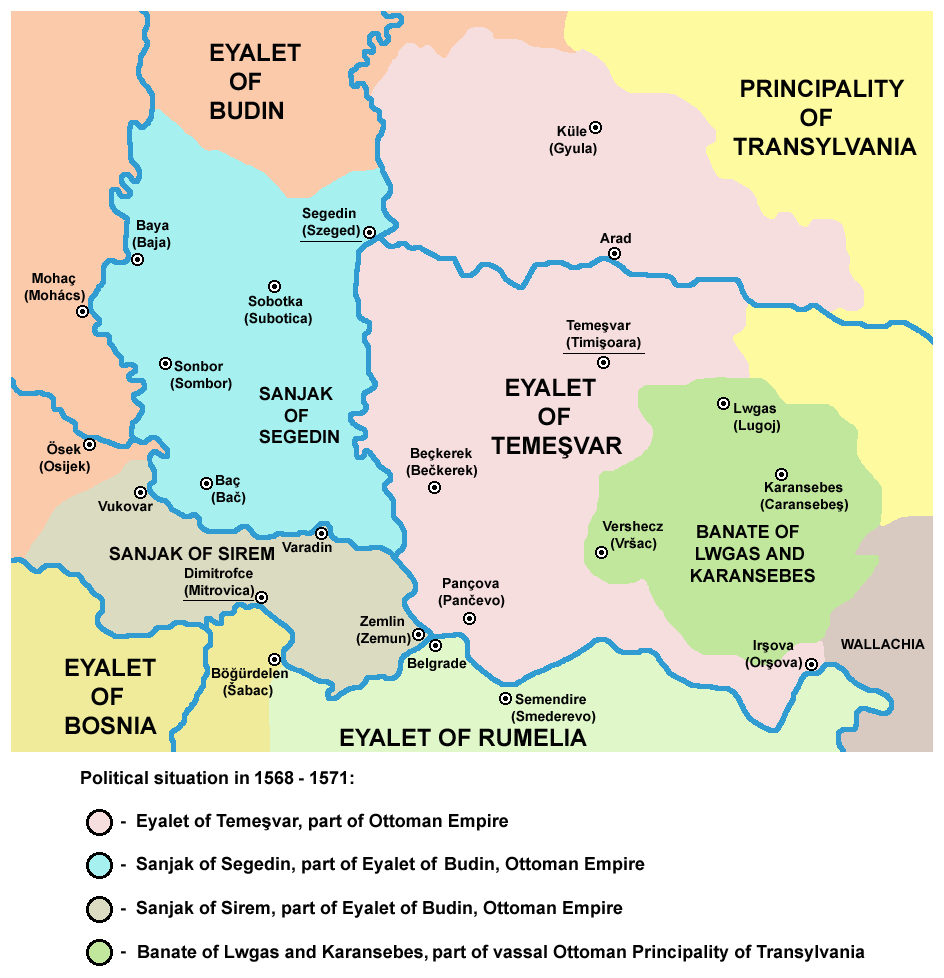
- Sanjak of Segedin as part of the Eyalet of Budin in 1568
- Capital: Segedin (Hungarian: Szeged)
- History
  - Established: 16th century
  - Treaty of Karlowitz: 26 January 1699
Preceded by
Comitatus Bacsensis
Comitatus Bodrogiensis
Comitatus Csongradiensis
Succeeded by
Bács County
Bodrog County
Military Frontier
- Today part of: Serbia, Hungary

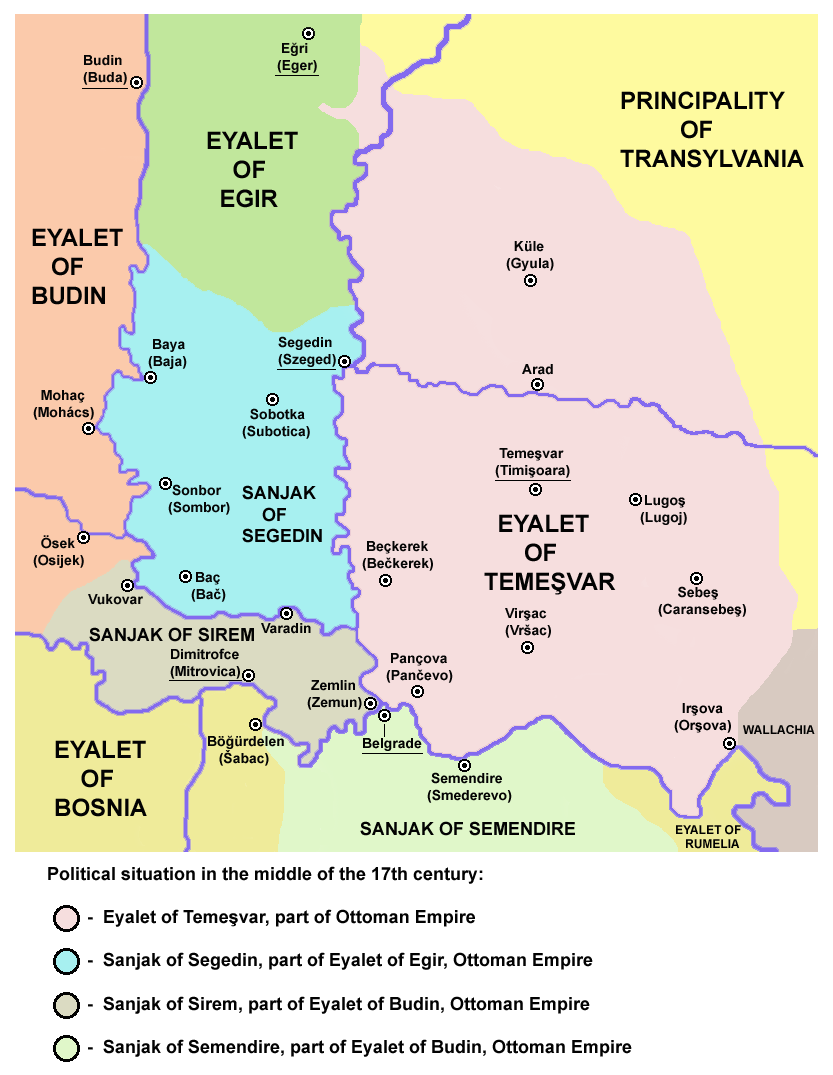
Sanjak of Segedin as part of the Eyalet of Eğri in the middle of the 17th century

Sanjak of Segedin or Sanjak of Szeged (Turkish: Segedin Sancağı; Hungarian: Szegedi szandzsák; Serbian: Сегедински санџак) was an administrative territorial entity of the Ottoman Empire formed in the 16th century. It was located in the Bačka (Bácska) region. Initially, it was part of the Budin Province, but in the 17th century it was included into Eğri Province. The administrative center of the Sanjak of Segedin was Segedin. It was captured by the Habsburg monarchy between 1686-1688, who formally annexed it according to Treaty of Karlowitz in 1699.

== Administrative divisions ==
Sanjak of Segedin was divided into several nahiyes:

- Segedin (Szeged)
- Sobotka (Subotica)
- Kalacsa (Kalocsa)
- Sót (Solt)
- Baya (Baja)
- Sonbor (Sombor)
- Baç (Bač)
- Titel

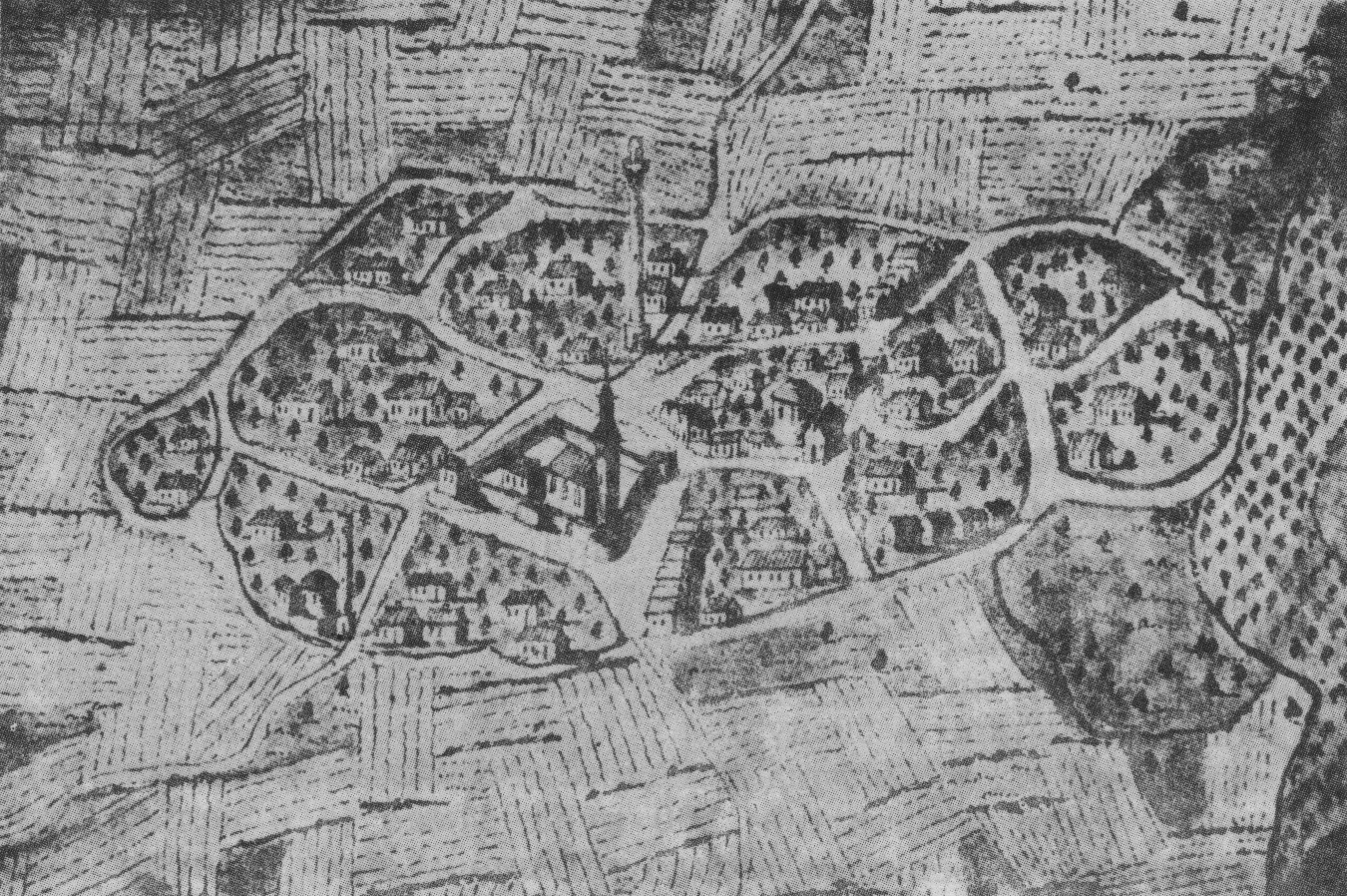
Ottoman Sonbor (Sombor) - image from 1698

== See also ==
- Subdivisions of the Ottoman Empire
- Bačka
