= Eğri Eyalet =

1596–1687 Ottoman province in Hungary and Slovakia

Eyālet-i Egīr Egri ejálet Jegarski ejalet
- Eyalet of the Ottoman Empire
- 1596–1687
- Flag

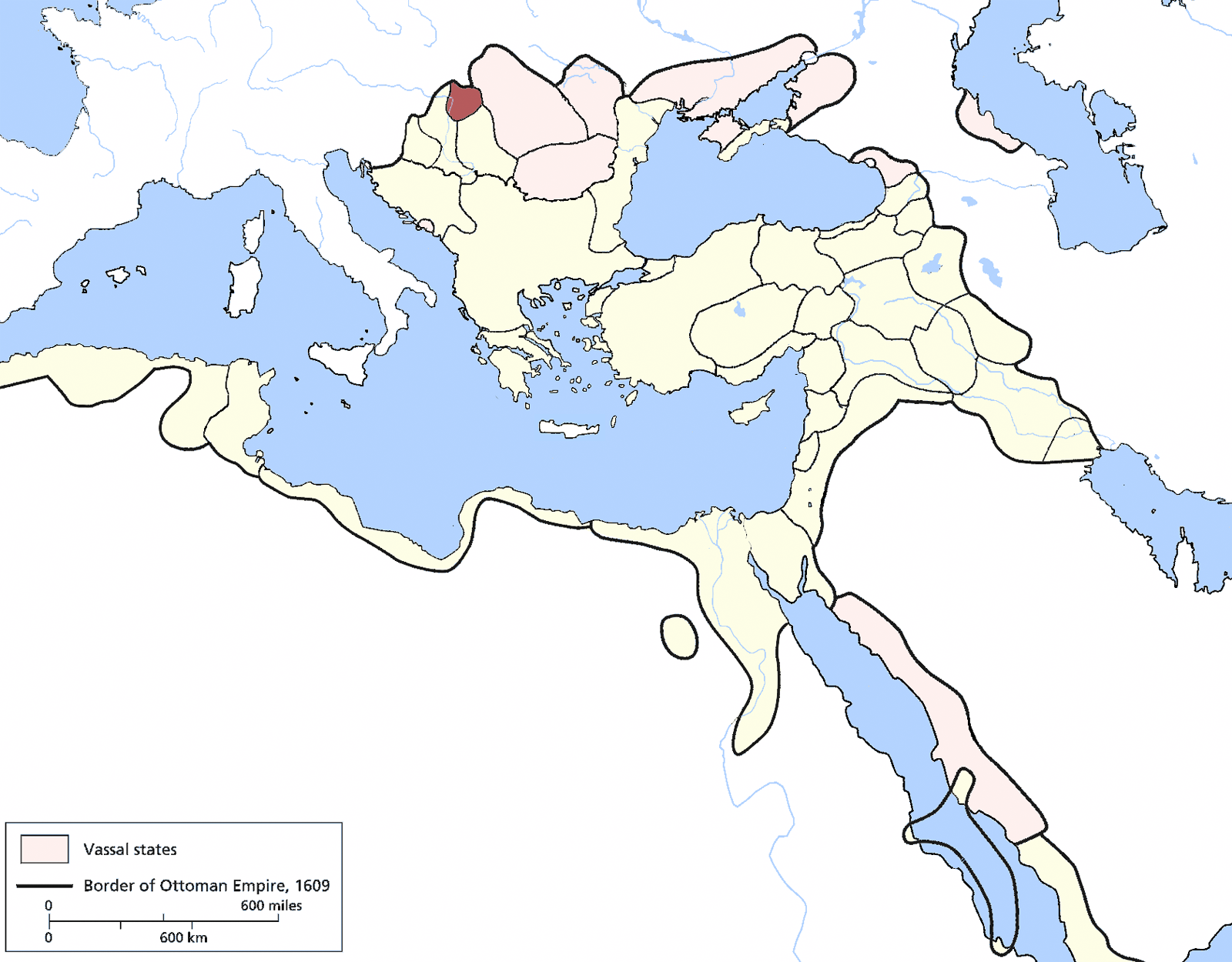
- The Eğri Eyalet in 1609
- Capital: Eğri (Hungarian: Eger)
- Area
  - Coordinates: 47°53′N 20°22′E
- History
  - Siege of Eger: 1596
  - Disestablished: 1687
Preceded by	Succeeded by
Kingdom of Hungary (1538–1867); Budin Eyalet	Habsburg Monarchy
- Today part of: Hungary, Slovakia

Eğri Eyalet (Ottoman Turkish: ایالت اگیر; Eyālet-i Egīr, Hungarian: Egri vilajet, Serbian: Jegarski ejalet or Јегарски ејалет) or Pashaluk of Eğri was an administrative territorial entity of the Ottoman Empire formed in 1596 with its capital at Eğri (Hungarian: Eger). It included parts of present-day Hungary and Slovakia.

The population of the province was ethnically and religiously diverse and included Slovaks and Hungarians (living mainly in the north), Serbs (living mainly in the south), and Muslims of various ethnic origins (living mainly in the cities). Other ethnic communities included Jews and Romani.

== Administrative divisions ==
The province included the following sanjaks:

1. Sanjak of Eğri (Eger)
2. Sanjak of Segedin (Szeged)
3. Sanjak of Sonluk (Szolnok)
4. Sanjak of Seçen (Szécsény)
5. Sanjak of Hatvan (Hatvan)
6. Sanjak of Novigrad (Nógrád)
7. Sanjak of Filek (Filakovo) (Its center was Rim Sonbat)

== See also ==
- Long War (Ottoman wars)
- Ottoman Hungary
- History of Ottoman Serbia
