= Siege of Buda (1541) =

Siege during Little War in Hungary

- Part of the Little War in Hungary
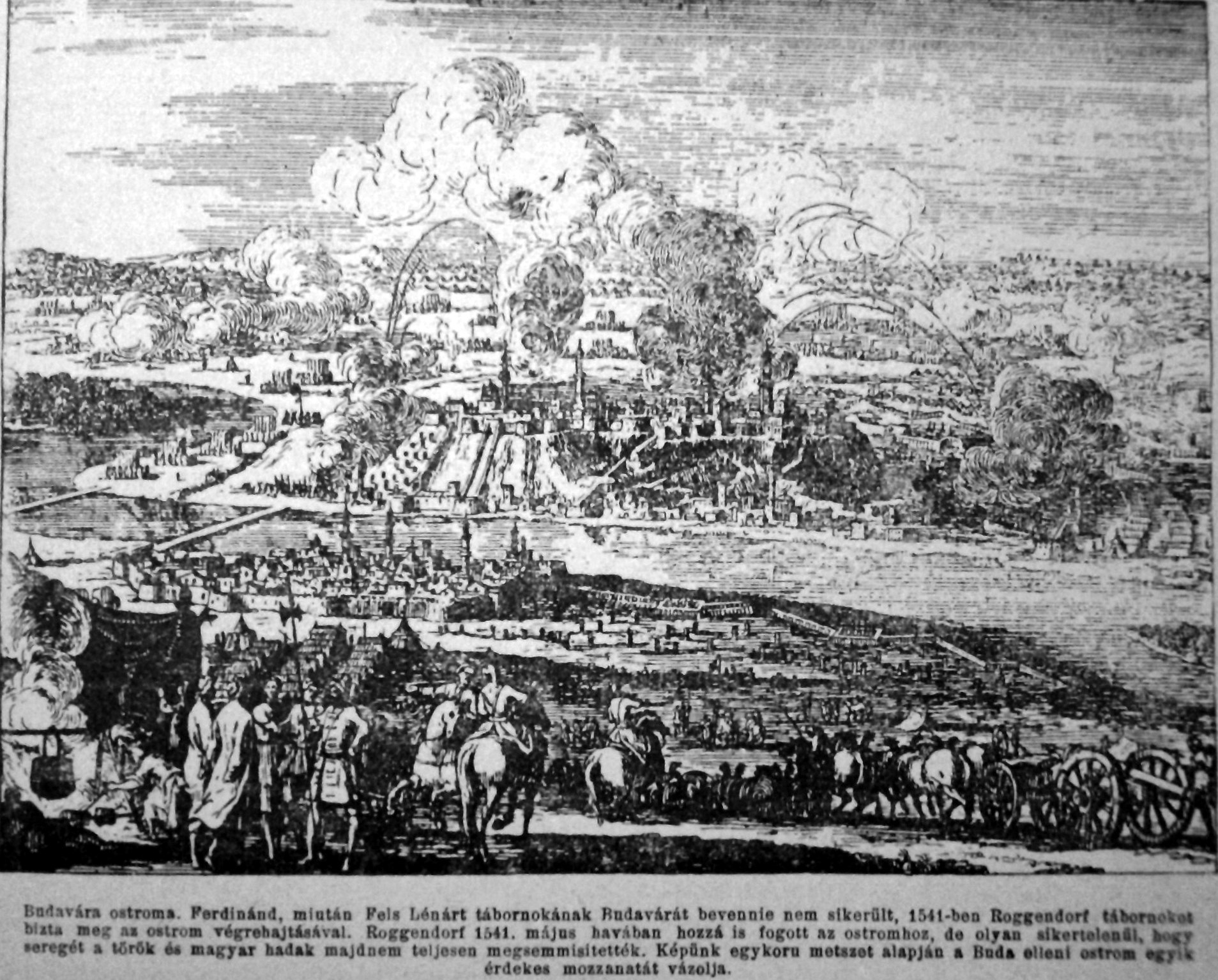
Date	4 May – 21 August 1541
Location	Buda, Hungary 47.502800°N 19.031700°E
Result	Ottoman victory: Ottomans capture Buda; John Sigismund Zápolya restored to the throne

Belligerents
Habsburg Empire: Archduchy of Austria; Holy Roman Empire; Kingdom of Bohemia; Habsburg-held Hungary	Ottoman Empire: John Szapolyai's Hungarian Kingdom

Commanders and leaders
Wilhelm von Roggendorf (DOW); Jeromos Záray †	Suleiman the Magnificent; Şehzade Mehmed; Şehzade Selim; Şehzade Bayezid; Hadım Suleiman Pasha; Damat Rüstem Pasha; Semendireli Mehmed-beg; Bishop George Martinuzzi; Bálint Török

Strength
31,000–50,000	52,000

Casualties and losses
Casualties during the battle: 20,000 killed or drowned Casualties during the siege: Heavy	Unknown

The siege of Buda (4 May – 21 August 1541) ended with the capture of the city of Buda, the historical capital of the Kingdom of Hungary, by the Ottoman Empire, leading to about 150 years of Ottoman rule in parts of Hungary. The siege, part of the Little War in Hungary, was one of the most important Ottoman victories over the Habsburg monarchy during Ottoman–Habsburg wars (16th to 18th century) in Hungary and the Balkans.

== Siege ==
Following the Battle of Mohács, the Kingdom of Hungary became divided between the Ottoman Empire encroaching from the East and the Habsburg monarchy which had inherited the title of King of Hungary.

The Ottoman vassal John I of Hungary died in 1540, and his son John II, who was at that time a minor, was crowned king under the regency of his mother Isabella Jagiellon and bishop George Martinuzzi. This was accepted by the Ottoman ruler Suleiman the Magnificent under the condition that the Hungarians would continue to pay tribute to the Ottoman Sultan. The new king was however not accepted by the Habsburgs. Ferdinand I, Austrian Archduke and a Habsburg, sent an army of 50,000 composed of troops from Austria, German Principalities, Bohemia, and Habsburg Hungary and commanded by Wilhelm von Roggendorf to besiege Buda. The army besieged Buda in Summer 1541. The siege was badly managed and several attacks failed with very high numbers of casualties on the Habsburg side.

Suleiman the Magnificent took personal command of an Ottoman relief army which included 6,362 Janissaries. On 21 August, the Ottoman relief army reached Buda and engaged in battle with Roggendorf's army. The Habsburg army was defeated and 20,000 men were slaughtered or drowned in the river. Roggendorf was also wounded in the battle and died 2 days after of his injuries.

The Ottomans then occupied the city, which in its turn was celebrating the liberation, with a trick: Suleiman the Magnificent invited the infant John II Sigismund Zápolya with the Hungarian noblemen into his tent, meanwhile the Turkish troops began to slowly infiltrate into the fort as "tourists" seemingly in admiration of the architecture of the buildings. However, at a sudden alert they wielded their weapons and disarmed the guards and the whole garrison thereafter. At the same time, the Hungarian noblemen felt uncomfortable in the sultan's tent and wanted to leave. In that moment, on the outcry of the sultan "The black soup (coffee) is still to come!" (Hungarian: "Hátra van még a feketeleves!") the Turkish soldiers disarmed the Hungarian envoy. All of them were allowed to leave with one exception: Bálint Török, whom Suleyman considered a possible powerful opponent. He was taken into captivity and was transferred to Yedikule Fortress, where he spent his remaining life. The Royal Court, the noblemen, and citizens of Buda were allowed to leave the city with their possessions unharmed.

== Aftermath ==
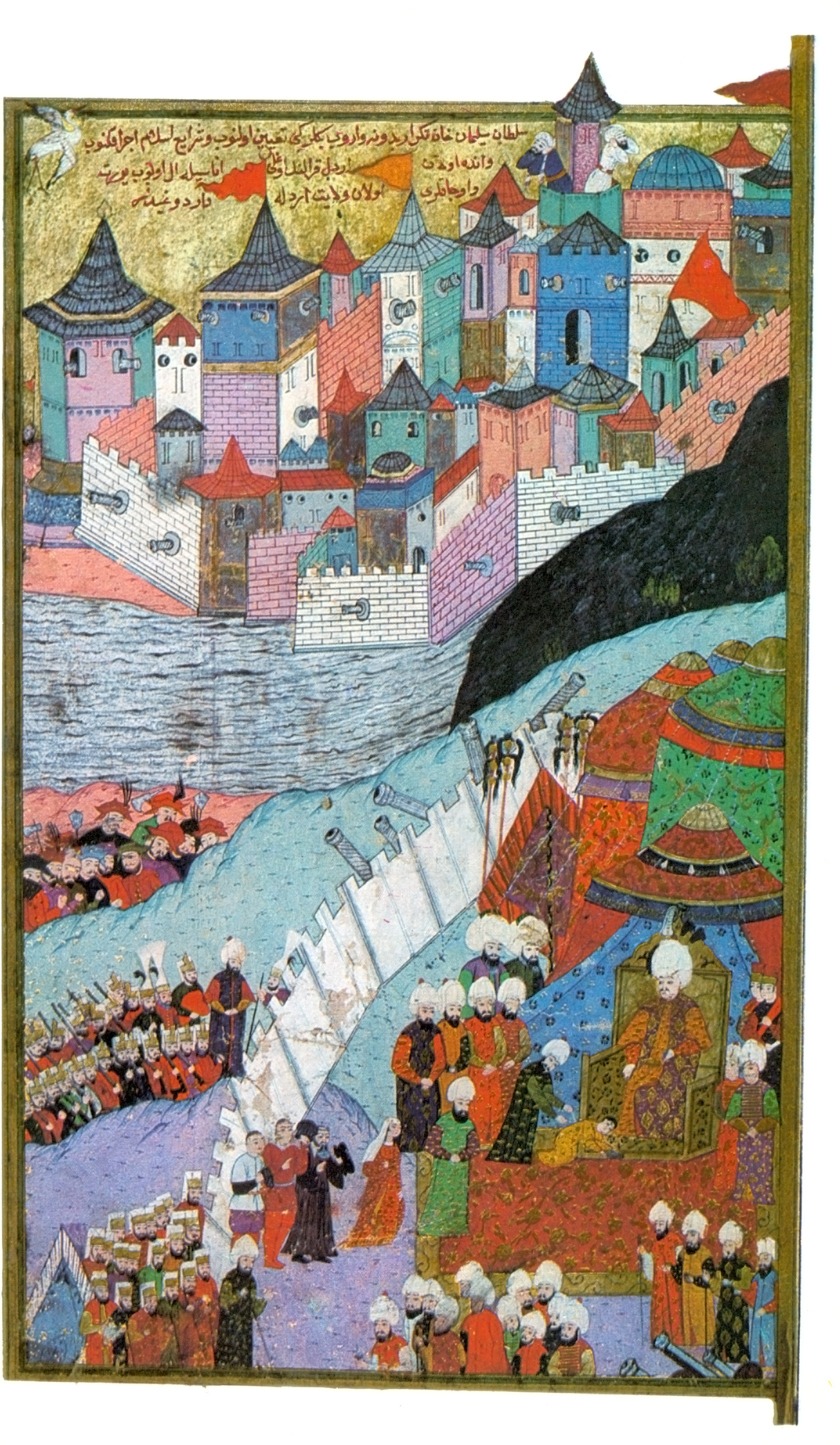
Suleiman I, Isabella Jagiellon and the child John Sigismund Zápolya in Buda.

The siege of Buda was a crucial Ottoman victory against Ferdinand and the Habsburgs. The victory allowed the occupation of central Hungary by the Ottomans for around 150 years, and is therefore comparable in importance to the Battle of Mohács in 1526.

Charles V learned about the defeat of his brother Ferdinand upon his arrival in Genoa on 8 September 1541. Thirsty for revenge, he departed for an expedition against Algiers, which also ended in a sound defeat for the Habsburgs.

Ferdinand would attempt to recover the cities of Buda and Pest in 1542, but he was repulsed by the Ottomans.

== See also ==
- Ottoman wars in Europe

== Bibliography ==
- Garnier, Edith. L'Alliance Impie. Editions du Felin, Paris 2008. ISBN 978-2-86645-678-8 Interview
- Pach, Zsigmond. History of Hungary, 1526–1686. Editor: R. Várkonyi, Ágnes. Academy Publisher, Budapest, 1985. ISBN 963-05-0929-6
- 1541-1542-ig tartó korszak eseményei Magyarországon
- Liptai Ervin. Military History of Hungary, 1. Zrínyi Military Publisher, Budapest, 1984. ISBN 963-326-320-4
