= Törökkoppány =

Törökkoppány Kopan (in Croatian)
- Village
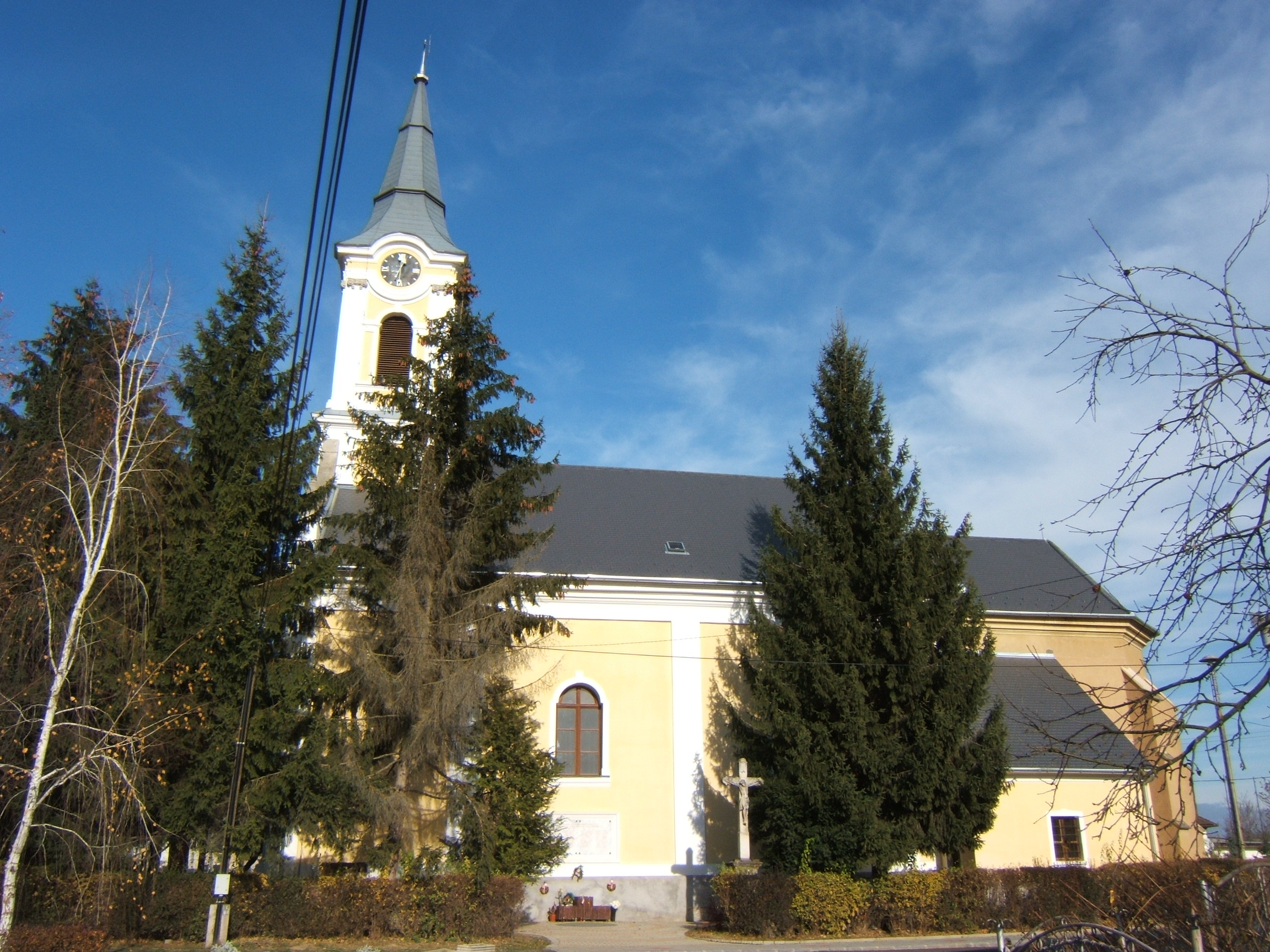
- Saint Catherine of Alexandria Church in Törökkoppány

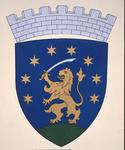
- Coat of arms

- Location of Somogy county in Hungary

- Location of Törökkoppány
- Coordinates: 46.60121°N 18.04907°E
- Country: Hungary
- Region: Southern Transdanubia
- County: Somogy
- District: Tab
- RC Diocese: Kaposvár

Area
  - Total: 25.8 km^{2} (10.0 sq mi)

Population (2017)
  - Total: 441
  - Density: 17.1/km^{2} (44.3/sq mi)
- Demonym(s): koppányi, törökkoppányi
- Time zone: UTC+1 (CET)
  - Summer (DST): UTC+2 (CEST)
- Postal code: 7285
- Area code: (+36) 84
- NUTS 3 code: HU232
- MP: Mihály Witzmann (Fidesz)
- Website: Törökkoppány Online

Törökkoppány (Croatian: Kopan) is a village in Somogy county, Hungary.

== Culture ==
The Hungarian folk song Kinyílt a rózsa, hajlik az ága was collected in 1923 in Törökkoppány by László Lajtha.
