= Ibrahim Pasha =

Ibrahim Pasha may refer to:

== Ottoman statesmen ==
- Çandarlı Ibrahim Pasha the Elder (died 1429), Ottoman statesman, grand vizier to Murad II
- Çandarlı Ibrahim Pasha the Younger (died 1499), Ottoman statesman, grand vizier to Bayezid II, grandson of Çandarlı Ibrahim Pasha
- Pargalı Ibrahim Pasha (1493–1536), Ottoman statesman, grand vizier to Suleiman the Magnificent (1523–1536), and governor of Egypt (1525)
- Damat Ibrahim Pasha (died 1601), Ottoman statesman, grand vizier to Ahmed II
- Maktul Hacı Ibrahim Pasha (died 1604), Ottoman statesman, governor of Egypt (1604), murdered in mutiny
- Ibrahim Pasha (Ottoman governor of Bosnia) (fl. 1610–1620), Ottoman governor of Bosnia
- Deli Ibrahim Pasha (fl. 1620–1630), Ottoman governor of Bosnia
- Defterdarzade Ibrahim Pasha (fl. 1639), Ottoman Minister of Finance
- Gabela Ibrahim Pasha (fl. 1645), Ottoman governor of Bosnia
- Ibrahim Pasha of Algiers (fl. 1657–1659), Ottoman governor of the Regency of Algiers
- Teşnak Ibrahim Pasha (fl. 1670), Ottoman governor of Bosnia
- Koca Arnaud Ibrahim Pasha (fl. 1670), Ottoman governor of Bosnia
- Bayburtlu Kara Ibrahim Pasha (died 1687), Ottoman statesman, grand vizier (1683–1685), and governor of Egypt (1669–1673)
- Ibrahim-pasha (fl. 1690–1700), Ottoman governor of Temeşvar Eyalet
- Hacı Ibrahim Pasha (fl. 1703), Ottoman governor of Bosnia
- Hadim Ibrahim Pasha (1473–1563), Bosnian Ottoman governor
- Hoca Ibrahim Pasha (fl. 1713), Ottoman grand vizier
- Moralı Ibrahim Pasha (died 1725), Ottoman statesman, governor of various provinces, including Egypt (1709–1710)
- Kabakulak Ibrahim Pasha (fl. 1730), Ottoman grand vizier, governor of Bosnia
- Nevşehirli Damat Ibrahim Pasha (1666–1730), Ottoman statesman, grand vizier during the Tulip Era
- Ibrahim Deli Pasha, 18th-century Ottoman governor of Damascus
- Ibrahim Pasha al-Azm (fl. 1740), Ottoman governor of Sidon Eyalet
- Hacı Ibrahim Pasha (died 1775), Ottoman statesman and governor of Egypt (1774–1775)
- Eğribozlu İbrahim Pasha (fl. 1758–1768), Ottoman Grand Admiral, see list of Kapudan Pashas
- Ibrahim Pasha of Berat, 18th-century ruler of the Pashalik of Berat
- Ibrahim Pasha Baban (fl. 1783–1784), Kurdish leader who founded Sulaymaniyah
- Ibrahim Pasha al-Halabi (fl. 1788–1789), Ottoman governor of Damascus
- Ibrahim Pasha Qataraghasi, Ottoman governor of Aleppo and Damascus
- Ibrahim Pasha of Scutari (died 1810), Pasha of Shkodër
- Ibrahim Pasha Milli (1843–1948), Ottoman era Kurdish chief of the Milan tribe
- Hilmi Ibrahim Pasha (fl. 1800–1820), Ottoman governor of Bosnia and Crete
- Ibrahim Sarim Pasha (1801–1853), Ottoman statesman
- Ibrahim Dervish Pasha (fl. 1872), Ottoman governor of Bosnia
- Ibrahim Edhem Pasha (1819–1893), Ottoman statesman, grand vizier to Abdulhamid II
- Ali Ibrahim Pasha, Egypt Minister of Education from 1879 to 1881
- Ibrahim Ilhami Pasha (1836–1860), son of Abbas I of Egypt
- Ibrahim Fehmi Pasha (1838–1896), Ottoman statesman
- Ibrahim Hakki Pasha (1862–1918), Ottoman statesman
- Nureddin Ibrahim Pasha (1873–1932), Ottoman and Turkish general

== Other Ottoman figures ==
- Ferik İbrahim Pasha (1815–1891), Ottoman painter

== Post-Ottoman figures ==
- Ibrahim Pasha of Egypt (1789–1848), Egyptian general and eldest son of Muhammad Ali of Egypt
- Yahya Ibrahim Pasha (1861–1936), Egyptian politician, Prime Minister 1923–1924
- Abdel Fattah Yahya Ibrahim Pasha (1876–1951), Egyptian politician, Prime Minister 1933–1934
- Ibrahim Abdel Hady Pasha (1896–1981), Egyptian politician, Prime Minister 1948–1949

== Places ==
- Ibrahim Pasha, Nicosia, Quarter or neighbourhood of Nicosia, Cyprus

== See also ==
- Hadim Ibrahim Pasha Mosque, mosque in Istanbul
- Ibrahim Pasha Mosque, mosque in Razgrad, Bulgaria
- Ibrahim Pasha Mosque, Rhodes
- Ibrahim Pasha Palace, palace in Istanbul
