= Hersekli =

Hersekli, meaning "of Herzegovina" or "Herzegovinian" in Turkish, relating to the Ottoman Sanjak of Herzegovina, was an epithet used for Ottoman nobility. It may refer to:

- Hersekzade Ahmed Pasha–Hersekli Ahmed Paşa (1459–1517), Ottoman Grand Vizier
- Telli Hasan Pasha–Hersekli Hasan Paşa (1530–1593), Ottoman governor and general
- Osman Pasha the Bosnian–Hersekli Osman Paşa (fl. 1676–85), Ottoman governor
