= List of Ottoman governors of Bosnia =

Bosnia became part of the Ottoman Empire after 1454. The Ottoman government appointed sanjak-beys as governors of Bosnia. The following is a list of Ottoman governors of the Bosnian sanjak, eyalet, and vilayet within Ottoman Empire.

== Early period ==
Name	Reign	Notes
Bosnia as part of the Sanjak of Üsküp
Ishak Bey (İshak Beğ)	1463/64	According to Turkish sources, Ishak Bey was the first governor in Bosnia.
Sanjak of Bosnia
Minnetoğlu Mehmed Bey or Nasuh Bey (Mehmed-beg Minetović; Nesuh-beg)	1463–1464 (Minnetoğlu) or 1464/65 (Nasuh Bey)	First Ottoman governor of Bosnia titled sanjak-bey. According to Turkish historians (1998), "Nasuh Bey" was the successor to Ishak Bey in 1664/65, but Yugoslav Bosnian historian E. Smailbegović (1986) claims that it was "Mehmed-beg Minetović".
Isa Bey Ishaković (İshakoğlu İsa Beğ)	1465/66–	
Ilyas Bey (İlyas Beğ)	1470/71	
Sinan Bey (Sinan Beğ)	1471/72–73	
Davud Bey (Davud Beğ)	1473/74	
İskender Bey (İskender Beğ)	1475/76–80	
Yahya Bey (Yahya Beğ)	1480–83	
Yakub Bey (Yakub Beğ)	1483–85	
İskender Bey (2nd term)	1485–86	
Sinan Bey (2nd term)	1486	
Yunus Bey (Yunus Beğ)	1486–89	
Mustafa Bey (?)	1489–92	
Firuz Bey	1504–?	
Yahyapaşazade Bali Bey (Bali-beg Jahjapašić)	1521–15 September 1521	
Gazi Husrev Bey (1st term) (Gazi Hüsrev Bey, Gazi Husrev-beg)	15 September 1521 – 1525	
Gazi Hasan Bey (Gazi Hasan Bey, Gazi Hasan-beg)	1525–1526	
Gazi Husrev Bey (2nd term)	1526–1534	(2nd term)
Ulama-paša	1534–1536	
Gazi Husrev Bey (3rd term)	1536–1541	(3rd term)
Sofu Hadım Ali Pasha	1552 – April 1559	
Sokollu Mustafa Pasha (Sokollu Mustafa Paşa, Mustafa-paša Sokolović)	1563/64 – 1566	
Sokollu Mehmed Pasha (Sokollu Mehmet Bey, Mehmed-beg Sokolović)	1566 – 1568	Member of Sokolović family.
Ferhad Bey Desisalić (Ferhad Bey, Ferhad-beg Desisalić)	1568 – 25 June 1568	
Mehmed Bey Sokolović (2nd term)	25 June 1568 – 1574	(2nd term)
Ferhad Pasha Sokolović (Ferhad Bey Sokollu, Ferhad-beg Sokolović)	1574–1580	Member of Sokolović family.
Hüseyin Pasha Boljanić (Bodur Hüseyin Paşa, Husein-paša Boljanić)	After 1569	

== Bosnia Eyalet ==
Name	Reign	Notes
Bosnia Eyalet
Ferhad Pasha Sokolović (Sokollu Ferhat Paşa)	1580–1587	
Nasuhzade Kara Ali Pasha (Nasuhzade Ali Paşa)	1587–1588	
Şahsuvar Pasha	1588	
Ferhad Pasha Sokolović (restored)	1588/89–1590	
Halil Pasha	1590	
Sofi Mehmed Pasha	1590/91–1592/93	
Hasan Pasha (Herceg gazi Hasan-paša)	1592/93	
Hasan Pasha Predojević	1593–1594	
Hüseyin Pasha Boljanić	1594–1595	
Ismail Pasha	1595–1596	
Apardi Pasha	1596	
Hüdaverdi Pasha	1596–1597	
Idris Pasha	1597	
Hasan-paša Tir	1597–1598	
Ahmed-paša Dugalić	1598–1599	
Dervish Pasha (Derviš-paša Bajezidagić)	1599–1600	
Sofi Sinan Pasha	1600–1601	
Tatar Mehmed Pasha	1601	
Celali Deli Hasan (Hasan Dželalija)	1601–1602	
Husrev Pasha	1603–1606	
Gurşci Mehmed Pasha	1606–1607	
Sofi Sinan Pasha (restored)	1607–1608	
Kurşuncizade Mustafa Pasha	1608–1609	
Ibrahim Pasha	1609–1610	
Kurşuncizade Mustafa Pasha (restored)	1610–1612	
Karakaş Mehmed Pasha	1612–1613	
Iskender Pasha	1613–1614	
Abdulbaki Pasha	1614	
Iskender Pasha (restored)	1614–1620	
Kurşuncizade Mustafa Pasha (restored)	1620	
Ibrahim Pasha (restored)	1621	
Baltacı Mehmed Pasha	1621–1622	
Bajram Pasha	1622–1623	
Deli Ibrahim Pasha	1623–1625	
Bajram Pasha (restored)	1625	
Gazi Mustafa Pasha	1625–1626	
Arnaut Ali Pasha	1626–1627	
Bosnak Ebu Bekir Pasha	1627–1628	
Abaza Mehmed Pasha	1628–1631	
Hersekli Murat Pasha	1631	
Hasan Pasha	1631–1632	
Arnaut Mustafa Pasha	1632	
Hasan Pasha (restored)	1632–1633	
Suleiman Pasha (Süleyman Paşa)	1633–34	
Deli Ibrahim Pasha (2nd time)	1634–1635	
Mostarli Salih Pasha (Mostarlı Sâlih Paşa)	1635–1637	
Mehmed Pasha (Mehmed Paşa)	1637–1639	
Bosnali Şahin Hasan Pasha (Bosnalı Şahin Paşa)	1639–1640	
Kurşuncu Mehmed Pasha (Kurşuncu Mehmed Paşa)	1640–1641	
Deli Hüseyin Pasha (Deli Hüseyin Paşa)	1641–1643	
Ahmed Pasha (Ahmed Paşa)	1643–1644	
Bosnali Varvar Ali Pasha (Bosnalı Varvar Ali Paşa)	1644–1645	
Ömer Pasha (Ömer Paşa)	1645	
Gabelali Ibrahim Pasha (Gabelalı Ibrahim Paşa)	1645–1647	
Tekeli Mustafa Pasha (Tekeli Mustafa Paşa)	1647–1648	
Derviş Mehmed Pasha	1648–1649	
Sarhoşoğlu Hasan Pasha	1649–1650	
Defterdarzade Mehmed Pasha	1650–1651	
Bosnali Fazli Pasha	1651–1652	
Abaza Siyavuş Pasha I	1652–1653	
Bosnali Fazli Pasha (restored)	1653–1655	
Sadriali Suleiman Pasha	1655	
Topal Hasan Pasha	1655–1656	
Sejid Ahmed Pasha	1655–1656	
Melek Ahmed Pasha	1658–1659	
Servazad gazi Ali Pasha	1659–1663	
Bosnali Ismail Pasha	1663–1664	
Arnaud Mustafa Pasha	1664–1665	
Bosnali Muharem Pasha	1665	
Sohrab Mehmed Pasha	1666	
Köse Ali Pasha	1666–1667	
Teşnak Ibrahim Pasha	1667–1670	
Teftišdži Mehmed Pasha	1670–1672	
Canpolad Husein Pasha	1672	
Koca Arnaud Ibrahim Pasha	1672–1674	
Mehmed Pasha	1674–1676	
Hacı Ebu Bekir Pasha	1676–1677	
Defterdar Cebeci Ahmed Pasha	1677–1678	
Koca Arnaud Ibrahim Pasha (restored)	1678	
Koca Halil Pasha	1678–1679	
Defterdar Cebeci Ahmed Pasha	1679–1680	
Abdurrahman Abdi Pasha the Albanian	1680–1682	
Hizir Pasha	1682–1684	
Ahmed Pasha Osmanpašić	1684–1685	
Hersekli Osman Pasha	1685	
Kunduk Ahmed Pasha	1685–1686	
Abaza Siyavuş Pasha	1686	
Mehmed Pasha Atlagić	1686–1687	
Gazi Topal Husein Pasha	1687–1690	
Büyük Cafer Pasha	1690–1691	
Boşnak Gazi Mehmed Pasha	1691–1697	
Boşnak Sari Ahmed Pasha	1697–1698	
Daltaban gazi Mustafa Pasha	1698–1699	
Köse Halil Pasha	1699–1702	
Boşnak Seyfullah Pasha	1702	
Hacı Ibrahim Pasha	1703–1704	
Sirke Osman Pasha	1705	
Mehmed Pasha	1705–1707	
Veli Mehmed Pasha	1707	
Mustafa Pasha of Banja Luka	1708	
Boşnak Seyfullah Pasha (restored)	1709–1710	
Kara Yilan Ali Pasha	1711	
Sari Ahmed Pasha	1712–1713	
Arnaud Ali Pasha	1713	
Köprülü Numan Pasha	1714	
Boşnak Sari Mustafa Pasha	1715	
Yusuf Pasha	1716	
Moralı Ibrahim Pasha	1716	
Şabad Ahmed Pasha	1717	
Kara Mustafa Pasha	1717	
Köprülü Numan Pasha (restored)	1717	
Osman Defterdar Pasha	1718–1719	
Topal Osman Pasha	1720	
Muhsinoğlu Abdullah Pasha (first term)	1721–1726	
Boşnak Ahmed Pasha Rustampašić	1727–1728	
Kabakulak İbrahim Paşa	1729–1730	
Sikre Osman Pasha	1731	
Muhsinoğlu Abdullah Pasha (second term)	1732–1735	
Hekimoğlu Ali Pasha	1736–1739	
Muhsinoğlu Abdullah Pasha (restored)	1740	
Gazi Ajvaz Mehmed Pasha	1741	
Jegen Mehmed Pasha	1742–1744	
Hekimoğlu Ali Pasha (restored)	1745	
Bostanci Suleyman Pasha	1745–1746	
Hekimoğlu Ali Pasha (restored)	1746–1747	
Muhsinoğlu Abdullah Pasha (restored)	1748	
Ebubekir Pasha	1749	
Seyyid Abdullah Pasha	1750–1751	
Köprülü Hacı Ahmed Pasha	1751	
Boşnak Hacı Mehmed Pasha Foçak	1752–1754	
Kamil Ahmed Pasha	1755–1757	
Boşnak Hacı Mehmed Pasha Foçak (restored)	1758–1762	
Maldovanzade Ali Pasha	1763	
Aga Mehmed Pasha	1764	
Köprülü Hacı Ahmed Pasha (restored)	1765	
Nişli Mehmed Pasha	1765–1766	
Silahdar Mehmed Pasha	1766–1769	
Muhsinzade Mehmed Pasha	1770–1771	
Topaloğlu Osman Pasha	1772	
Dagistani Ali Pasha	1773	
Alvazade Ali Pasha	1774	
Silahdar Mehmed Pasha (restored)	1775	
Dagistani Ali Pasha (restored)	1776–1777	
Silahdar Mehmed Pasha (restored)	1778	
Seyyid Mustafa Pasha	1779	
Boşnak Defterdar Abdulla Pasha	1780–1784	
Haseki Seyyid Mehmed Pasha (Ajdosli Kara Haseki Sejji Mehmed-paša)	10–14 May 1785	
Katib Ismail Pasha (Ismail-paša)	14 May–17 July 1785	
Morali Ahmed Pasha (Morali Ahmed-paša)	7 September 1785–2 March 1786	
Selim Sirri Pasha (Selim Sirri-paša)	10 April 1786–late December 1787	
Agribozlu Ebubekir Pasha (Agribozlu Ebu Bekir-paša)	30 December 1787–end of April 1789	
Arslan Mehmed Pasha (Arslan Mehmed-paša)	25 May–15 October 1789	
Miralem Mehmed Pasha (Miralem Mehmed-paša)	25 November–18 December 1789	
Kayserili Hacı Salih Pasha (Hadži Salih-paša)	25 February 1790–beginning of January 1791	
Koca Yusuf Pasha (Jusuf-paša)	4 February–9 March 1791	
Kayserili Hacı Salih Pasha (2nd term)	9 March 1791–25 August 1792	
Husamuddin Pasha (Husamuddin-paša)	7 December 1792–21 June 1797	
Perişan Mustafa Pasha (Perišan Mustafa-paša)	21 June 1796–March/early April 1798	
Vanli Mehmed Pasha (Vanli Mehmed-paša)	August 1799–September 1801	
Bekir Pasha (Ebubekir-paša, Bećir-paša)	September 1801–6 January 1805	
Mustafa Pasha Ismailpašić (Mustafa-paša Ismailpašić)	6 January 1805–25 March 1806	
Koca Hüsrev Mehmed Pasha	9 April 1806–29 January 1808	
Ibrahim Hilmi Pasha	29 January 1809–13 March 1813	
Darendeli Ali Pasha (Darendeli Silahdar Ali-paša)	13 March 1813–30 March 1815	
Hurshid Pasha (Huršid Ahmed-paša)	30 March–28 October 1815	
Suleyman Pasha Skopljak (Sulejman-paša Skopljak)	28 October 1815–24 January 1818	
Dervish Mustafa Pasha Makraneci (Derviš Mustafa-paša Makranedžija)	9 February 1818–27 August 1819	
Mehmed Rushdi Pasha (Mehmed Rušdi-paša)	27 August–8 December 1819	
Klisi Ali Celaleddin Pasha (Klisi Ali Dželaluddin-paša)	8 December 1819–29 November 1822	
Şerif Sirri Selim Pasha (Šerif Sirri Selim-paša)	29 November 1822–12 May 1826	
Belenli Haci Mustafa Pasha (Belenli Hadži Mustafa-paša)	14 May–December 1826	
Abdurrahman Pasha (Abdurahman-paša)	22 December 1826–18 August 1828	
Morali Namik Pasha (Morali Namik-paša)	18 August 1828–27 June 1831	
Vidinli Ibrahim Pasha (Vidinli Ibrahim-paša)	1–20 August 1831	
Husein Gradaščević	October 1831–5 June 1832	
Mahmud Hamdi Pasha (Mahmud Hamdi-paša)	5 June 1832–24 June 1833	
Davud Pasha (Davud-paša)	24 June 1833–13 August 1835	
Mehmed Sali Vecihi Pasha (Mehmed Sali Vedžihi-paša)	13 August 1835–28 October 1840	
Mehmed Husrev Pasha Samakovli (Mehmed Husrev-paša Samakovlija)	28 October 1840–6 November 1843	
Muhendis Mehmed Kamil Pasha (Muhendis Mehmed Kamil-paša)	6 November 1843–11 November 1844	
Osman Nuri Pasha (Osman Nuri-paša)	11 November 1844–1 November 1845	
Hadji Halil Kamili Pasha (Hadži Halil Kamili-paša)	1 November 1845–4 July 1847	
Çengelzade Mehmed Tahir Pasha (Čengel-zade Mehmed Tahir-paša)	4 July 1847–20 May 1850	
Çerkez Hafiz Mehmed Pasha (Čerkez Hafiz Mehmed-paša)	1 June–November 1850	
Hayreddin Pasha (Hajruddin-paša)	November 1850–March 1852	
Giritli Mustafa Pasha (Giritli Mustafa-paša-zade Velijuddin-paša)	8 March–June 1852	
Hurshid Mehmed Pasha (Huršid Mehmed-paša)	14 September 1852–21 July 1856	
Raşid Mehmed Pasha (Rešid Mehmed-paša)	26 October 1856–June 1858	
Kani Mehmed Pasha (Kani Mehmed-paša)	1858–1858	
Arnavut Mehmed Akif Pasha	1858–1859	
Mehmed Kani Pasha	1859	
Osman Mazhar Pasha	1859–1861	
Sherif Osman Pasha	1861–1868	

== Bosnia Vilayet ==
Name	Reign	Notes
Bosnia Vilayet
Omer Favzi Pasha	1868	
Sherif Osman Pasha	1868–1869	
Sefvet Pasha	1869–1871	
Arnavut Mehmed Akif Pasha	1871	
Mehmed Asim Pasha	1871	
Ibrahim Dervish Pasha	1872	
Mehmed Rashid Pasha	1872	
Mustafa Asim Pasha	1872	
Mustafa Pasha	1872	
Mustafa Asim Pasha	1872	
Arnavut Mehmed Akif Pasha	1873	
Ibrahim Dervish Pasha	1873	
Ahmed Hamdi Pasha	1874	
Mehmed Rauf Pasha bin Abdi Pasha	1874	
Ibrahim Pasha	1875	
??	1876–1877	
Ahmed Mazhar Pasha	1878	
Habsburg administration (1878–1918)

== Sources ==
- Bašagić, Safvet-beg (1900). Kratka uputa u prošlost Bosne i Hercegovine, od g. 1463-1850. Vlastita naklada.
- "[Prilozi]". Prilozi. 32–33. Sarajevo: Institut za istoriju Sarajevo: –284–. 2003. ISSN 0350-1159.
- Öztuna, Yılmaz (1979). Başlangıcından zamanımıza kadar büyük türkiye tarihi: Türkiye'nin siyasî, medenî, kültür, teşkilât ve san'at tarihi. Vol. 12. Ötüken Yayınevi.
- Küçük, Mustafa (2003) [1998]. "Başbakanlık Osmanlı Arşivi Belgelerine Göre: Bosna-Hersek'teki Osmanlı Mirası". Prilozi, Za Orijentalnu Filologue. 51. Sarajevo: 163–196.
- Muvekkit, Salih Sidki Hadžihuseinović (1999a). Povijest Bosne (Tarihi Diyari Bosna). Vol. 1. El Kalem, Sarajevo.
- Muvekkit, Salih Sidki Hadžihuseinović (1999b). Povijest Bosne (Tarihi Diyari Bosna). Vol. 2. El Kalem, Sarajevo.
