= Siege of Krupa =

Siege in the Ottoman–Habsburg wars of the 16th century

- Part of the Ottoman wars in Europe; Ottoman–Croatian Wars; Habsburg–Ottoman war of 1565–1568
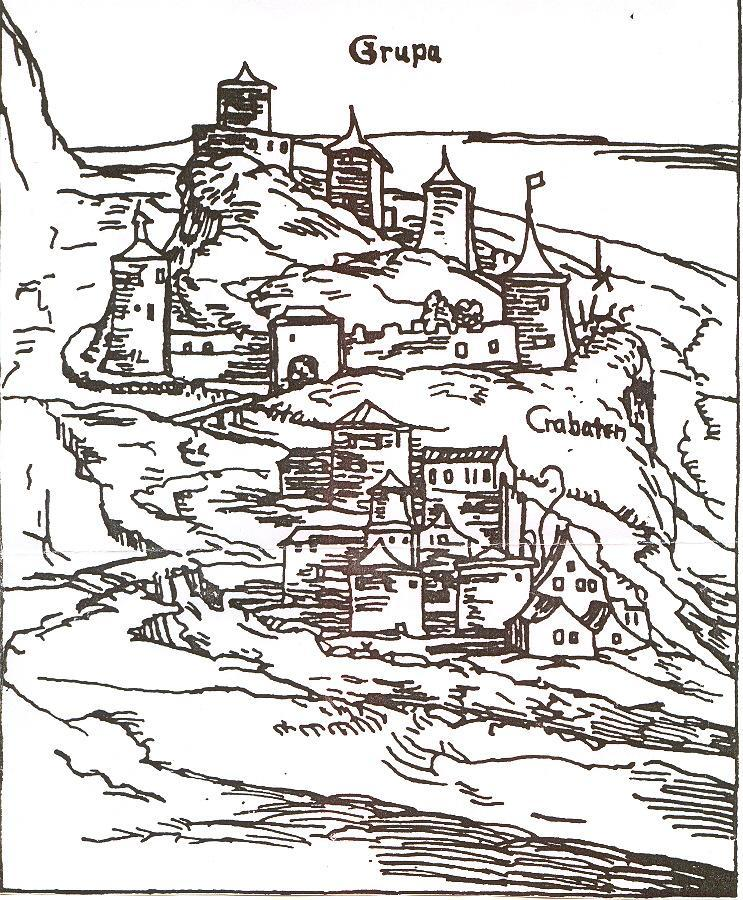
- Krupa in 1530
Date	4–23 June 1565
Location	Krupa, Kingdom of Croatia, Habsburg monarchy
Result	Ottoman victory
Territorial changes	Krupa captured by the Ottomans

Belligerents
Ottoman Empire	Habsburg Monarchy: Kingdom of Croatia

Commanders and leaders
Mustafa Pasha Sokolović	Matija Bakić †

Strength
12,000	28

Casualties and losses
Light	Entire garrison

The siege of Krupa (Croatian: Opsada Krupe) was fought on 3–23 June 1565 between the Ottoman forces of Mustafa Pasha Sokolović, sanjakbey of Bosnia, and the Germanic and Croatian forces led by Matija Bakić. The siege was a part of the Croatian–Ottoman wars and Ottoman–Habsburg wars between the Ottoman Empire and the Habsburg monarchy.

== Prelude ==
The death of Hungarian and Croatian king Ferdinand I of Habsburg in 1564, annihilated the Habsburg-Ottoman armistice signed in 1562 for the duration of nine years. As a pretext for a new campaign, Suleiman the Magnificent used the ongoing civil war in Hungary, between Transylvanian prince John Sigismund Zápolya (pretender for the crown of Hungary and Ottoman vassal) and Ferdinand's son and new king, Maximilian.

== Siege ==
=== Krupa fortress ===
Location of Krupa in modern Bosnia.

Krupa castle (first mentioned in the 13th century), on a cliff above the river Una, had one large and two minor round towers connected with bulwarks. Under the castle was a large settlement, fortified with a wall with two towers (later adapted for artillery) and a gatehouse. Until 1456, it was the property of Croatian nobility, and after it passed to the king.

=== Former sieges ===
After the fall of Bosnia in 1463, it became one of the foremost Croatian forts in the way of Ottoman raids towards Bihać which would also eventually fall in 1592. The first siege (in 1509) by 2,000 Ottomans was beaten back, as well as the 4-month siege in 1522-1523 (by 2,000 Ottoman cavalry and 5,000 infantry).

=== Final siege ===
In 1565, as a prelude to a full-scale Ottoman–Habsburg war, Mustafa Pasha Sokolović, sanjakbey of Bosnia, attacked the Croatian frontier in the summer of 1565 and besieged Krupa fortress. A small garrison (only 28 men), led by Croatian nobleman Matija Bakić, resisted valiantly for 20 days. The last 8 defenders sallied out of the fort and fell, fighting the overwhelming Ottoman forces on 23 June 1565.

== Aftermath ==
Further intrusion into Croatia by Mustafa Pasha Sokolović were beaten back by Croatian ban Petar Erdody in the Battle of Obreška.

== Bibliography ==
- Vojna enciklopedija (1970–76), 10 volumes, Vojno izdavački zavod Beograd, book 1, p. 755, article Bosanska Krupa (in Serbo-Croatian)
