= Siege of Esztergom (1685) =

Ottoman-Holy Roman Empire battle

- Part of the Great Turkish War
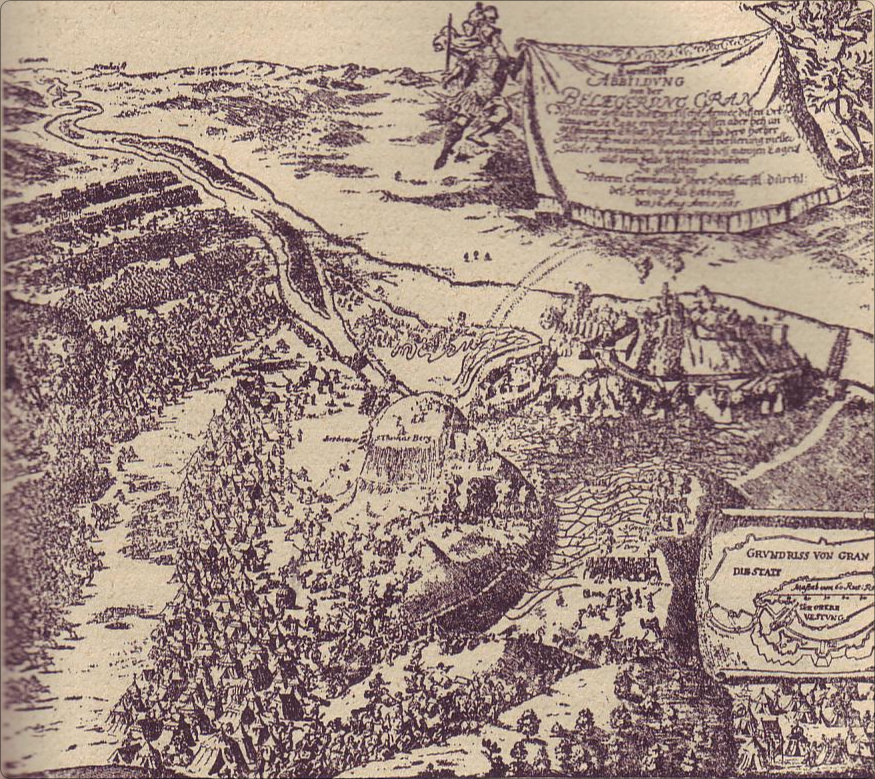
- Siege of Esztergom (1685)
Date	August 16, 1685
Location	Esztergom, Ottoman Empire
Result	Holy Roman Empire victory

Belligerents
Holy Roman Empire	Ottoman Empire

Commanders and leaders
(Holy Roman Empire) Charles of Lorraine	(Ottoman Empire) Ibrahim Pasha (Ottoman Empire) Osman Pasha †

Strength
60,000	42,000

Casualties and losses
100	1,500

The siege of Esztergom was a military conflict on August 16, 1685, between the armies of the Holy Roman Empire, particularly Imperial Austrian troops, and the Ottoman Empire during the Great Turkish War. The siege near today's town of Esztergom ended in defeat for the Ottomans.

== Background ==
The war began in 1683 with an offensive by the Ottoman army against Vienna. After this was defeated in the Vienna on September 12, 1683, the Imperial army and its allied Polish troops began a counteroffensive to conquer Hungary. After the Victory at Párkány, on October 27, 1683, Esztergom was forced to surrender after a short siege. The year 1684 was also successful for the Imperial family. In the summer of 1685 they went to the Neuhäusel under their general Charles of Lorraine. In order to distract the Imperial army, the Ottoman army under the Serasker Melek Ibrahim Pasha made his own advance against Esztergom. Charles of Lorraine therefore only left an observation corps in front of Neuhäusel and marched with his main army to relieve Esztergom.

== Siege ==
When the enemy army approached, the Ottoman Serasker (Minister of War), who commanded the troops, lifted the siege of Esztergom in order to be strong enough for the expected field siege. Since August 11, both armies had been facing each other in battle formation on the left bank of the Danube. Charles of Lorraine finally faked a retreat on August 16 and thus tempted the Ottomans to attack. This was initially directed primarily against the right wing of the Imperials, where Charles of Lorraine himself had to intervene to reorganize his troops. After the center had also repelled an Ottoman attack, Charles of Lorraine gave the order to counterattack. The Regimenters moved forward and only opened fire from a very short distance away. They also brought up cannons, which opened a devastating grapeshot fire against the Ottoman soldiers. After a final offensive push by the Ottomans against the Imperial left wing, commanded by the Bavarian Elector Max Emanuel failed, they began to flee the battlefield. The Imperial forces had to forego persecution because their troops were too exhausted.

== Aftermath ==
After the Ottoman field army was defeated, the cities besieged by the Imperial forces could no longer count on relief. Neuhäusel fell on August 19, soon afterwards also the places Eperies, Kaschau, and Tokaj. The Sultan therefore had Emeric Thököly arrested in October and began the first peace negotiations with the emperor, however remained unsuccessful.

== Sources ==
- NÉGYESI LAJOS AZ 1685. ÉVI TÁTI CSATA
- Bodart, G. (1908) Militär-historisches Kriegs-Lexikon (1618-1905).
- Max von Turek: Türkenkriege der Österreicher, in: Bernhard von Poten (Hrsg.): Handwörterbuch der gesamten Militärwissenschaften, Bd. 9, Velhagen & Klasing, Leipzig/ Bielfeld 1880, S. 187–198.
- Paul Wentzcke: Feldherr des Kaisers – Leben und Taten Herzog Karls V. von Lothringen, Koehler & Amelang, Leipzig 1943.
