= Rudas Baths =

Thermal bath in Budapest, Hungary

Coordinates: 47°29′20.73″N 19°2′52.32″E

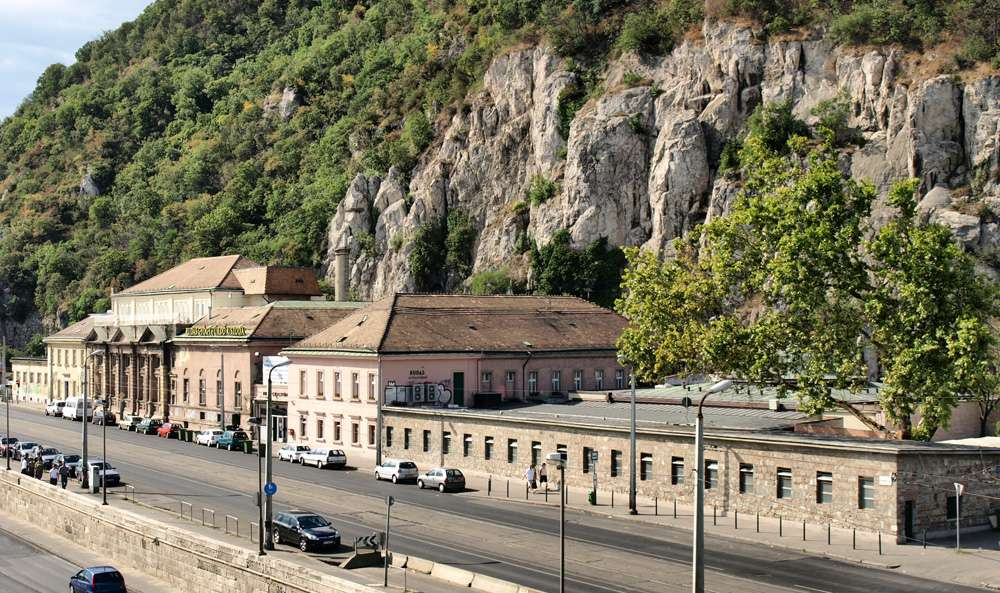
Rudas Bath at the foot of Gellért Hill.

Rudas Bath or Rudas fürdő (Hungarian pronunciation: [ˈrudɒʃ ˈfyrdøː]) is a thermal bath in Budapest, Hungary which is claimed to have medicinal properties. It was founded in 1571/1572 during the time of Ottoman rule. To date, it retains many of the key elements of a Hammam, exemplified by its Ottoman dome and octagonal pool. It is located at Döbrentei tér 9 on the Buda side of Erzsébet Bridge. The bath has six therapy pools and one swimming pool where the temperature is in between 10 and 42 °C (50 and 108 °F). The components of slightly radioactive thermal water includes sulfate, calcium, magnesium, bicarbonate and a significant amount of fluoride ion. A sight-seeing brochure claims the water can help to treat degenerative joint illnesses, chronic and sub-acute joint inflammations, vertebral disk problems, neuralgia and lack of calcium in the bone system.

The baths were commissioned by Sokollu Mustafa Pasha who was the governor (beylerbey) of Buda between 1566 and 1578. This is inscribed in Hungarian in the baths, on a stone standing atop the Juve spring, which is believed by locals to have a rejuvenating effect on people. As Sokollu Mustafa Pasha was the nephew of Grand Vizier Sokollu Mehmed Pasha, Rudas baths echoes the design and dimensions of similar monumental Ottoman constructions in Istanbul.

The baths were used as a location for the opening scene of the 1988 action movie Red Heat, starring Arnold Schwarzenegger and James Belushi. An orgy scene was filmed in 1997 in the octagonal pool for the adult movie Concupiscence.

It re-opened at the beginning of 2006, after a comprehensive renovation of its interior.

== Gallery ==
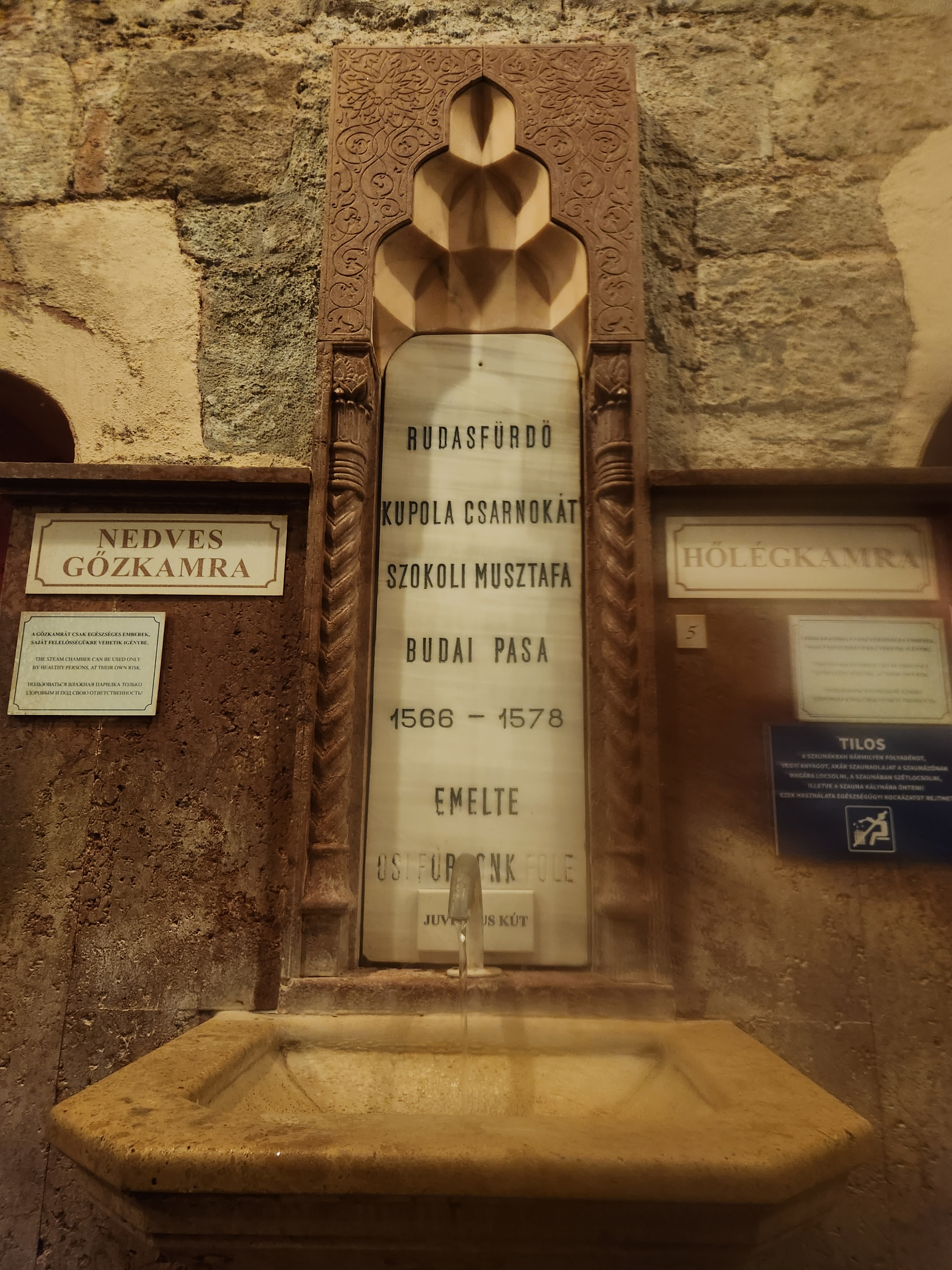
Foundation inscription

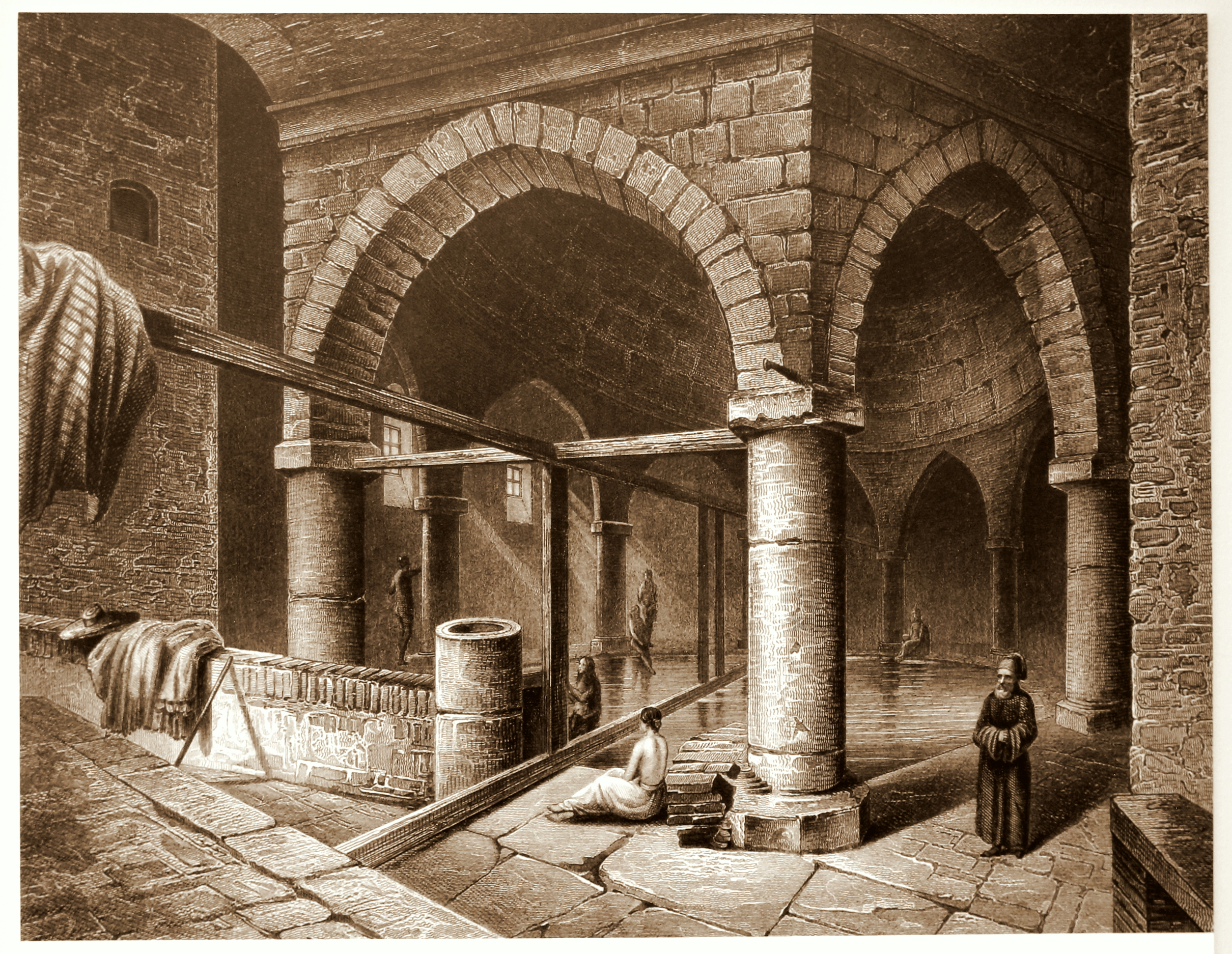
Turkish times

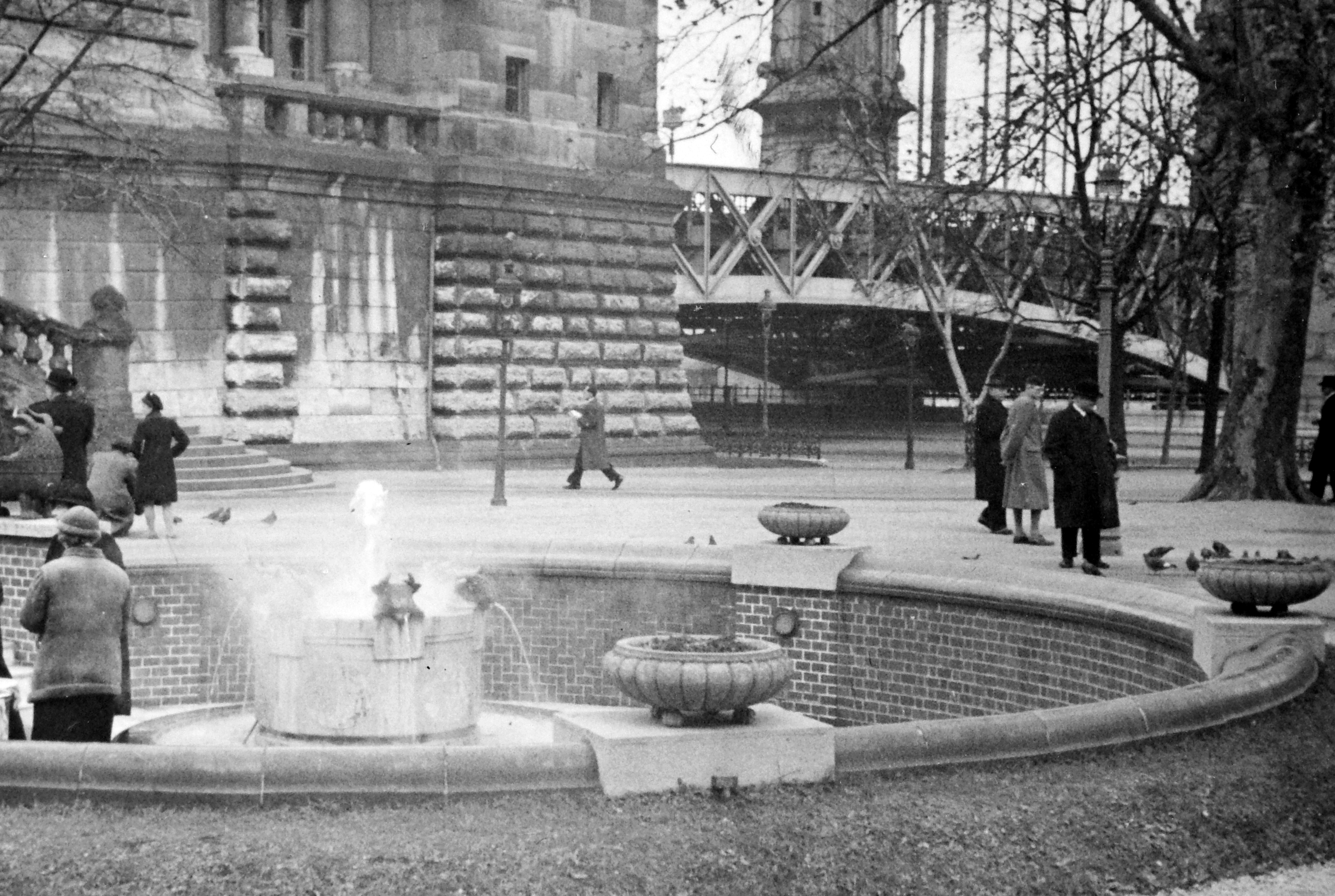
Hungária drinking fountain

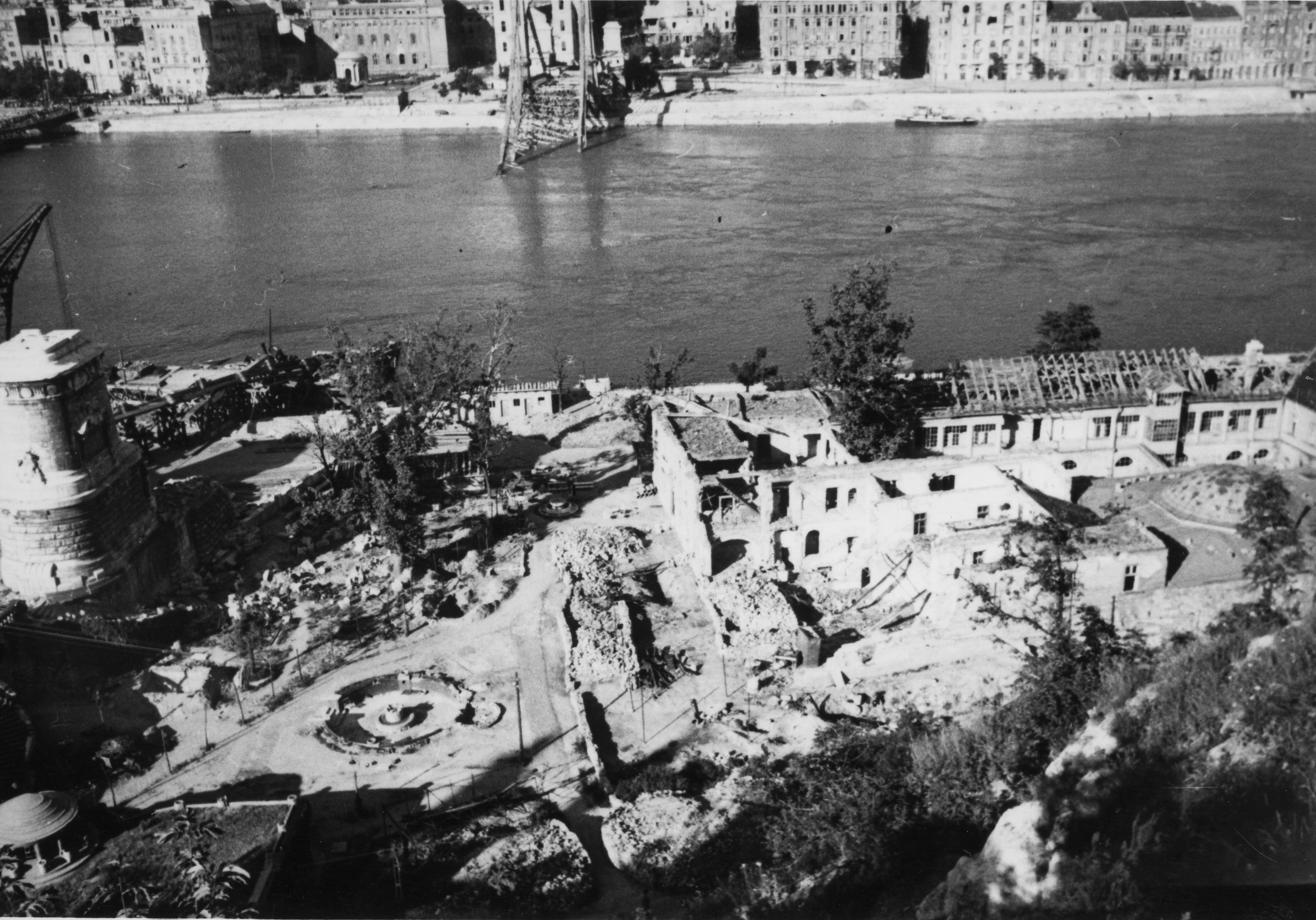
After world war 2

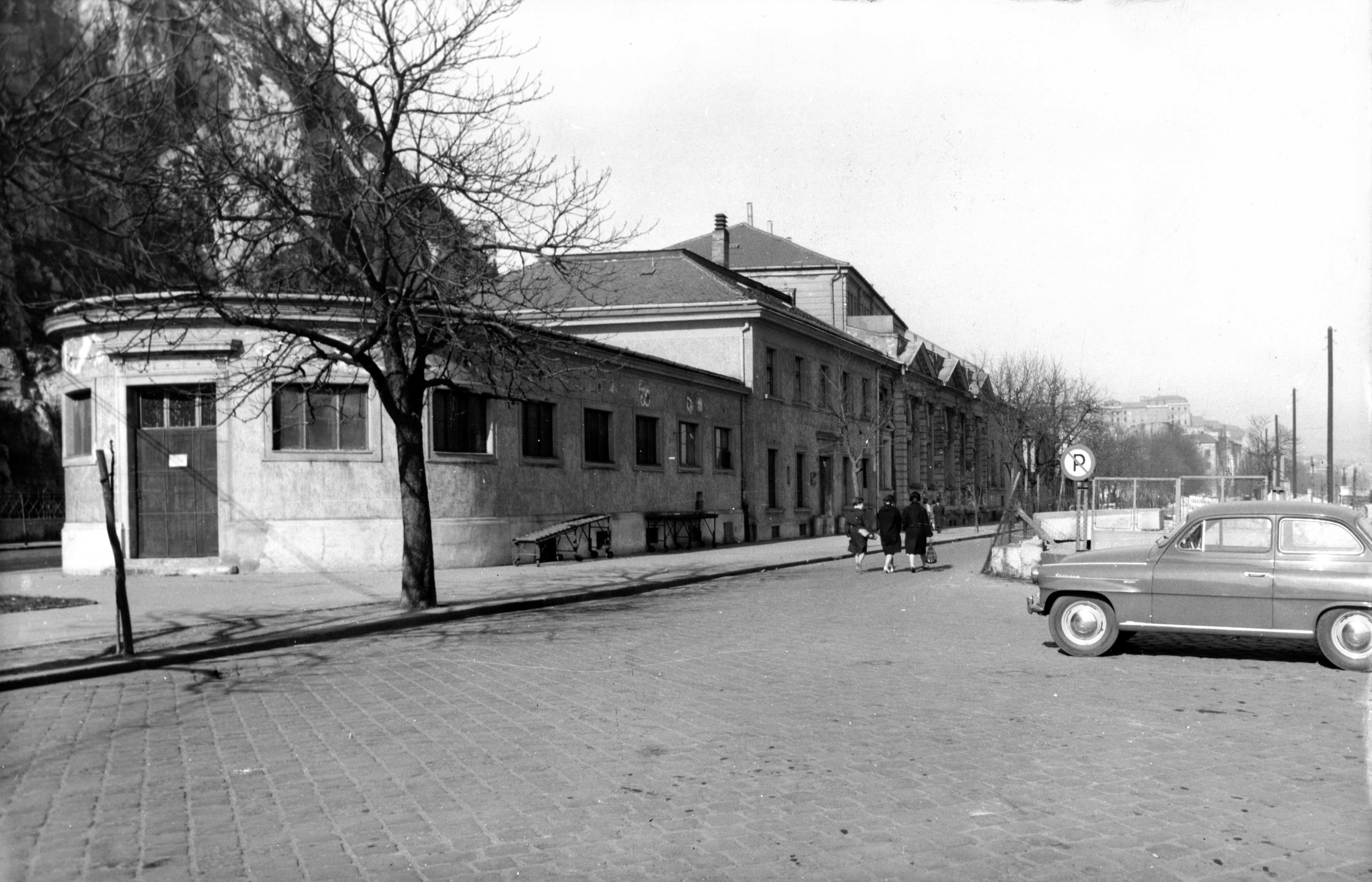
1960's

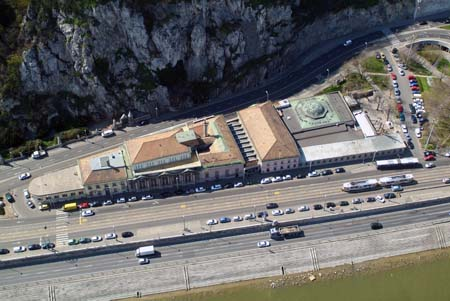

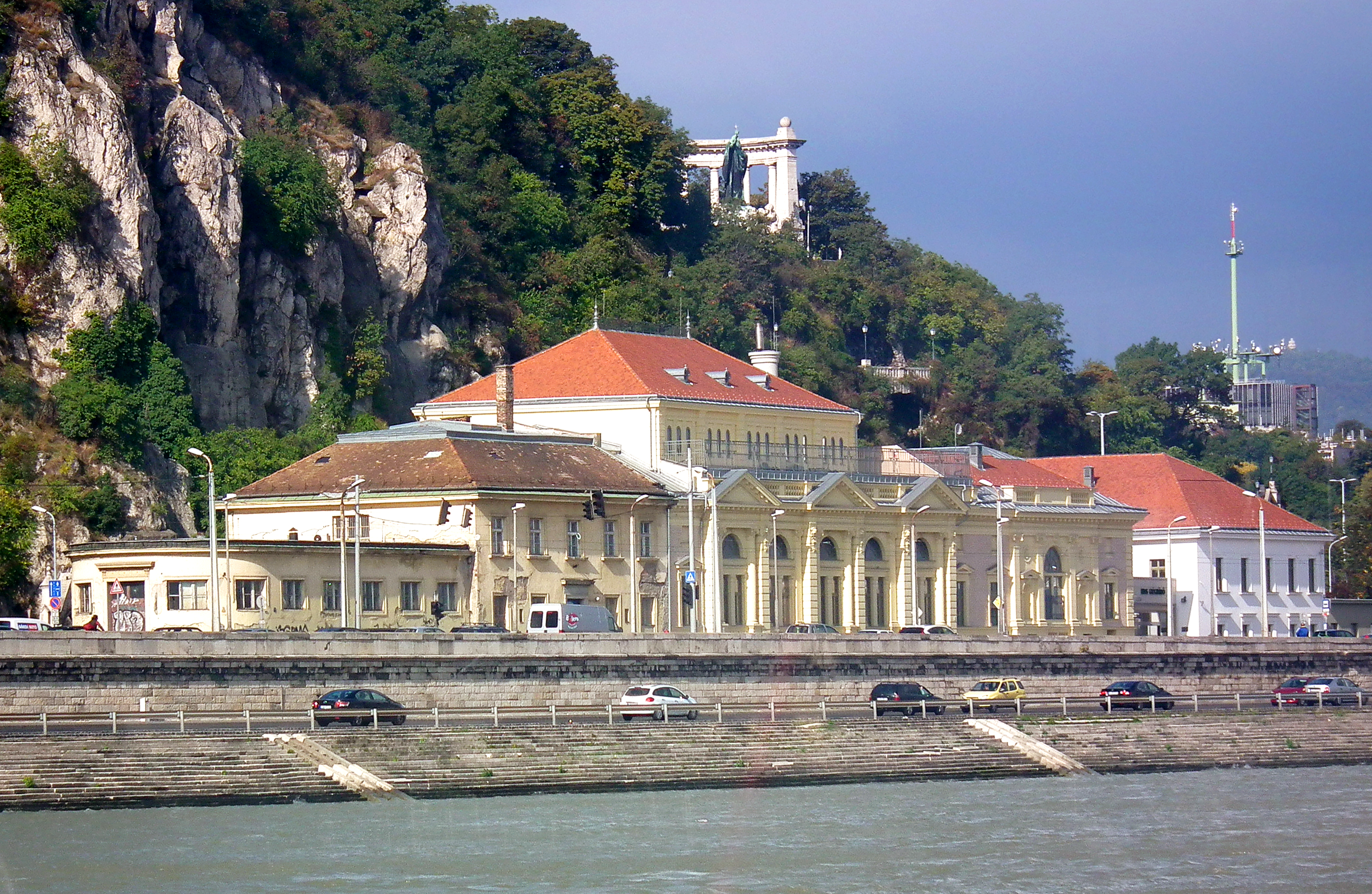

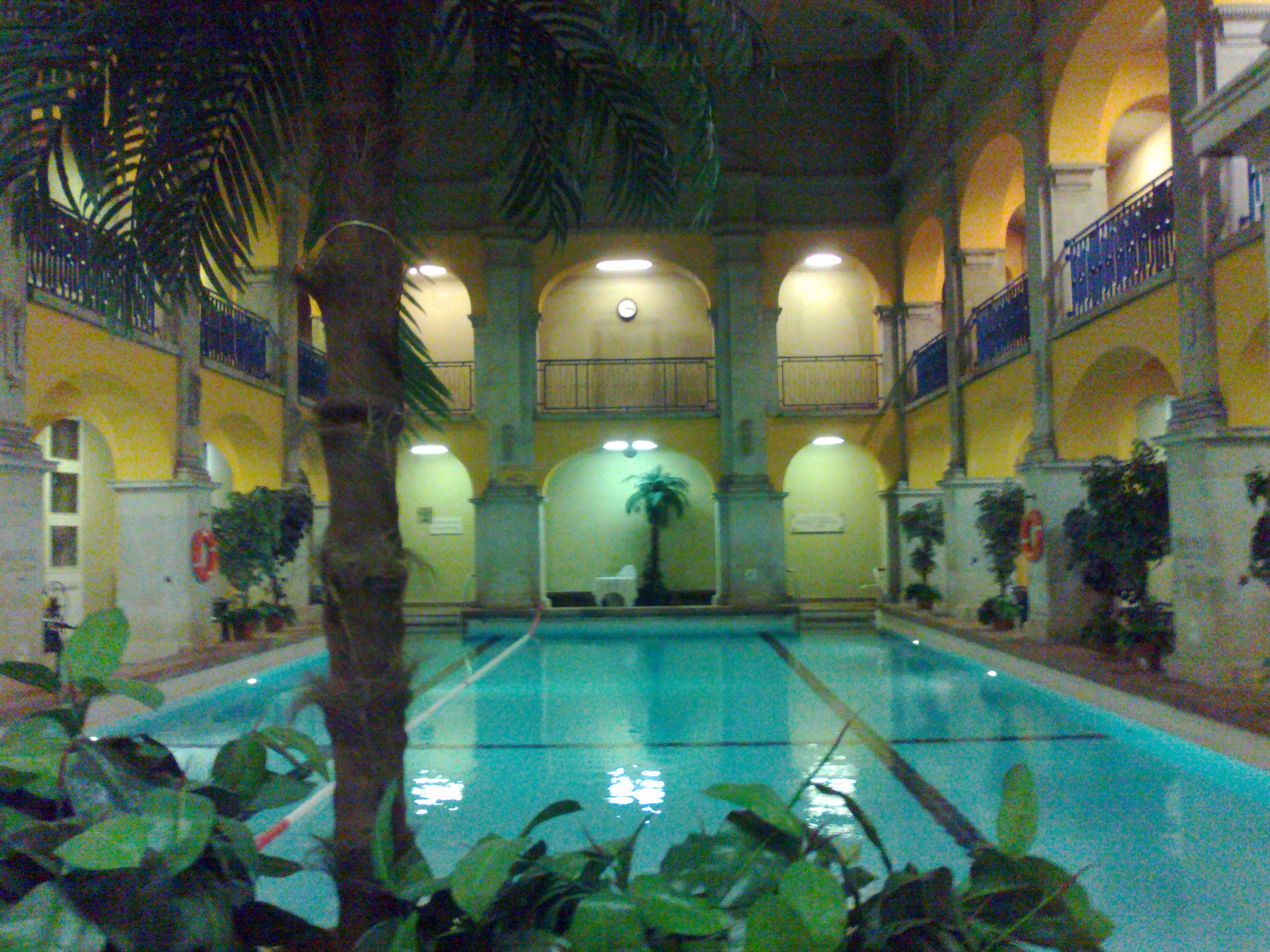
Swimming pool

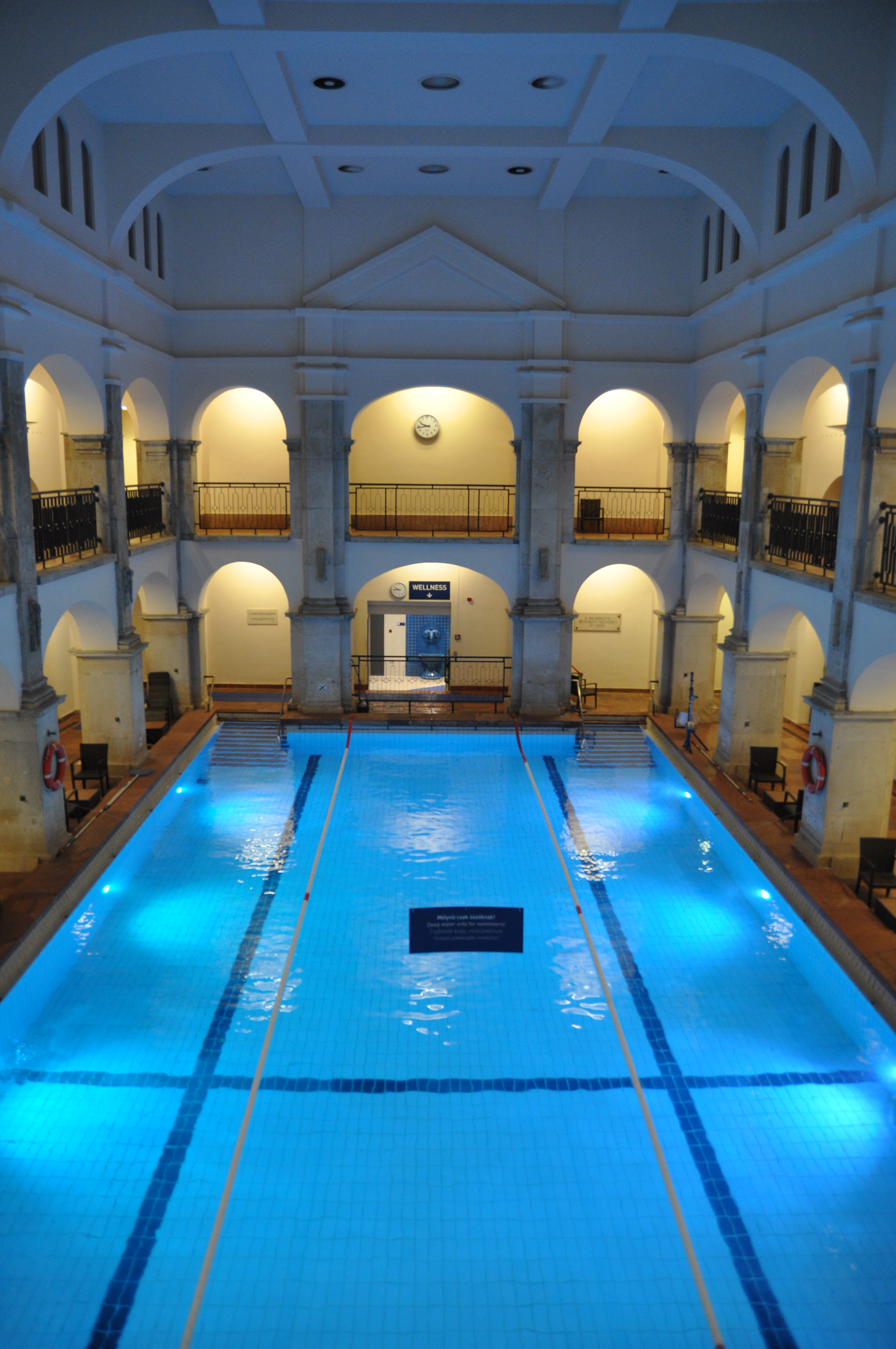
Swimming pool (29 °C)

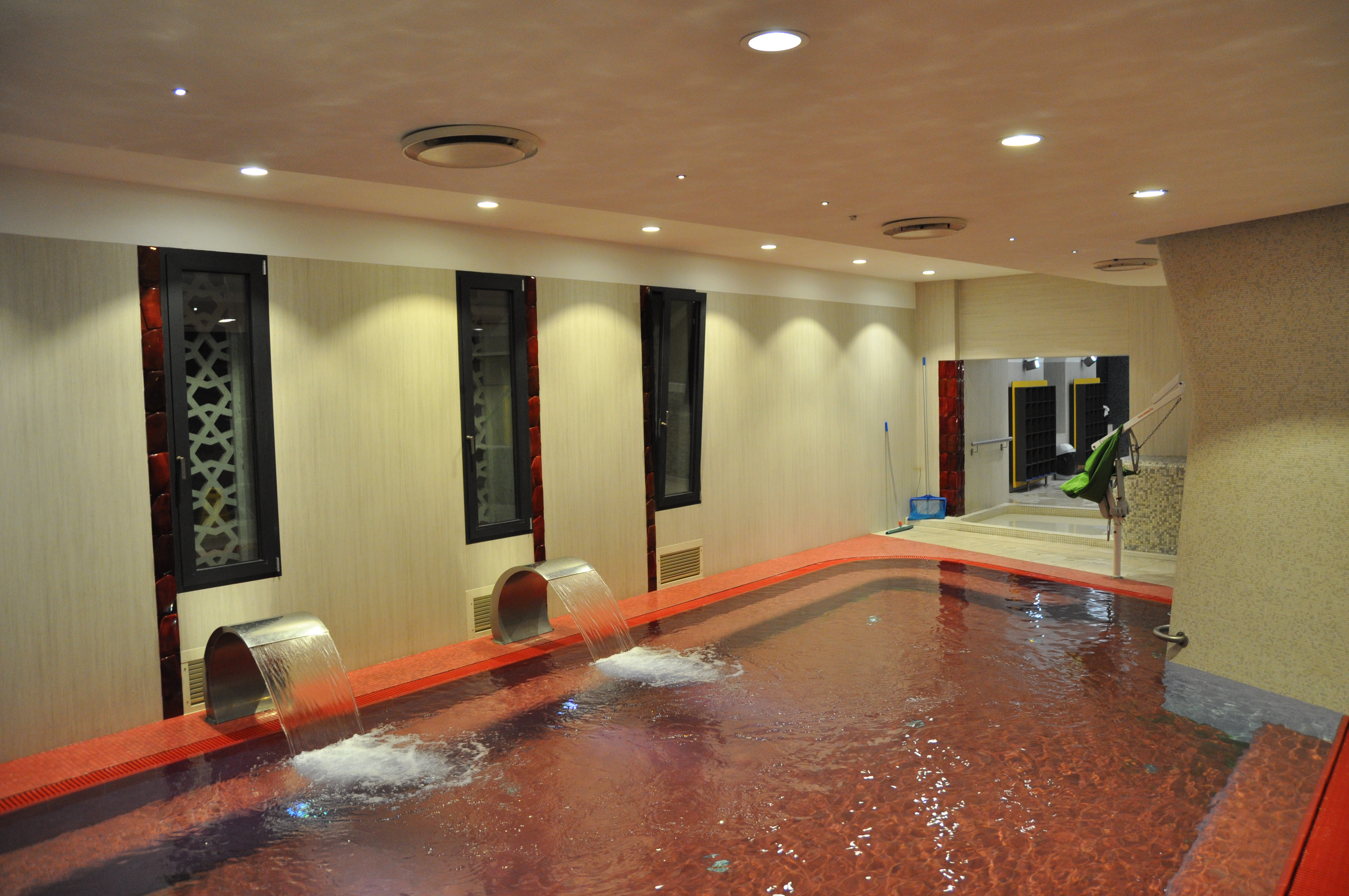
32 °C

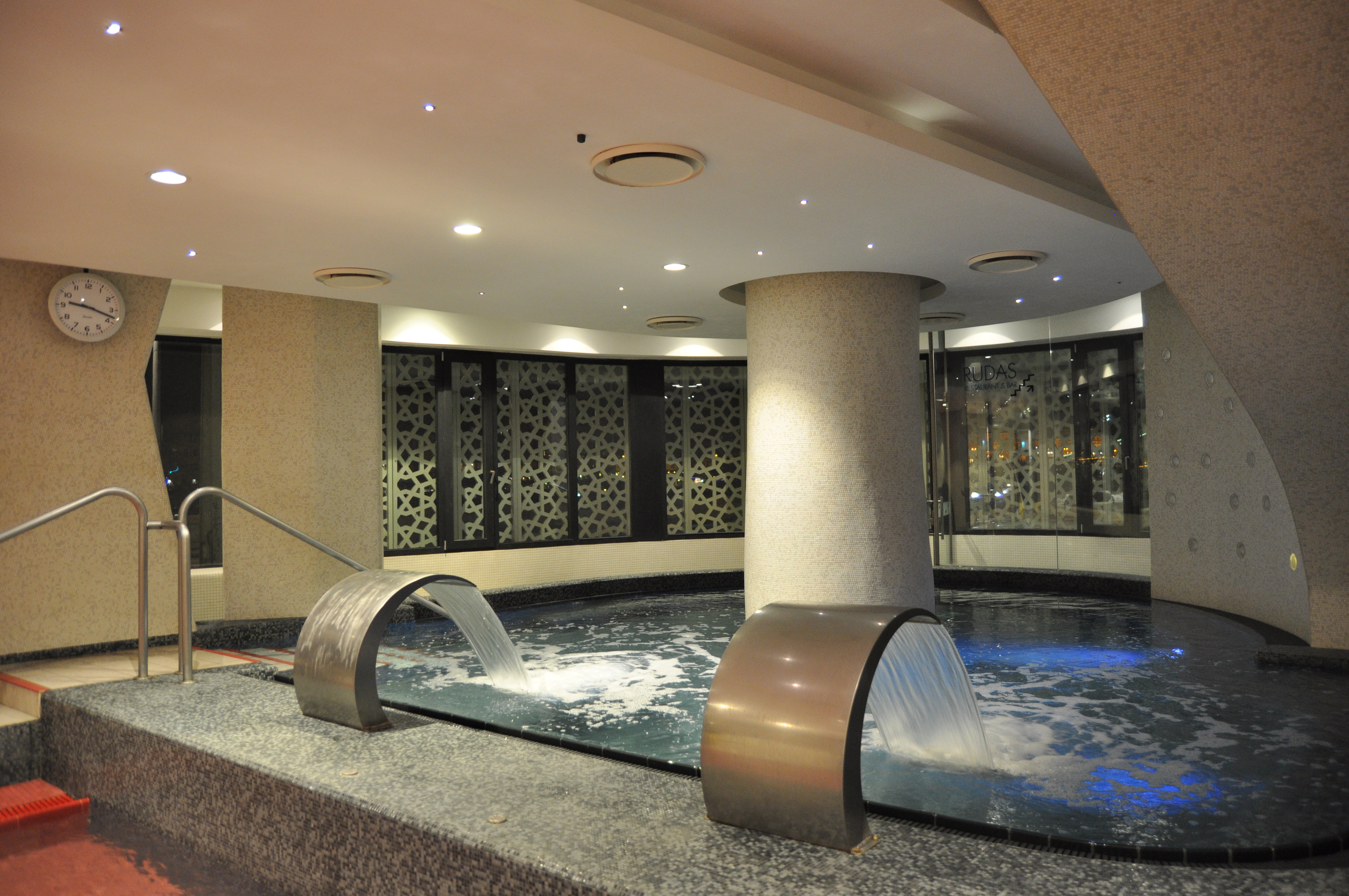
36 °C

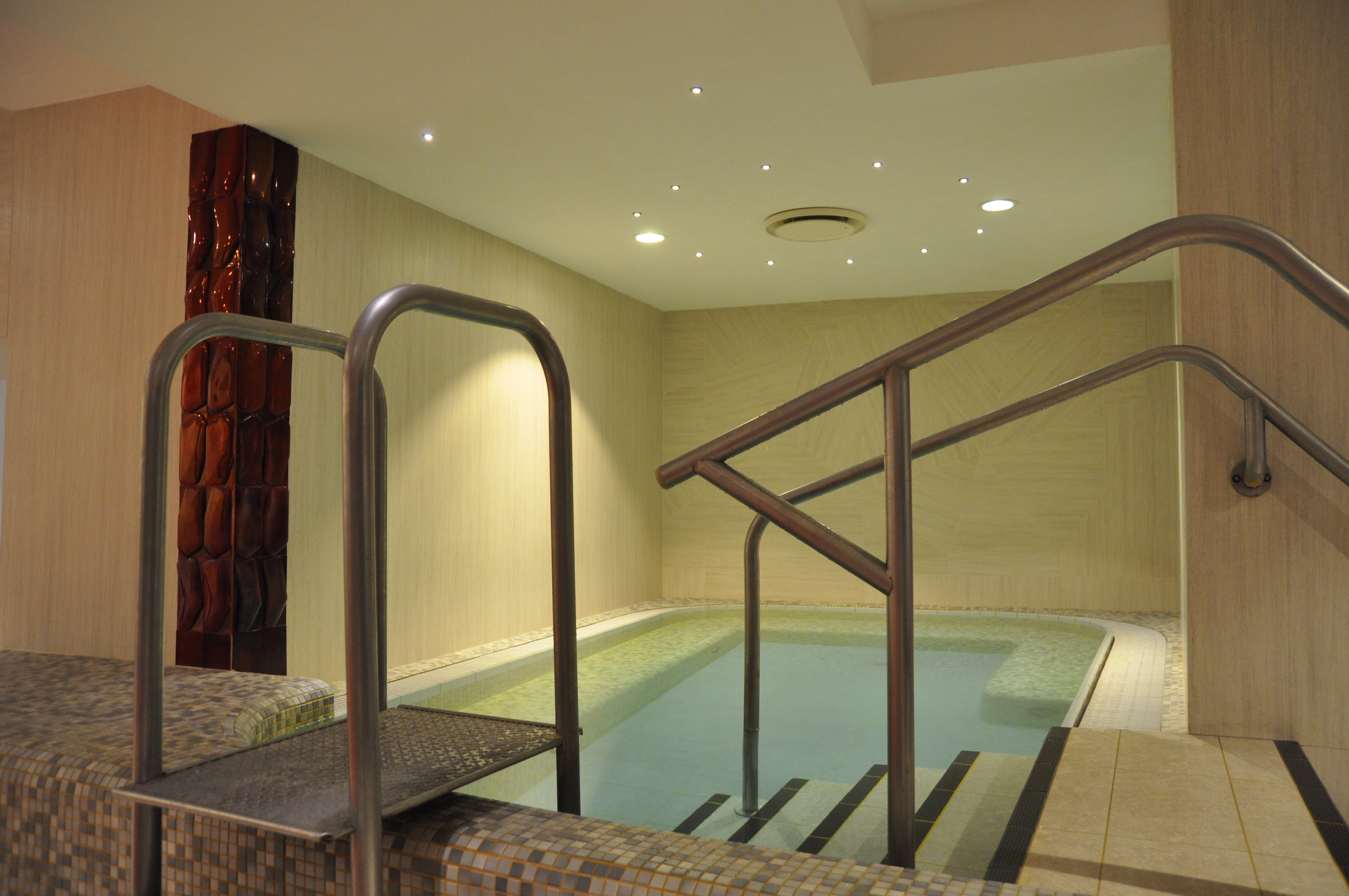
42 °C

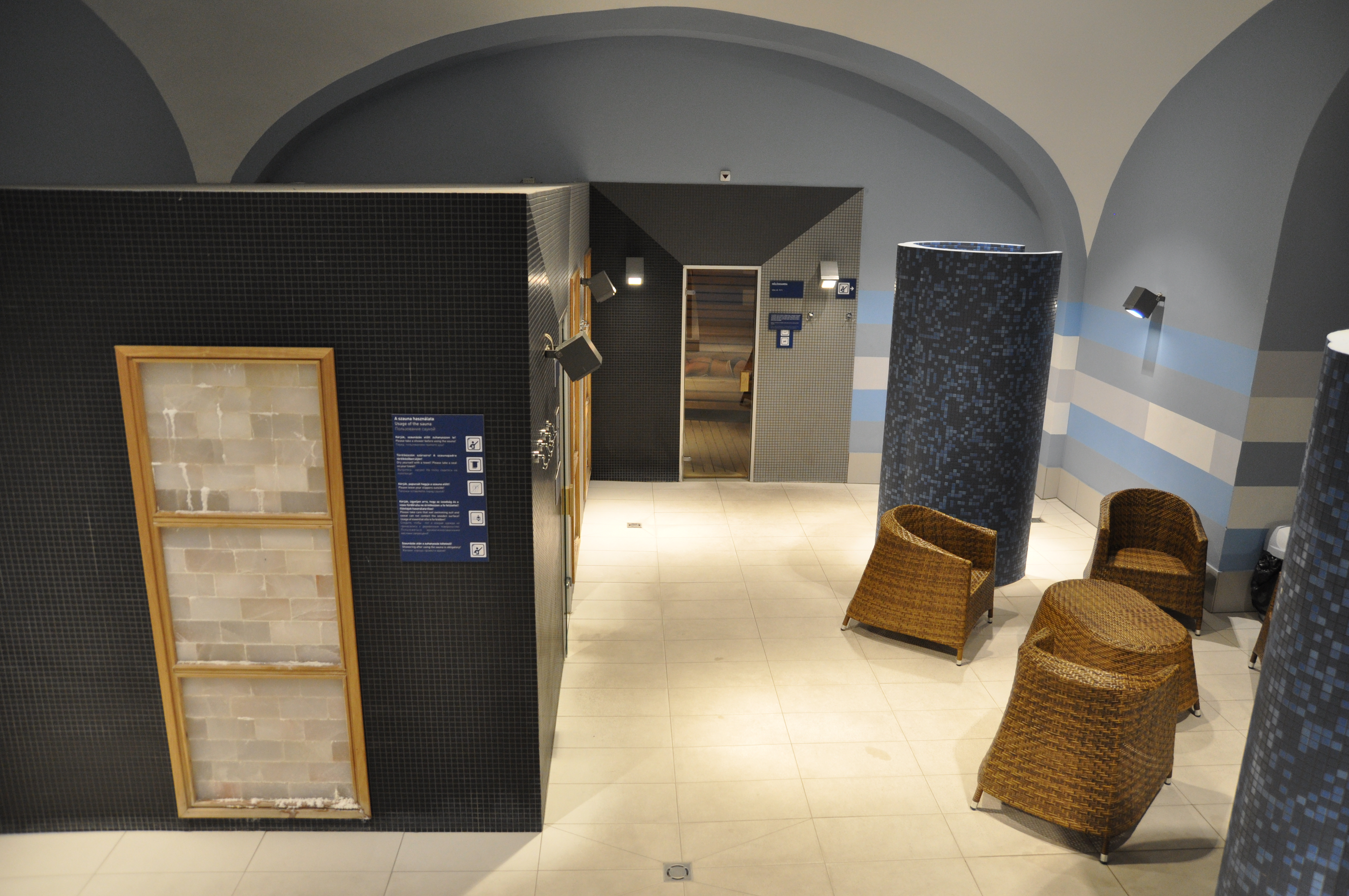
Sauna world

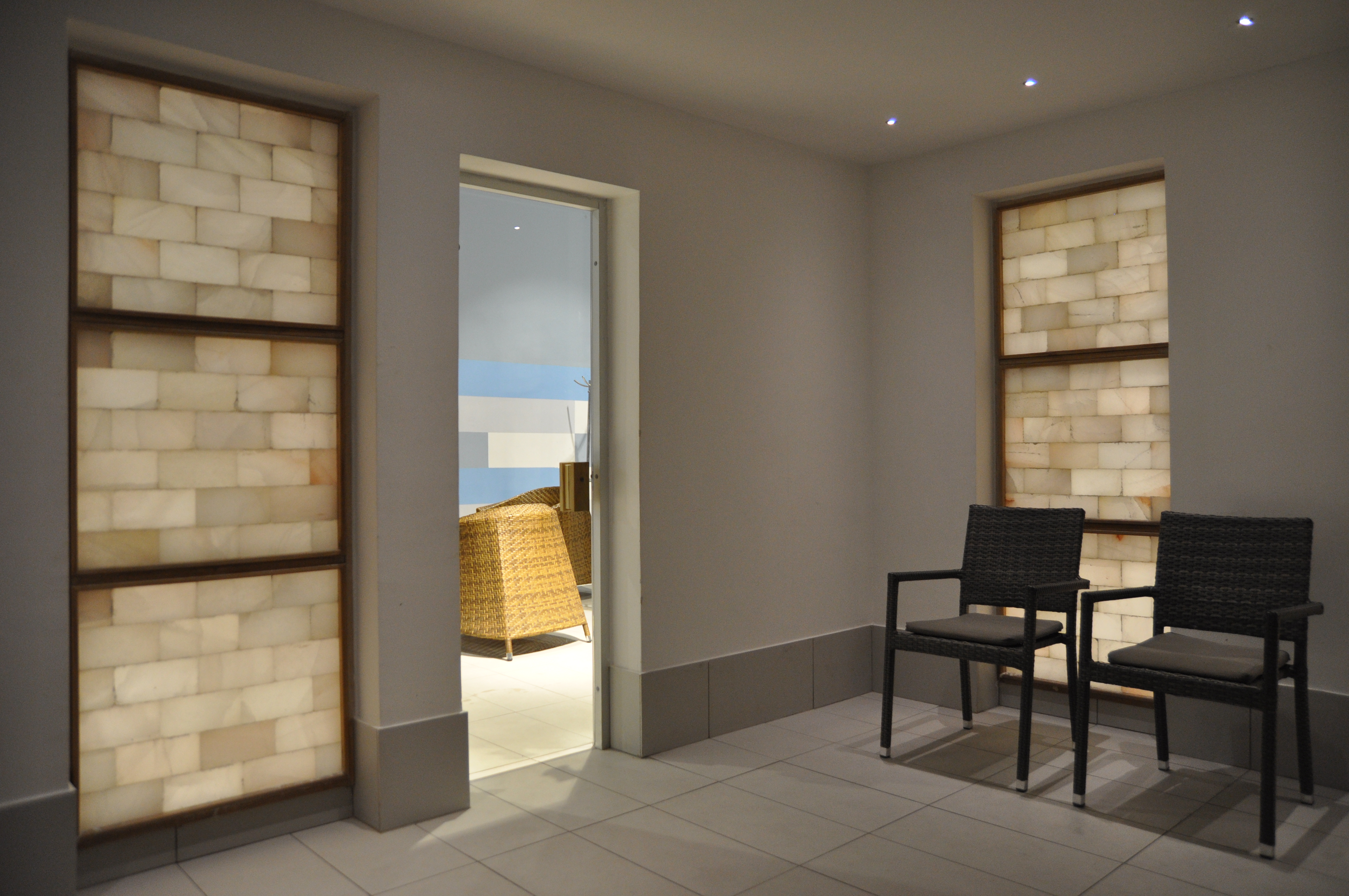
Salt room

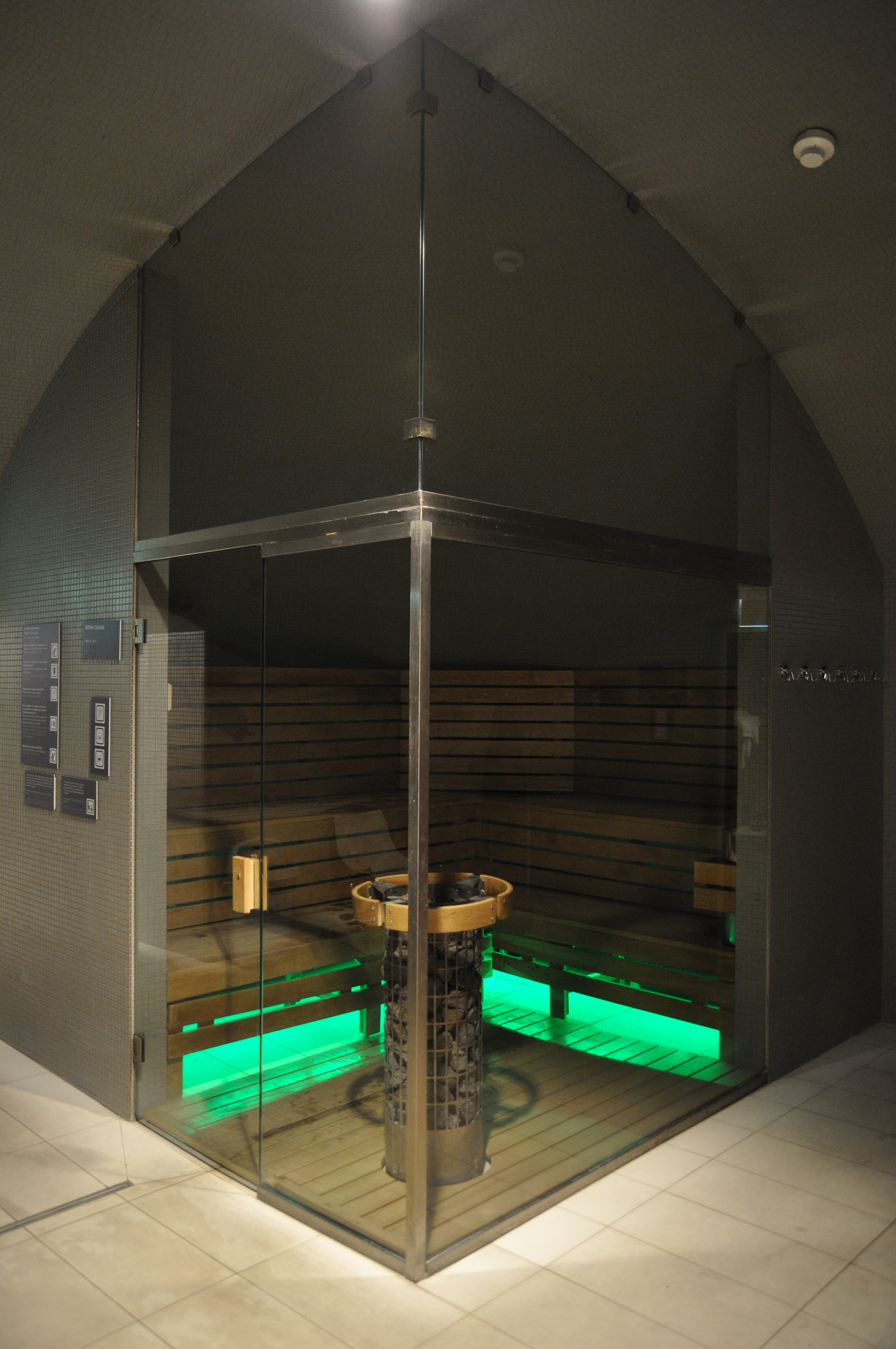
Aroma sauna

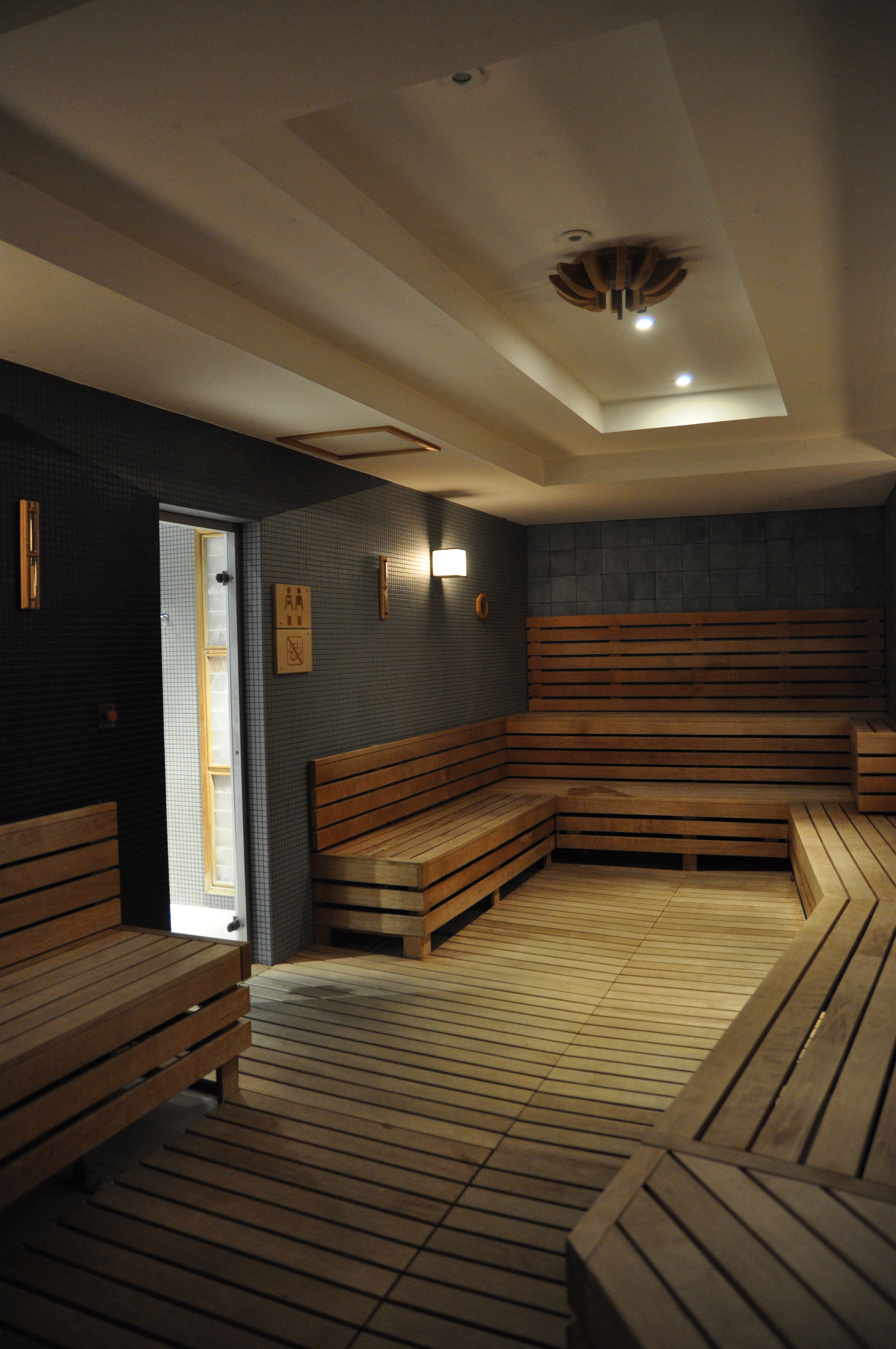
Dry sauna

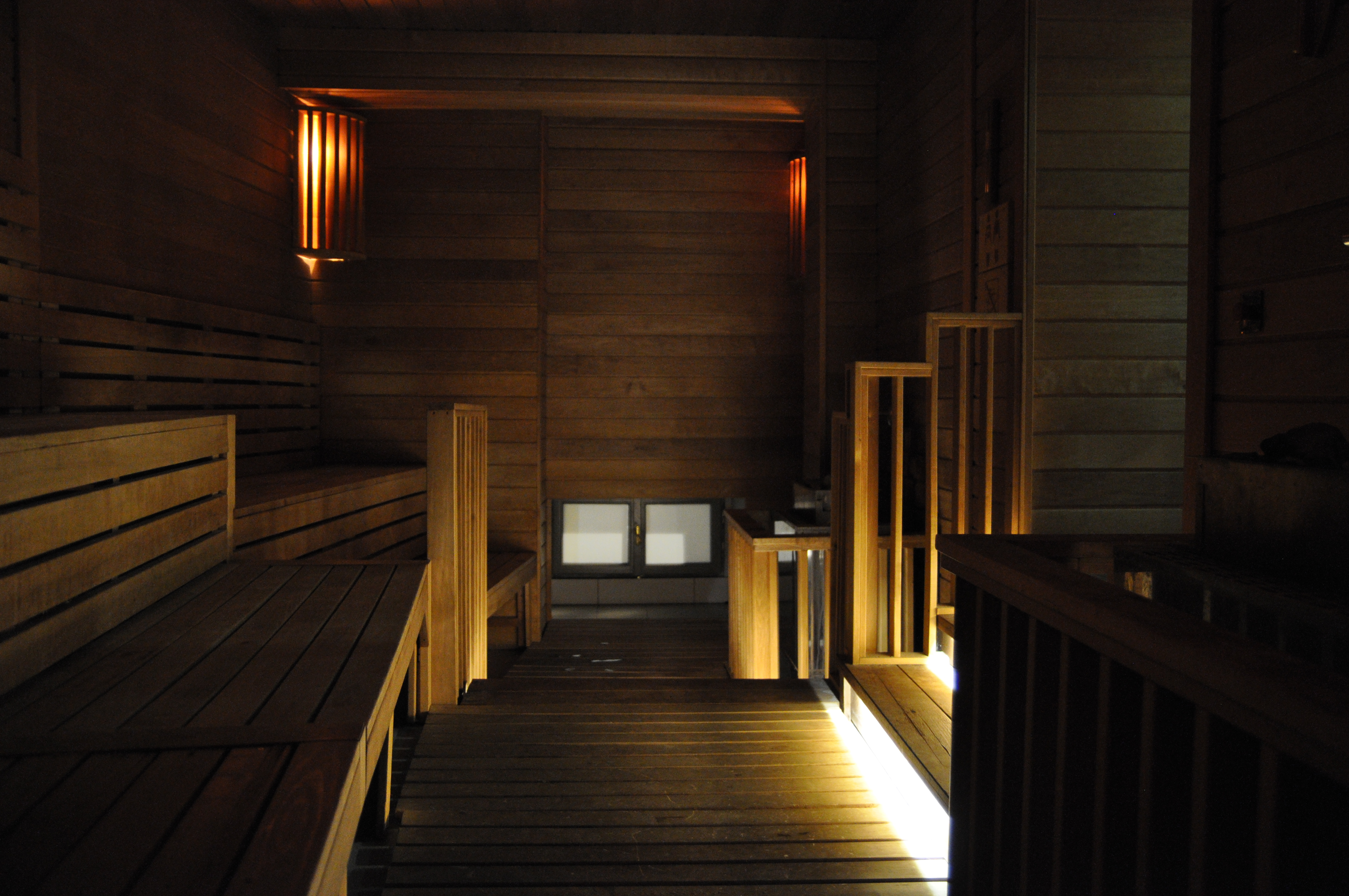
Finnish sauna

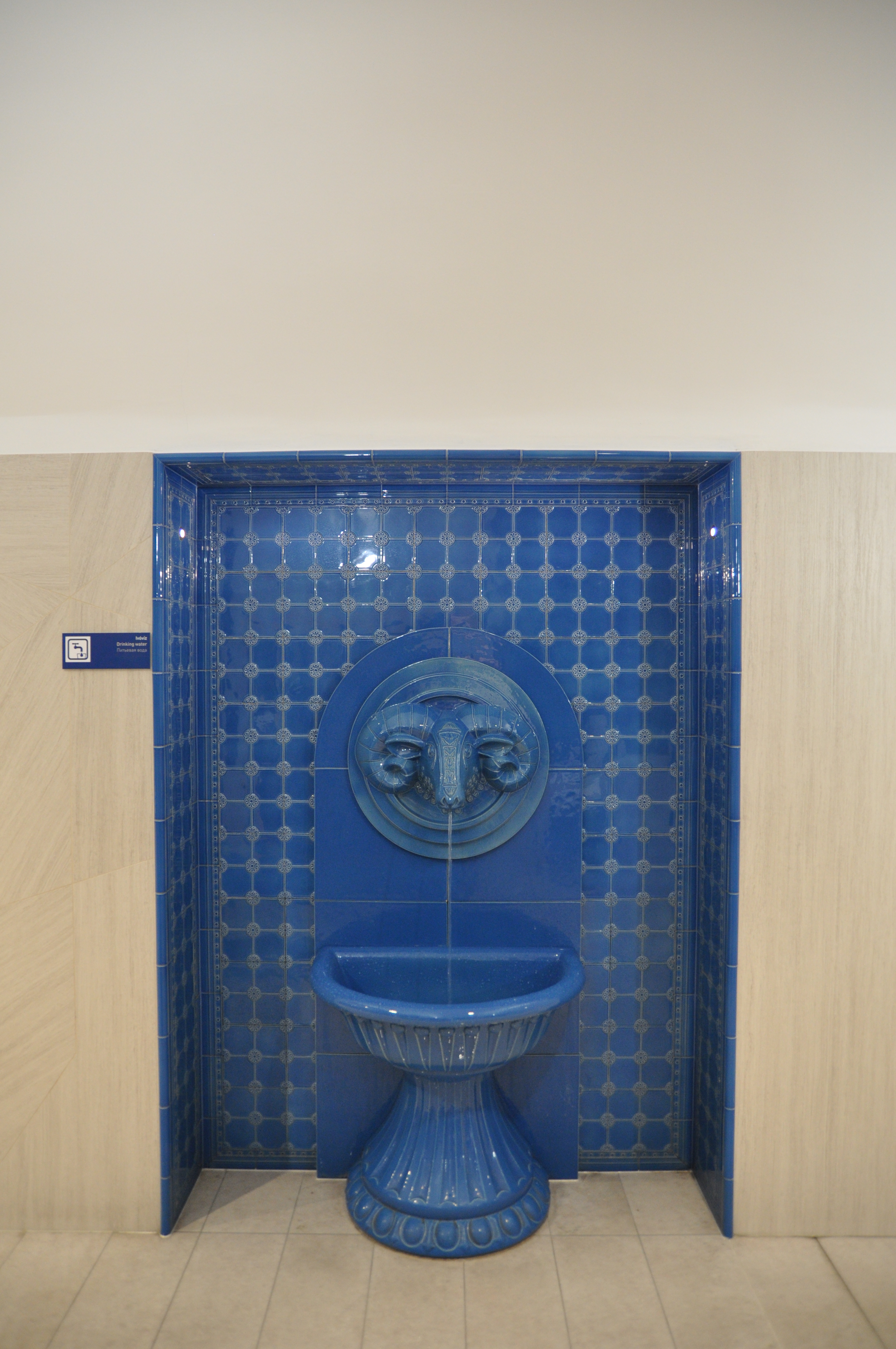
Drinking well
