= Battle of Obreška =

- Part of the Ottoman wars in Europe; Ottoman–Croatian Wars
- Obreška (Croatia)
Date	10 September 1565
Location	Ivanić-Grad, Kingdom of Croatia, Habsburg monarchy
Result	Croatian victory

Belligerents
Ottoman Empire	Habsburg Monarchy: Kingdom of Croatia

Commanders and leaders
Mustafa Pasha Sokolović	Croatian ban Peter Erdődy

Strength
12,000	1,000 cavalry and 3,000 infantry (armed serfs)

Casualties and losses
Heavy	Light

The Battle of Obreška (Croatian: Bitka kod Obreške) was fought on 10 September 1565 between the Ottoman forces of Mustafa Pasha Sokolović, sanjakbey of Bosnia, and the Germanic and Croatian forces led by Croatian ban Petar Erdody. The battle was a part of the Croatian–Ottoman wars and Ottoman–Habsburg wars between the Ottoman Empire and the Habsburg monarchy.

== Prelude ==
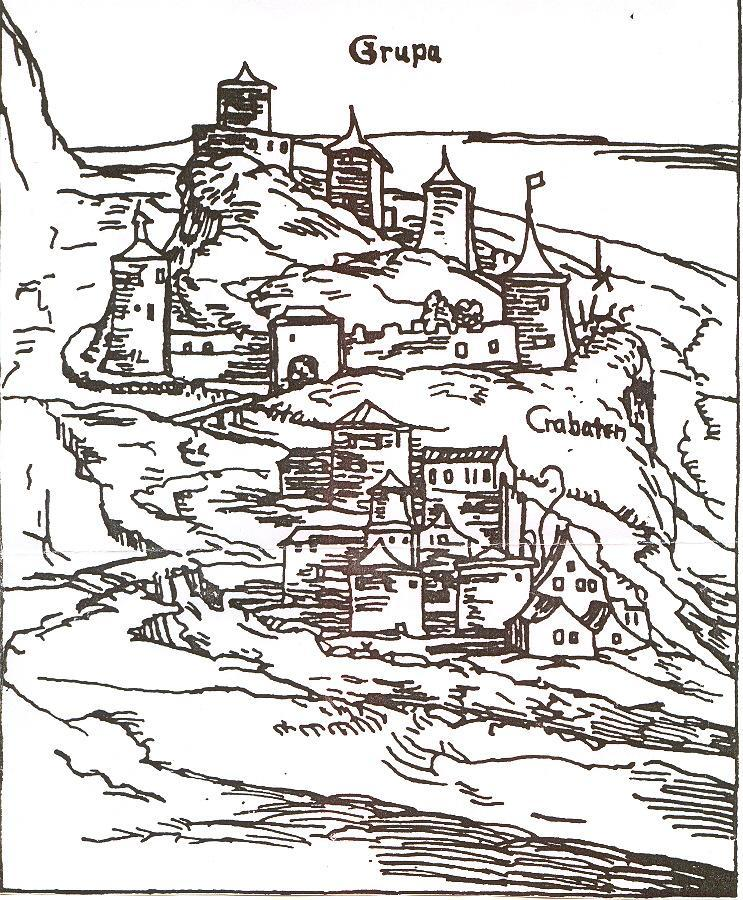
Krupa in 1530

Death of Hungarian and Croatian king Ferdinand I of Habsburg in 1564 annihilated the Habsburg-Ottoman armistice signed in 1562. As a pretext for a new campaign, Sulayman the Magnificent used ongoing civil war in Hungary, between Transylvanian prince Jan Zapolya (pretender for the crown of Hungary and Ottoman vassal) and Ferdinand's son and new king, Maximilian.

In the summer of 1565, as a prelude to a full scale Ottoman-Habsburg war, Mustafa Pasha Sokolović, sanjakbey of Bosnia, attacked the Croatian frontier and besieged the fortress at Krupa. A small garrison (only 28 men), led by Matija Bakić, resisted valiantly for 20 days, but finally succumbed to overwhelming Ottoman forces on 23 June 1565. Further intrusion into Croatia by Sokollu Mustafa was checked by Croatian ban Petar Erdody in the battle of Obreška.

== Battle ==
Obreška is a village near Ivanić-Grad, where on 10 September 1565 an Ottoman raiding party from Bosnia was met by Croatian ban's troops; it was just another Ottoman raid into the Kingdom of Croatia.

After the sack of Krupa, an Ottoman detachment led by Bosnian sanjakbey Mustafa Pasha Sokolović (about 12,000 men) crossed the river Sava and started to plunder along the rivers Lonja and Glogovnica towards Križevci. The Ottomans were caught unaware and after a short engagement scattered near Obreška by the army of Croatian ban Petar Erdody (1557-67)-about 1,000 cavalry and 3,000 infantry conscripts (lat. insurrectio), mostly armed serfs.

== Aftermath ==
For this victory, Petar Erdody was awarded the title of a count by King Maximilian of Hungary and Croatia.

== Bibliography ==
- Vojna enciklopedija (1970–76), 10 volumes, Vojno izdavački zavod Beograd, book 6, p. 226, article Obreška (in Serbo-Croatian)
