= Osman Pasha the Bosnian =

Ottoman statesman

Osman Pasha the Bosnian (Turkish: Boşnak Osman Paşa; died 1 August 1685) or the Herzegovinian (Turkish: Hersekli Osman Paşa), known as Osman Pasha Kazanac, was an Ottoman statesman who served as the governor of the Damascus Eyalet (1676–1678, 1683), of Anatolia Eyalet (1678–1680), of Egypt Eyalet (1680–1683), of Diyarbekir Eyalet (1683), of Bosnia Eyalet (1684), and of Eğri Eyalet (1685). His byname suggests that he hailed from the Sanjak of Bosnia or the Sanjak of Herzegovina.

While governor of the Eğri Eyalet (English: Eger) during the Great Turkish War, he was caught outside of the walls of the Castle of Eger when the Austrians began their siege, dying on August 1, 1685.

Osman-paša Kazanac (Osman-paša Hercegovac), as he was also known, married a daughter of Kara Mustafa Pasha, with whom he had a number of sons.

== See also ==
- List of Ottoman governors of Egypt
- List of Ottoman governors of Bosnia
- List of rulers of Damascus

Political offices
| Preceded by Abdurrahman Abdi Pasha the Albanian | Ottoman Governor of Egypt; 1680–1683 | Succeeded by Hamza Pasha |
