= Ali Ibrahim Pasha =

Egyptian politician

Ali Ibrahim Pasha was the minister of education of Egypt from 18 August 1879 to 9 September 1881 during the Khedivate of Egypt.
