= Sokollu Mustafa Pasha =

Ottoman governor of Budin from 1566 to 1578

Sokollu Mustafa Pasha (Turkish: Sokollu Mustafa Paşa, Hungarian: Szokoli Musztafa Pasa, Serbo-Croatian: Mustafa-paša Sokolović) was a 16th-century Ottoman statesman and member of the influential Sokolović family. His uncle (or cousin depending on the sources) was the Grand Vizier Sokollu Mehmed Pasha.

Sokollu Mustafa Pasha is most notable for being the twelfth beylerbey of Budin eyalet, the core province of Ottoman-era Hungary which stretched from Semendire to Esztergom with its capital at Budin (modern day Budapest). His tenure of twelve years (1566–1578) saw many construction works, many of which still stand today in Budapest.

== Early life and education ==
Sokollu Mustafa was born in Bosnia between 1529 and 1536. At age 5, he was brought to Constantinople to study at the enderûn school at Galata Sarayı. Sokollu Mustafa was the first of many family members who were raised up through the Ottoman administration by their senior relative and patron Sokollu Mehmed, which included Deli Hüsrev Pasha, Lala Mustafa Pasha, Tiyraki Hasan Pasha and Ferhat Pasha.

Spending between four and eleven years at the enderûn school, Sokollu Mustafa served as falconer (çakırcıbaşı) in 1546. He participated in Suleiman the Magnificent's campaign in Iraq in 1548–1549.

== Early career ==
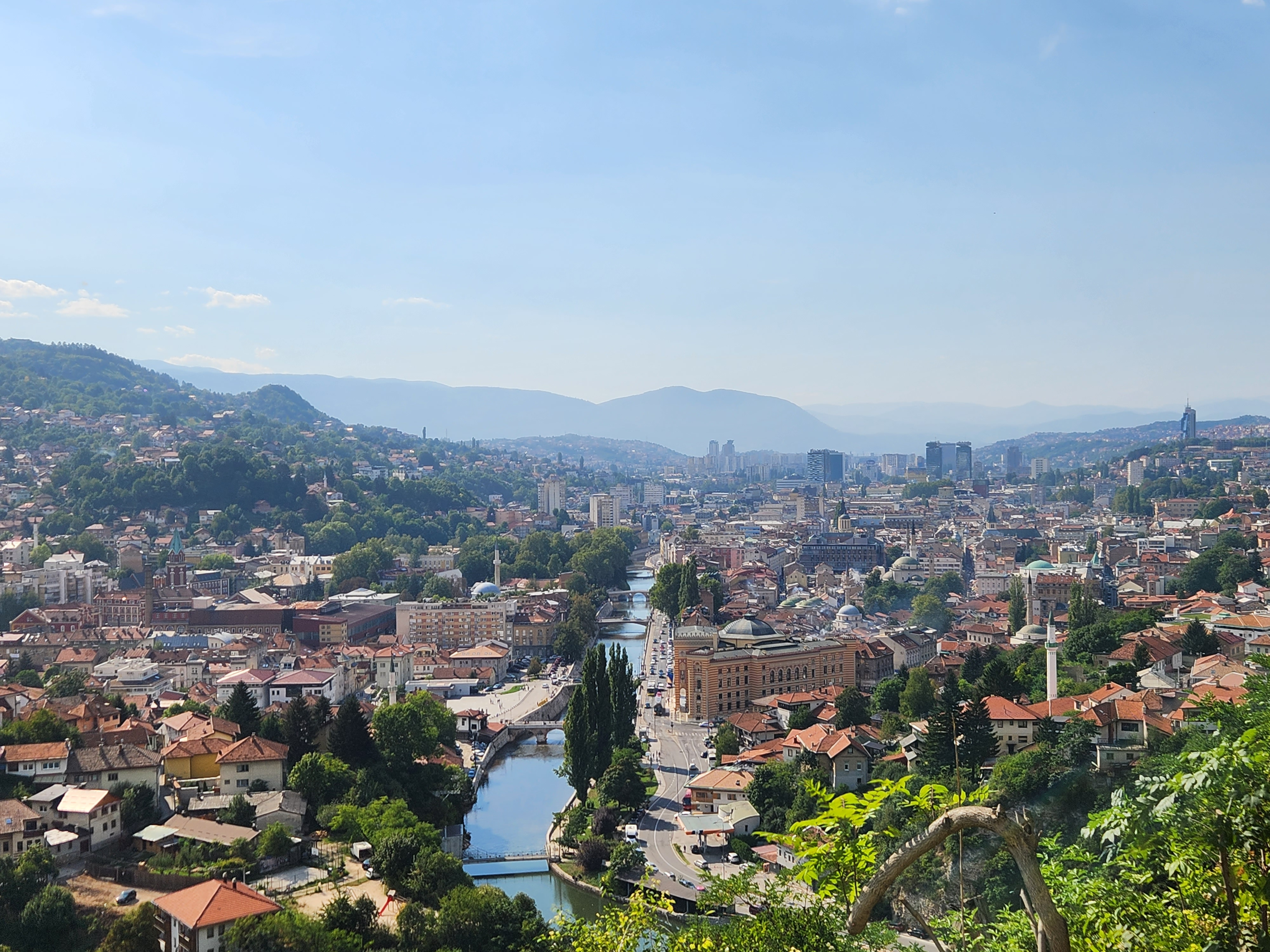
Sarajevo

Sokollu Mustafa was appointed financial controller (defter kethüdası) of Temeşvar on April 23, 1553. His annual income was 60,000 akçes. He later served as district governor of Fülek, Klis and Szeged sanjaks.

After serving as sanjakbey of Hersek for less than a year, he was appointed sanjakbey of Bosnia on September 26, 1563, by Sultan Suleiman. His return to his birthplace of Bosnia was celebrated by the local populace. It is said that Sokollu Mustafa had a special love for Bosnasaray:

A unique town bisected by a river whose banks were lined with willow trees. It was a green and airy place, full of pools and groves. The fruit-filled trees of the juicy and sweet apple, quince and pear grow in all seasons and whose branches could not bear the weight and touched the ground. It was surrounded by high mountains. These mountains had dense forests and their peaks were covered with snow. Thanks to the beautiful air and water of this heavenly city, its people were good-natured, chaste, intelligent, and its young people were tall and healthy.

According to a story, on one particular night Sokollu Mustafa meditated from sunset to dawn and came to the determination to establish charitable works in gratitude for his successful career. Following the footsteps of Gazi Hüsrev Bey whose prominent waqf endowment works are extensive throughout Bosnia, Sokollu Mustafa built many caravanserai, mosques, schools, bridges and water fountains in Sarajevo, Banja Luka, Gorajede, Mokra, Trn, Maglaj, Kostajnica and Sokol.

Sokollu Mustafa served as the commander of the Ottoman forces at the siege of Krupa castle between June 3–23, 1565 which led to an Ottoman victory against the Croatian forces led by Zrínyi Miklós. His forces were later defeated at the Battle of Obreška on September 10, 1565. These two military engagements were precursors to the Suleiman the Magnificent's final campaign at the siege of Szigetvar from August 6 to September 8, 1566.

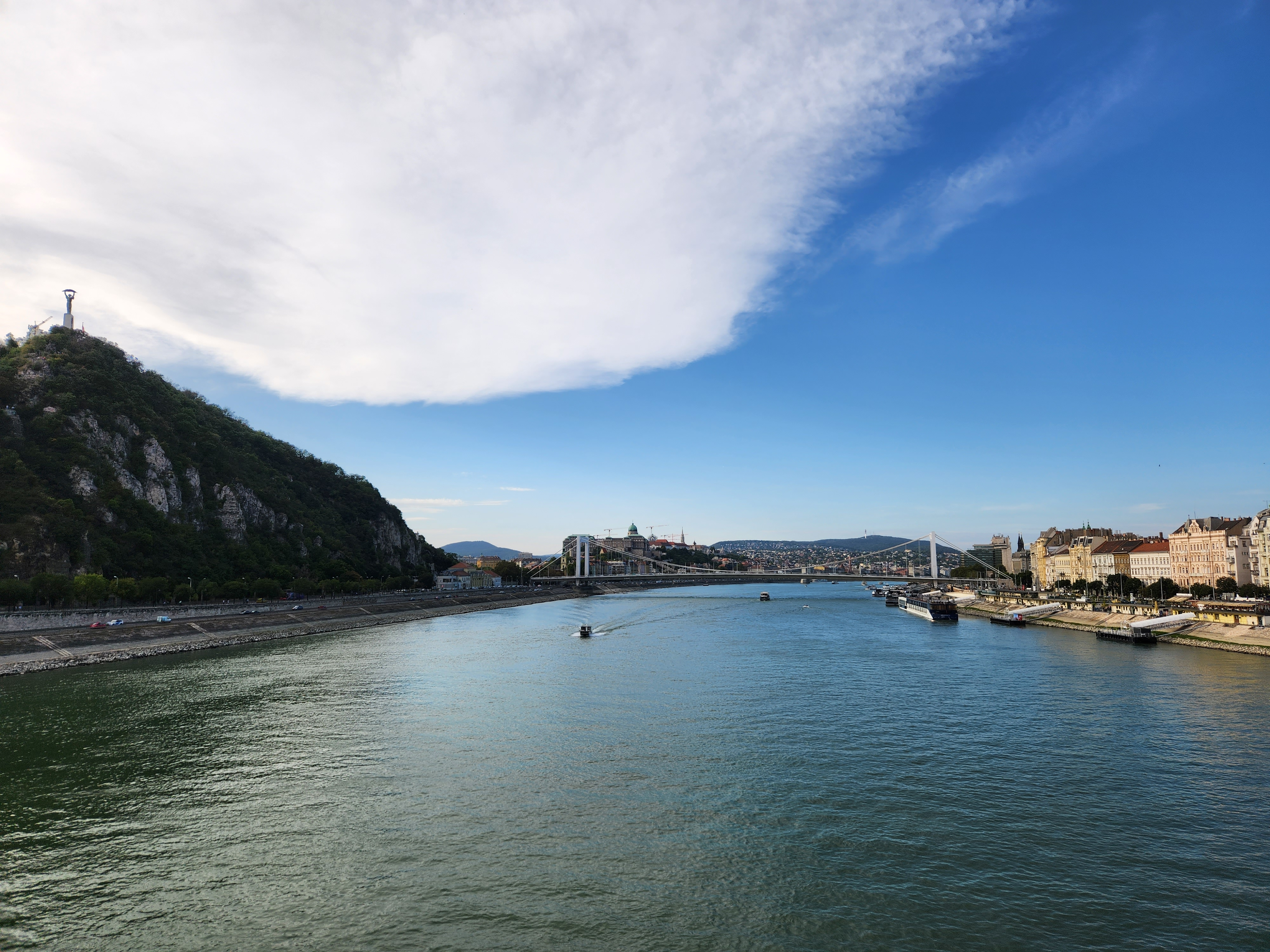
Budapest

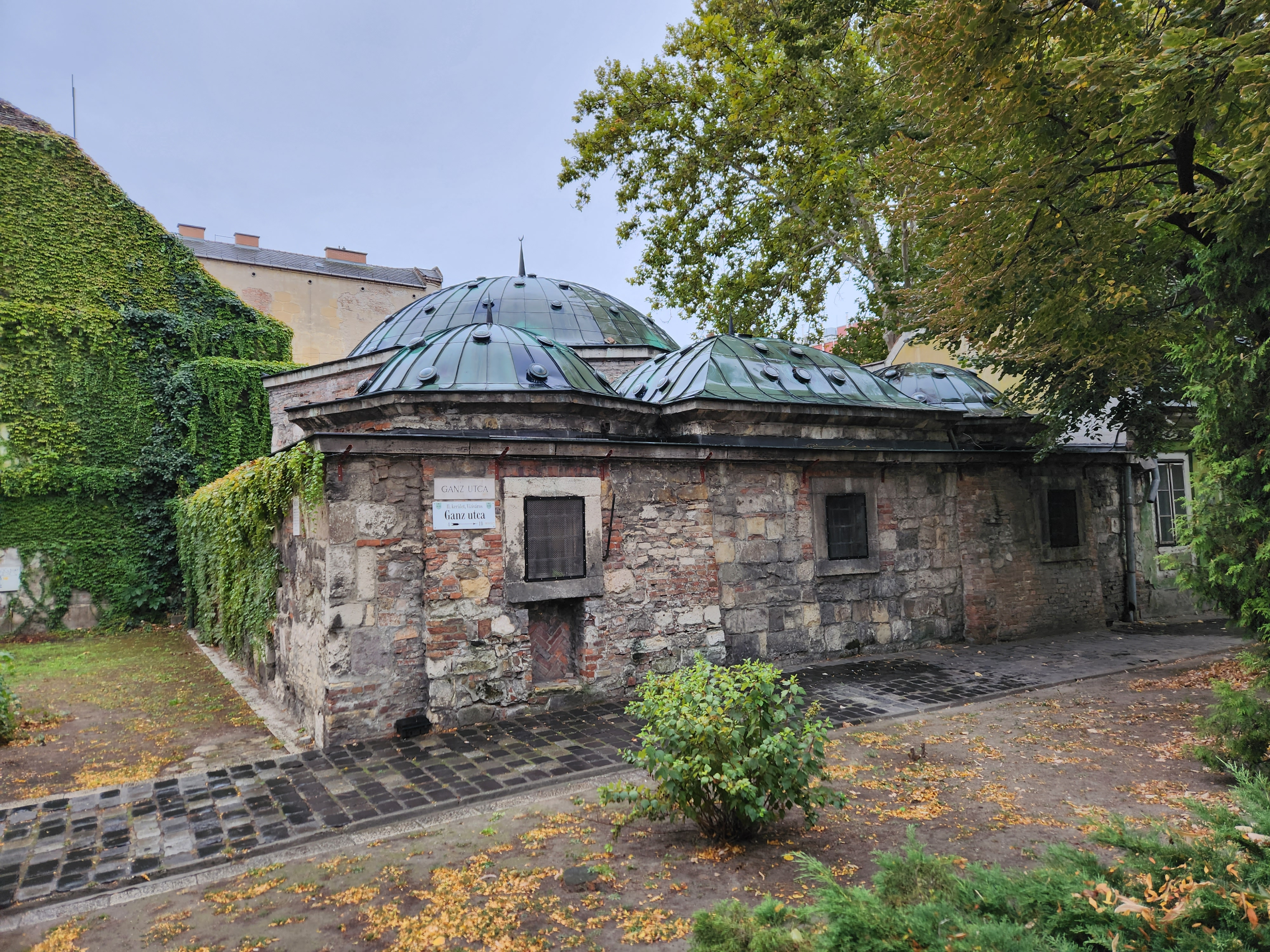
Kiraly baths

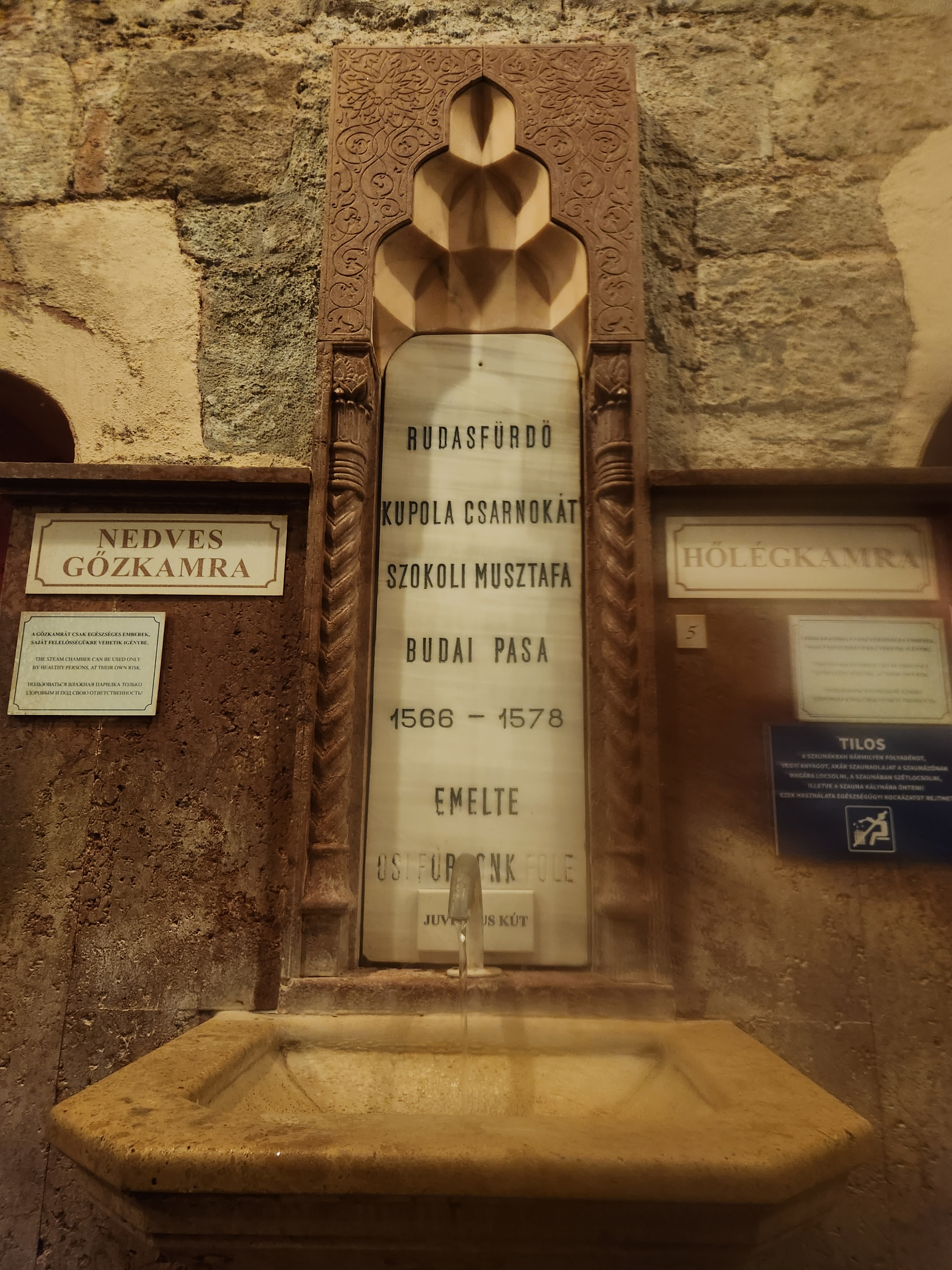
Inscription at Rudas baths

== Governorship of Budin ==
Prior to the Szigetvar campaign the beylerbey of Budin, Aslan Pasha (1565–66), was executed for an unsanctioned and aborted siege of Palota fortress, which had led to the loss of Ottoman soldiers and abandoned artillery. Sokollu Mustafa was appointed as the beylerbey of Budin on July 31, 1566.

He served as governor general at this distinguished posting for an unprecedented twelve years which covered parts of the reigns of Suleiman I, Selim II and Murad III. The beylerbey exercised a degree of local autonomy at the often turbulent but highly critical Ottoman-Habsburg frontier. Sokollu Mustafa Pasha was known as a just and effective Ottoman administrator by his subjects and was even regarded positively by the Habsburg monarch Maximilian II due to his endeavours in maintaining peaceful relations.

According to over 120 letters written in Hungarian and sent from Budin, Sokollu Mustafa Pasha corresponded regularly between the Ottoman capital at Constantinople and the Habsburg court at Vienna. As an administrator, soldier and diplomat, many of the directives included: maintaining the fragile peace between the two empires, securing regular Habsburg tribute to the Ottoman court, securing the safety of merchants and tradesmen, securing the release of captives, requesting building materials, and punishing criminals and brigands.

Ottoman-era Hungary saw the transformation of the former kingdom of Hungary into a multiethnic Balkan society as many Bosnians, Serbs and Croats settled into the eyalet of Budin. Three centuries after its establishment in 1241 by King Béla IV of Hungary, the city of Buda was once again serving primarily as a strategic stronghold on the frontiers of civilizations, with a large presence of Ottoman military and civil servants and few skilled tradesmen or artisans.

Up to 12,500 salaried garrison troops, including 1000 janissaries, and approximately 3000 timiariots were stationed in the frontier eyalet at a significant annual cost of 23 million akçes. Sokollu Mustafa's administration saw improvements in the economic situation of the eyalet as annual revenues increased from 9 million akçes in the early 1560s to a peak of 21.5 million akçes in 1572.

In 1574, Sokollu Mustafa Pasha was appointed as one of seven viziers of the imperial council in Constantinople. He was permitted to hold this position while serving predominantly at the Ottoman-Hapsburg frontier. At the apex of his career, his annual income was 1.2 million akçes. He spent considerable sums on civic building works which were concentrated in Budin.

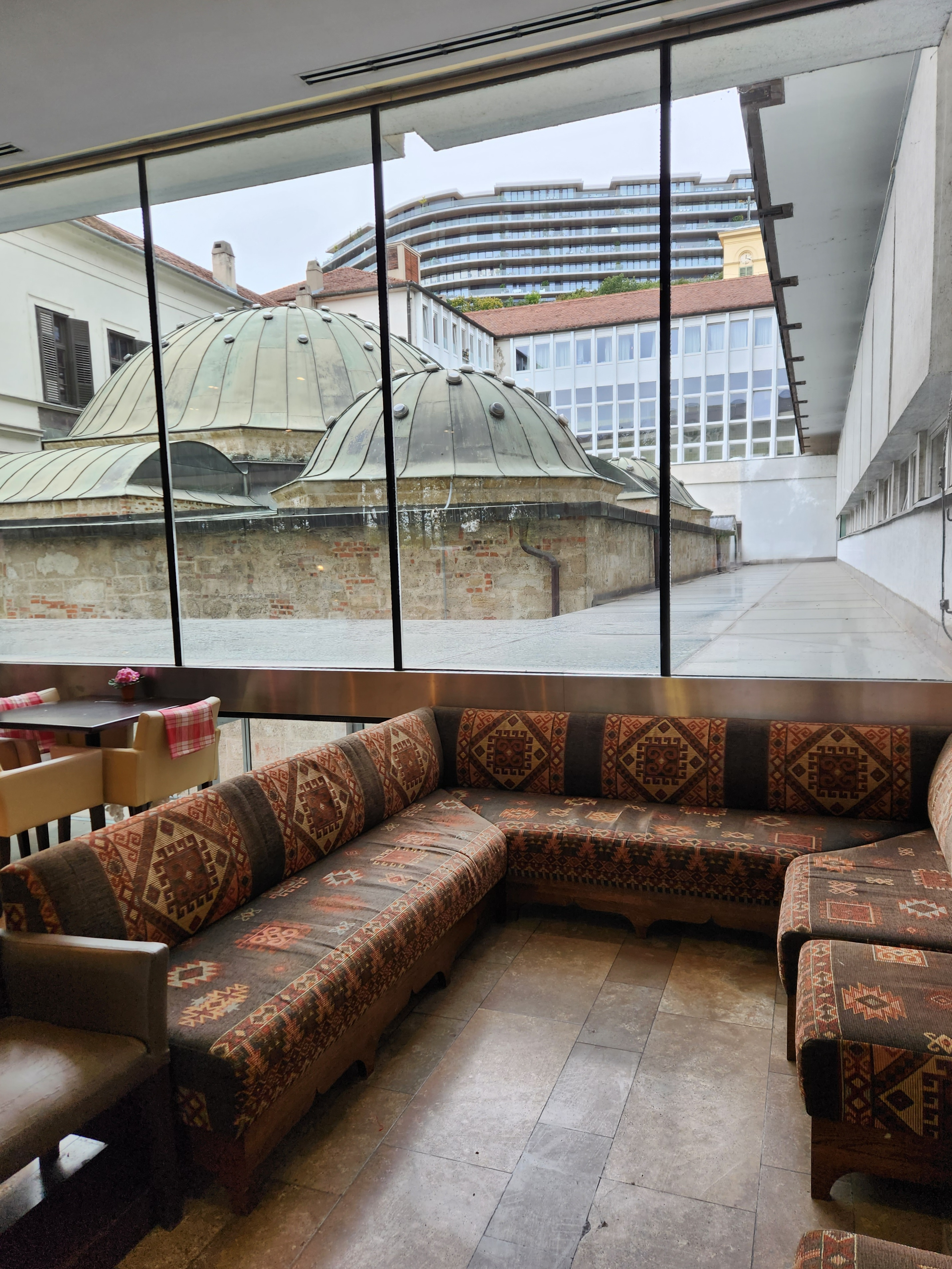
Veli bej baths

== Death ==
In 1578, lightning struck a gunpowder storage (baruthane) at the royal castle at Buda. The resulting explosion destroyed a part of the city and caused significant loss of life, livestock and artillery. The disaster was blamed on Sokollu Mustafa Pasha who was sentenced to be executed by the Sublime Porte. This decision was influenced by court intrigue as rivals of the Grand Vizier sought to discredit and eliminate the influential Sokollu family following the death of Selim II who was their ultimate benefactor. An alternative account, also emphasizing the role of court intrigue, provides that Sokollu Mustafa fell out of favour and was ultimately executed following his refusal to marry a sister of Murad III.

On September 30, 1578, a corps of 23 soldiers arrived at Gellért Hill and proceeded to the governor's palace on the Danube River. Sokollu Mustafa Pasha was apprehended and executed with a silk cord.

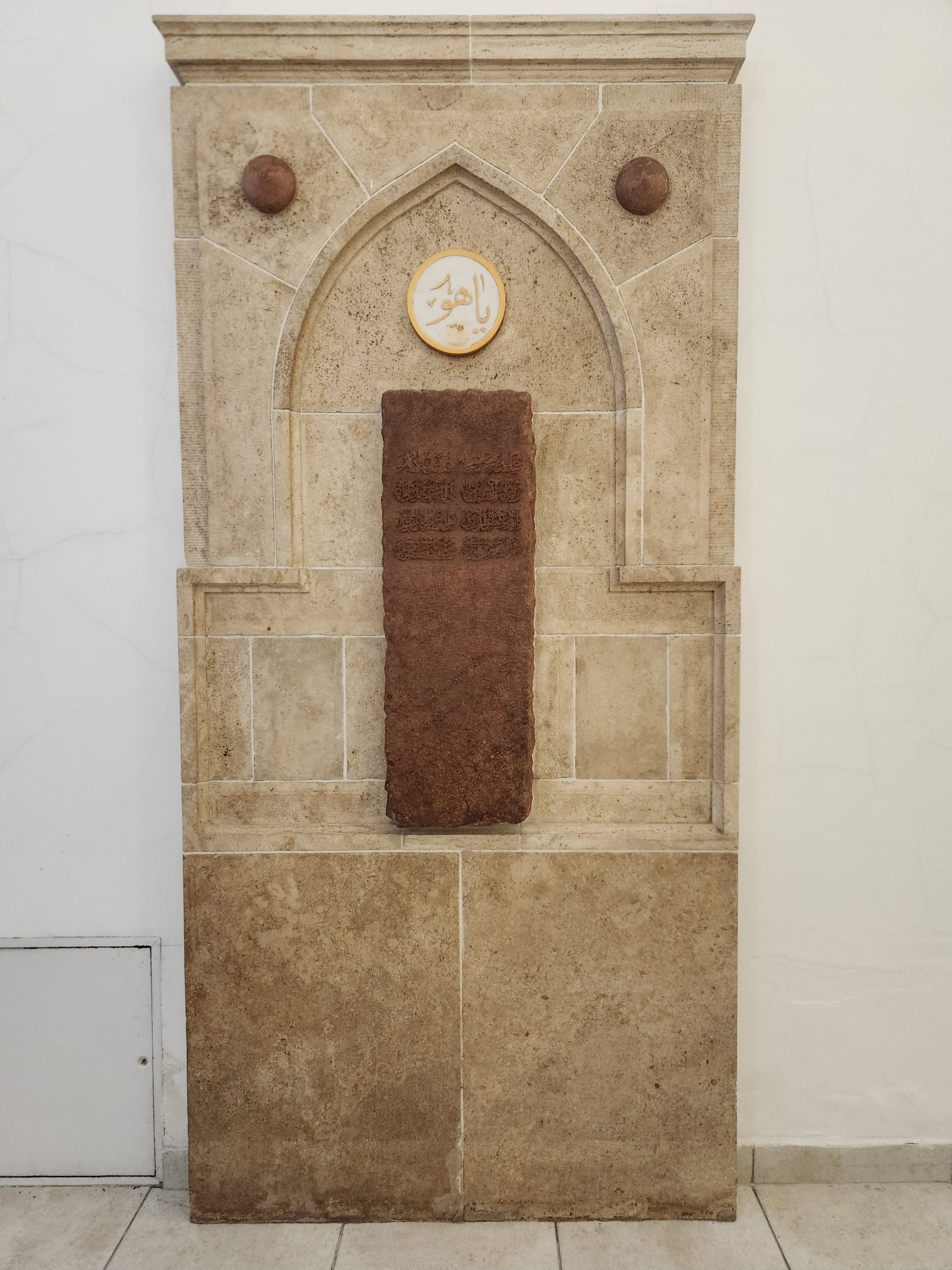
Inscription at Veli bej baths

== Legacy ==
Sokollu Mustafa Pasha's legacy is best known and preserved through the establishment of his waqf endowment. Many of the works still stand, in various forms, in modern-day Budapest:

- Rudas baths (Yeşil direkli ilica)
- Kiraly baths (Horoz ilica)
- Rác baths (Küçük ilica)
- Veli bej baths
- Camii at Tabán (rebuilt as the St. Catherine of Alexandria Church)
- Camii at Viziváros built by Ottoman chief architect Mimar Sinan (rebuilt as the Church of Stigmatisation of Saint Francis)
- Sokollu Mustafa Pasha türbesi also built by Mimar Sinan (believed to be located at Batthyány Square)
