= Ibrahim Dervish Pasha =

Ottoman statesman

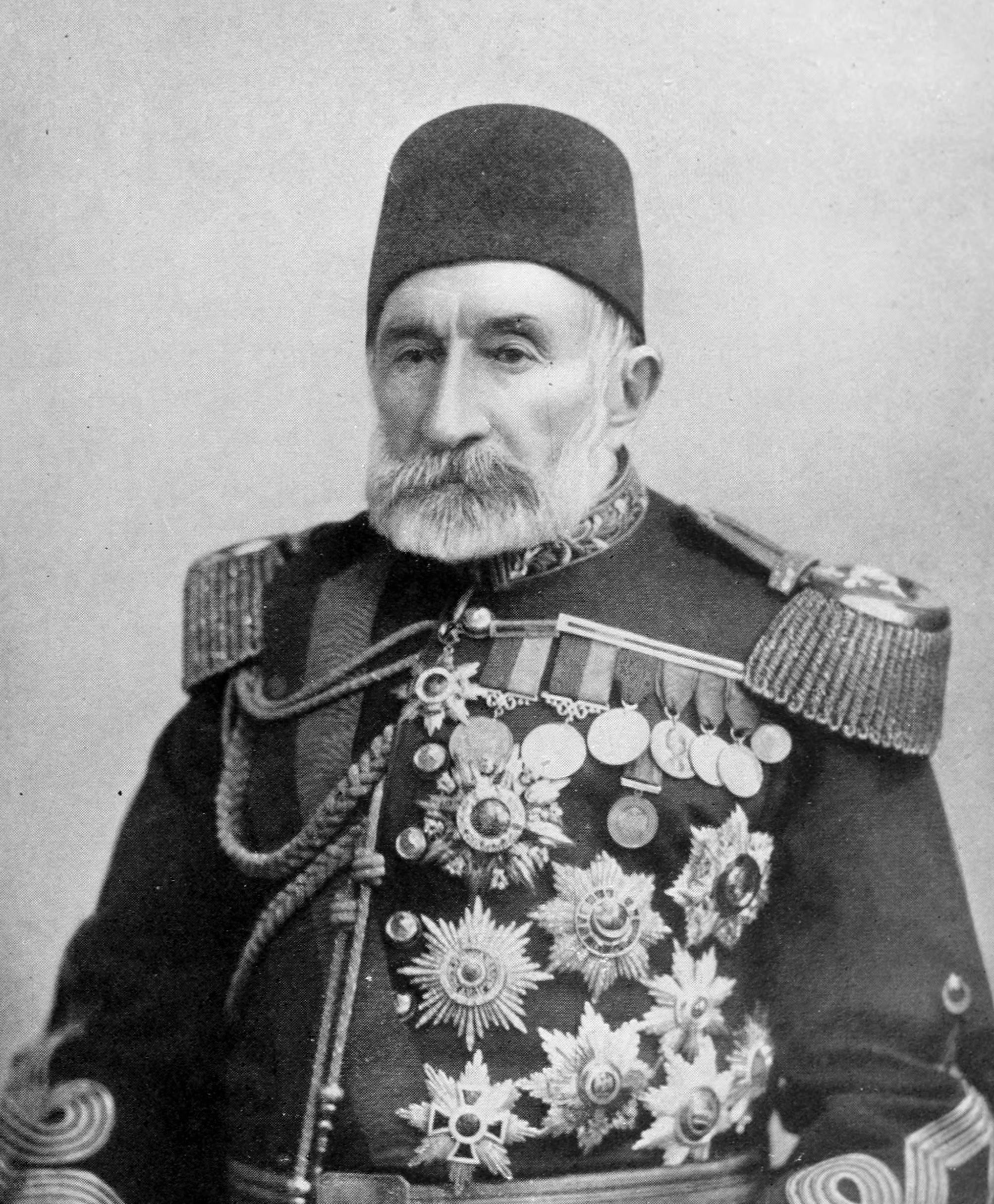
Ibrahim Dervish Pasha

Ibrahim Dervish Pasha (Turkish: İbrahim Derviş Paşa; 1817–1896) was a prominent Ottoman Turkish military figure and statesman during the 19th century who served as the governor of Bosnia.
