= List of bridges in Turkey =

== Historical and architectural interest bridges ==
	Name	Turkish	Distinction	Length	Type	Carries Crosses	Opened	Location	Region	Ref.
1	Taşköprü (Silifke)	Taşköprü	Span : 17.4 m (57 ft)	120 m (390 ft)	Masonry; 7 arches	Road bridge İlhan Akgün Cd; Göksu	78	Silifke; 36°22′45.3″N 33°55′30.8″E	Mediterranean Region	
2	Severan Bridge	Cendere Köprüsü	Span : 34.2 m (112 ft); Second largest arch ever achieved by the Romans	120 m (390 ft)	Masonry; 2 arches	Kahta Sincik Yolu; Cendere Çayı	2nd century	Burmapınar; 37°55′58.1″N 38°36′30.6″E	Southeastern Anatolia	
3	Eurymedon Bridge (Selge)	Oluk Köprü		14 m (46 ft)	Masonry; 1 arch	Road bridge Köprüçay River	2nd century	Selge; 37°11′31.3″N 31°10′51.9″E	Mediterranean Region	
4	Penkalas Bridge	Penkalas Köprüsü			Masonry; 5 arches	Road bridge Cumhuriyet Cd; Penkalas	2nd century	Çavdarhisar; 39°12′03.1″N 29°36′44.3″E	Aegean Region	
5	Bridge near Limyra	Kırkgöz Kemeri	One of the oldest segmented arch bridges in the world Span : 15 m (49 ft)	360 m (1,180 ft)	Masonry; 28 arches	Footbridge; Alakır Çayı	3rd century	Limyra; 36°20′56.0″N 30°12′23.6″E	Mediterranean Region	
6	Valens Aqueduct	Bozdoğan Kemeri		971 m (3,186 ft)	Masonry; 2 levels, 86 arches	Aqueduct	368	Istanbul; Fatih; 41°00′57.7″N 28°57′20.4″E	Marmara	
7	Macestus Bridge in ruins	Sultançayır Köprüsü	Span : 14.2 m (47 ft)	234 m (768 ft)	Masonry; 13 arches	Out of order Simav River	4th century	Susurluk; 39°51′55.7″N 28°09′54.6″E	Marmara	
8	Aesepus Bridge in ruins	Güvercin Köprüsü	Span : 12.2 m (40 ft)	158 m (518 ft)	Masonry; 11 arches	Out of order Aesepus River	4th century	Ulukır; 40°16′03.0″N 27°36′08.1″E	Marmara	
9	Misis Bridge	Misis Köprüsü		133 m (436 ft)	Masonry; 9 arches	Road bridge Ceyhan River	4th century	Mopsuestia; 36°57′24.3″N 35°37′33.2″E	Mediterranean Region	
10	Sangarius Bridge	Justinianos Köprüsü	Span : 24.5 m (80 ft)	429 m (1,407 ft)	Masonry; 12 arches	Sakarya River	562	Adapazarı; 40°44′14.6″N 30°22′22.8″E	Marmara	
11	Karamagara Bridge submerged under Keban Dam reservoir	Karamağara Köprüsü	Possibly earliest known pointed arch bridge Span : 17 m (56 ft)		Masonry; 1 arch	Out of order Arapgir Çayı	6th century	Ağın - Demirçarık; 38°55′29.9″N 38°39′30.6″E	Eastern Anatolia	
12	Baç Bridge	Baç Köprüsü		60 m (200 ft)	Masonry; 3 arches	Footbridge; Berdan River	6th century	Tarsus; 36°55′16.4″N 34°55′03.8″E	Mediterranean Region	
13	Şekerpınarı Bridge	Şekerpınarı Köprüsü	Span : 10.3 m (34 ft)	83 m (272 ft)	Masonry; 1 arch	Çakıtsuyu Creek		Ulukışla - Alpu; 37°28′15.5″N 34°51′43.1″E	Central Anatolia; Mediterranean Region	
14	Taşköprü (Adana)	Taşköprü		310 m (1,020 ft)	Masonry; 14 arches	Seyhan River	9th century	Adana; 36°59′10.5″N 35°20′05.9″E	Mediterranean Region	
15	Dicle Bridge	Dicle Köprüsü		178 m (584 ft)	Masonry; 10 arches	Footbridge; Tigris	1067	Diyarbakır; 37°53′13.8″N 40°13′43.5″E	Southeastern Anatolia	
16	Old Bridge, Hasankeyf in ruins	Eski Köprü	Span : 40 m (130 ft)	200 m (660 ft)	Masonry; 4 arches	Out of order Tigris	1116	Hasankeyf; 37°42′51.8″N 41°24′39.8″E	Southeastern Anatolia	
17	Malabadi Bridge	Malabadi Köprüsü	Span : 38.6 m (127 ft)	150 m (490 ft)	Masonry; 1 arch	Footbridge; Batman River	1147	Silvan; 38°09′13.2″N 41°12′14.0″E	Southeastern Anatolia	
18	Çobandede Bridge	Çobandede Köprüsü		220 m (720 ft)	Masonry; 6 arches	Aras (river)	1298	Köprüköy; 39°58′12.0″N 41°53′18.4″E	Eastern Anatolia	
19	Eurymedon Bridge (Aspendos)	Köprüpazar Köprüsü		259 m (850 ft)	Masonry; 9 arches	Footbridge; Köprüçay River	13th century	Aspendos; 36°54′51.2″N 31°09′47.3″E	Mediterranean Region	
20	Akköprü	Akköprü			Masonry; 7 arches	Footbridge; Ankara River	13th century	Ankara; 39°57′14.0″N 32°49′56.6″E	Central Anatolia	
21	Akhurian River Bridge in ruins	Ani Arpaçayı Köprüsü	Armenia–Turkey border Span : 30 m (98 ft)		Masonry; 1 arch	Out of order Akhurian River	13th century	Ani; 40°30′15.4″N 43°34′22.6″E	Eastern Anatolia; Armenia	
22	Gazi Mihal Bridge	Gazi Mihal Köprüsü			Masonry; 16 arches	Tundzha	13th century	Edirne; 41°40′36.0″N 26°32′30.2″E	Marmara	
23	Uzunköprü Bridge	Uzun köprü	Longest stone arch bridge in Turkey	1,392 m (4,567 ft)	Masonry; 174 arches	Road bridge Edirne Çanakkale Yolu; Ergene	1443	Uzunköprü; 41°16′39.7″N 26°40′30.2″E	Marmara	
24	Fatih Bridge	Fatih Köprüsü			Masonry; 3 arches	Road bridge Tundzha	1452	Edirne; 41°41′24.7″N 26°33′23.0″E	Marmara	
25	Şahruh Bridge	Şahruh Köprüsü		161 m (528 ft)	Masonry; 8 arches	Road bridge Kızılırmak River	15th century	Sarıoğlan; 39°11′02.1″N 35°56′14.4″E	Central Anatolia	
26	Kanuni Bridge	Kanuni Köprüsü	Conception by Mimar Sinan	60 m (200 ft)	Masonry; 4 arches	Road bridge Tundzha	1554	Edirne; 41°41′13.9″N 26°33′31.2″E	Marmara	
27	Küçükçekmece Bridge	Küçükçekmece Köprüsü	Conception by Mimar Sinan	227 m (745 ft)	Masonry; 13 arches	Footbridge; Lake Küçükçekmece	1560	Istanbul; Küçükçekmece; 40°59′19.8″N 28°46′12.1″E	Marmara	
28	Kanuni Sultan Suleiman bridge	Kanuni Sultan Süleyman Köprüsü	Conception by Mimar Sinan	636 m (2,087 ft)	Masonry; 28 arches	Büyükçekmece	1567	Büyükçekmece; 41°01′18.7″N 28°34′14.2″E	Marmara	
29	Yalnızgöz Bridge	Yalnızgöz Köprüsü			Masonry	Road bridge Tundzha	1570	Edirne; 41°40′58.2″N 26°32′47.6″E	Marmara	
30	Tunca Bridge	Tunca Köprüsü		136 m (446 ft)	Masonry; 12 arches	Road bridge Tundzha	1615	Edirne; 41°40′04.3″N 26°33′15.1″E	Marmara	
31	Irgandı Bridge	Irgandı Köprüsü	Built-on bridge		Masonry; 1 arch	Footbridge; Gökdere		Bursa; 40°10′54.8″N 29°04′14.9″E	Marmara	
32	İncekaya Aqueduct	İncekaya su Kemeri	Height : 60 m (200 ft)	116 m (381 ft)	Masonry; 1 main arch	Aqueduct; Tokatlı Canyon	18th century	Safranbolu; 41°16′56.0″N 32°41′06.3″E	Black Sea Region	
33	Meriç Bridge	Mecidiye Köprüsü		263 m (863 ft)	Masonry; 12 arches	Road bridge Maritsa	1842	Edirne; 41°39′48.6″N 26°33′07.8″E	Marmara	
34	Çifte Bridge	Çifte Köprü	Moon bridges	35 m (115 ft)	Masonry; 1 arch Twin bridges	Footbridge; Orçi Stream; Arhavi Creek	19th century	Küçükköy; 41°16′34.8″N 41°22′32.9″E	Black Sea Region	
35	Varda Viaduct	Varda Köprüsü	Span : 30 m (98 ft) (x3); Height : 98 m (322 ft)	172 m (564 ft)	Masonry; 3 main arches, 8 secondary arches	Berlin–Baghdad railway Çakıt Deresi	1916	Karaisalı; 37°14′35.1″N 34°58′36.3″E	Mediterranean Region	
36	Atatürk Bridge	Atatürk Köprüsü		477 m (1,565 ft)	Beam; Steel	Atatürk Boulevard - Refik Saydam Cd; Golden Horn	1940	Istanbul; Fatih - Beyoğlu; 41°01′26.7″N 28°57′53.7″E	Marmara	
37	Birecik Bridge	Birecik Köprüsü	One of the 50 Fifty civil engineering feats in Turkey	695 m (2,280 ft)	Arch; 5 concrete deck arches	D.400; Euphrates	1956	Birecik; 37°01′34.2″N 37°58′26.1″E	Southeastern Anatolia	
38	Galata Bridge	Galata Köprüsü	Market area on the first floor	465 m (1,526 ft)	Beam; Steel; 2 levels Bascule bridge	Ragıp Gümüşpala Cd - Kemeraltı Cd; T1 (Istanbul Tram); Golden Horn	1994	Istanbul; Fatih - Beyoğlu; 41°01′12.0″N 28°58′23.5″E	Marmara	

== Major road bridges ==
This table presents a non-exhaustive list of the road and railway bridges with spans greater than 100 metres (328 ft) or total lengths longer than 5,000 metres (16,404 ft).

	Name	Turkish	Span	Length	Type	Carries Crosses	Opened	Location	Region	Ref.
1	1915 Çanakkale Bridge	1915 Çanakkale Köprüsü	2,023 m (6,637 ft)	4,608 m (15,118 ft)	Suspension; Steel box girder deck, steel pylons 770+2023+770	Otoyol 6 Dardanelles Strait	2022	Gelibolu–Lapseki; 40°20′20.3″N 26°38′13.7″E	Marmara	(Note: Since completion in 2022, the 1915 Çanakkale Bridge has the longest span in the world, surpassing the Akashi Kaikyō Bridge in Japan who held the record since 1998.)
2	Osman Gazi Bridge	Osmangazi Köprüsü	1,550 m (5,090 ft)	2,682 m (8,799 ft)	Suspension; Steel box girder deck, steel pylons 566+1550+566	Otoyol 5 Gulf of İzmit	2016	Gebze–Altınova; 40°45′17.7″N 29°30′56.2″E	Marmara	
3	Yavuz Sultan Selim Bridge	Yavuz Sultan Selim Köprüsü	1,408 m (4,619 ft)	2,164 m (7,100 ft)	Suspension with cable-stays Steel box girder deck, concrete pylons 2x60+71+1408+71 +2x60	Otoyol 7 Double-track railway Bosporus	2016	Garipçe–Poyrazköy; 41°12′11.3″N 29°06′41.5″E	Marmara	
4	Fatih Sultan Mehmet Bridge	Fatih Sultan Mehmet Köprüsü	1,090 m (3,580 ft)	1,090 m (3,580 ft)	Suspension; Steel box girder deck, steel pylons	Otoyol 2 European route E80; Bosporus	1988	Istanbul; Sarıyer–Beykoz; 41°05′28.9″N 29°03′41.4″E	Marmara	
5	Bosphorus Bridge	Boğaziçi Köprüsü	1,074 m (3,524 ft)	1,560 m (5,120 ft)	Suspension; Steel box girder deck, steel pylons	Otoyol 1 Bosporus	1973	Istanbul; Beşiktaş–Üsküdar; 41°02′44.4″N 29°02′05.5″E	Marmara	
6	Sazlıdere Bridge under construction	Sazlıdere Köprüsü	440 m (1,440 ft)	1,617 m (5,305 ft)	Cable-stayed; Composite steel/concrete deck, concrete pylons 75+135+440+135+75	Otoyol 7 Section 8 Istanbul Canal; Sazlıdere		Şahintepe; 41°06′16.5″N 28°43′11.8″E	Marmara	
7	Nissibi Bridge	Nissibi Köprüsü	400 m (1,300 ft)	610 m (2,000 ft)	Cable-stayed; Steel box girder deck, concrete pylons 35+40+30+400+30 +40+35	State road D.360; Euphrates	2015	Korulu–Mezra; 37°53′55.5″N 38°58′28.2″E	Southeastern Anatolia	
8	New Kömürhan Bridge	Yeni Kömürhan Köprüsü	380 m (1,250 ft)	660 m (2,170 ft)	Cable-stayed; Steel box girder deck, concrete pylon 180+380	State road D.300; Euphrates	2021	Baskil–Kale; 38°26′25.9″N 38°49′07.7″E	Eastern Anatolia	
9	Ağın Bridge	Ağın Köprüsü	280 m (920 ft)	520 m (1,710 ft)	Cable-stayed; Steel box girder deck, steel pylons 120+280+120	Road bridge Ağın Yolu; Lake Keban	2015	Ağın–Demirçarık; 38°54′54.3″N 38°39′46.1″E	Eastern Anatolia	
10	İzmir Bay Crossing Bridge project	İzmir Körfez Geçişi Köprüsü	270 m (890 ft)	3,585 m (11,762 ft)	Cable-stayed; Concrete box girder deck, concrete pylons Twin bridges 2x50+60+270+60 +2x50	Road bridge Gulf of İzmir		İzmir; 38°26′20.2″N 27°01′27.1″E	Aegean	
11	Güreşen Bridge under construction	Güreşen Köprüsü	270 m (890 ft)	360 m (1,180 ft)	Cable-stayed; Concrete pylon 270+90	Road bridge Çoruh river		Güreşen; 41°25′53.2″N 41°42′11.3″E	Black Sea Region	
12	Çamlıca Bridge under construction	Çamlıca Köprüsü	230 m (750 ft)	350 m (1,150 ft)	Box girder Prestressed concrete V-shaped legs	State road D.340		Ermenek; 36°37′10.9″N 33°00′58.2″E	Mediterranean Region	
13	Beğendik Bridge	Beğendik Köprüsü	210 m (690 ft)	450 m (1,480 ft)	Box girder Prestressed concrete 120+210+120	Road bridge Uluçay	2019	Beğendik; 37°57′53.4″N 42°38′57.0″E	Eastern Anatolia	
14	Gökdere Viaduct project	Gökdere Viyadüğü	210 m (690 ft)	650 m (2,130 ft)	Extradosed; Concrete box girder deck, concrete pylons 130+210+130	Palu–Gökdere road Murat River; Beyhan I Dam reservoir		Gökdere; 38°44′11.5″N 40°12′05.6″E	Eastern Anatolia	
15	Kılıç Arslan II Bridge under construction	Kılıç Arslan II Köprüsü	205 m (673 ft) (x2)	410 m (1,350 ft)	Cable-stayed; Concrete box girder deck, concrete pylon 205+205	Road bridge Göksu		Silifke; 36°23′57.8″N 33°50′30.1″E	Mediterranean Region	
16	Beylerderesi Viaduct	Beylerderesi Viyadüğü	190 m (620 ft)	420 m (1,380 ft)	Box girder Prestressed concrete 115+190+115	State road D.300; Beyler Creek	2011	Malatya; 38°20′20.4″N 38°12′33.6″E	Eastern Anatolia	
17	Golden Horn Metro Bridge	Haliç Metro Köprüsü	180 m (590 ft)	947 m (3,107 ft)	Cable-stayed; Steel box girder deck, steel pylons 90+180+90; Swing bridge	Istanbul Metro (line 2); Golden Horn	2014	Istanbul; Fatih–Beyoğlu; 41°01′22.1″N 28°58′00.4″E	Marmara	
18	Çayırhan Bridge under construction	Çayırhan Viyadüğü	176 m (577 ft)	270 m (890 ft)	Box girder Prestressed concrete V-shaped legs	State road D.140		Davutoğlan, Nallıhan; 40°06′14.0″N 31°35′45.7″E	Black Sea Region	
19	Second Karababa Bridge under construction	Karababa Köprüsü	175 m (574 ft)	395 m (1,296 ft)	Box girder Prestressed concrete Twin bridges 110+175+110	State road D.875; Euphrates		Karapınar, Şanlıurfa–Damlıca, Adıyaman; 37°27′56.1″N 38°15′47.8″E	Southeastern Anatolia	
20	Tekkale Viaduct	Tekkale Viyadüğü	175 m (574 ft) (x2)	628 m (2,060 ft)	Box girder Prestressed concrete 137+175+165+97	State road D.050; Çoruh river Yusufeli Dam reservoir	2022	Tekkale; 40°47′24.3″N 41°30′57.3″E	Black Sea Region	
21	Eğiste Viaduct	Eğiste Viyadüğü	170 m (560 ft) (x7)	1,372 m (4,501 ft)	Box girder Prestressed concrete 91+170x7+91	Road bridge Göksu	2020	Eğiste; 37°06′23.8″N 32°27′56.4″E	Mediterranean Region	
22	Ayvacık Eynel Arch Bridge	Ayvacık Eynel Köprüsü	168 m (551 ft)		Arch; Steel deck arch	Road bridge Yeşilırmak	2009	Ayvacık–Eynel; 40°59′26.7″N 36°38′08.0″E	Black Sea Region	
23	Second Hasankeyf Bridge	Hasankeyf 2 Köprüsü	168 m (551 ft) (x3)	1,001 m (3,284 ft)	Box girder Prestressed concrete 91+168x3+86	Road bridge Tigris	2019	Hasankeyf; 37°43′48.0″N 41°27′21.0″E	Southeastern Anatolia	
24	Gülburnu Viaduct	Gülburnu Viyadüğü	165 m (541 ft)	330 m (1,080 ft)	Box girder Prestressed concrete 82+165+82	State road D.010	2008	Gülburnu; 40°57′47.3″N 38°39′19.0″E	Black Sea Region	
25	Budan Bridge	Budan Köprüsü	165 m (541 ft)	350 m (1,150 ft)	Box girder Prestressed concrete 92+165+92	State road D.950; Çoruh river	2011	Dokuzoğul–Dikmenli; 41°02′23.3″N 41°48′07.1″E	Black Sea Region	
26	Berta Bridge	Berta Köprüsü	165 m (541 ft)	340 m (1,120 ft)	Box girder Prestressed concrete	State road D.010; Okçular Creek	2012	Hamamlı–Avcılar; 41°09′57.7″N 41°58′17.2″E	Black Sea Region	
27	Şilenkar Viaduct	Şilenkar Viyadüğü	165 m (541 ft) (x2)	530 m (1,740 ft)	Box girder Prestressed concrete 100+2x165+100	State road D.950; Oltu Stream; Yusufeli Dam reservoir	2022	İşhan; 40°46′17.8″N 41°43′00.1″E	Black Sea Region	
28	Yusufeli Dam Viaduct	Yusufeli Baraj Viyadüğü	165 m (541 ft)	345 m (1,132 ft)	Box girder Prestressed concrete 90+165+90	State road D.050; Çoruh river Artvin Dam reservoir	2022	Sebzeciler; 40°50′04.3″N 41°40′00.7″E	Black Sea Region	
29	Şehzadeler Viaduct	Amasya Şehzadeler Viyadüğü	160 m (520 ft) (x2)	490 m (1,610 ft)	Box girder Prestressed concrete Twin bridges 85+2x160+85	Amasya Ring Road	2017	Amasya; 40°39′08.1″N 35°47′06.0″E	Black Sea Region	
30	Derevenk Viaduct	Derevenk Viyadüğü	160 m (520 ft)	330 m (1,080 ft)	Box girder Prestressed concrete Twin bridges 85+160+85	Road bridge	2019	Talas; 38°41′11.4″N 35°35′04.8″E	Central Anatolia	
31	Kanyonpark Bridge	Kanyonpark Köprüsü	159 m (522 ft)	329 m (1,079 ft)	Arch; Steel deck arch	Road bridge Kanyon Park	2017	Safranbolu–Karabük; 41°14′27.7″N 32°40′04.4″E	Black Sea Region	
32	Bayındır Dam Bridge	Bayındır Baraji Köprüsü	147 m (482 ft)	399 m (1,309 ft)	Box girder Steel; Twin bridges 73+147+73	Otoyol 20; Ankara Ring Road; Bayındır Dam reservoir	1997	Ankara; 39°54′46.1″N 33°00′06.5″E	Central Anatolia	
33	Çubuk Dam Bridge	Çubuk Barajı Köprüsü	147 m (482 ft)	293 m (961 ft)	Box girder Steel; Twin bridges 73+147+73	Otoyol 20; Ankara Ring Road; Çubuk Stream; Çubuk-1 Dam reservoir	1996	Ankara; 40°00′35.3″N 32°56′09.2″E	Central Anatolia	
34	Haliç Bridge	Haliç Köprüsü	139 m (456 ft)	995 m (3,264 ft)	Box girder Steel; Twin bridges 112+108+126+108 +138+81+105	Otoyol 1 Golden Horn	1974; 1996	Istanbul; Fatih–Beyoğlu; 41°02′36.7″N 28°56′30.3″E	Marmara	
35	Kömürhan Bridge	Kömürhan Köprüsü	135 m (443 ft)	287 m (942 ft)	Box girder Concrete; 76+135+76	State road D.300; Euphrates	1986	Baskil–Kale; 38°26′26.9″N 38°49′04.9″E	Eastern Anatolia	
36	Cengiz Trabzon Başarköy Bridge 3 under construction	Cengiz Trabzon Başarköy Köprüsü 3	134 m (440 ft) (x2)	432 m (1,417 ft)	Box girder Prestressed concrete Twin bridges 82+2x134+82	State road D.885; European route E97		Dikkaya; 40°42′20.4″N 39°29′57.7″E	Black Sea Region	
37	Akarsın Bridge	Akarsın Köprüsü	132 m (433 ft)	275 m (902 ft)	Box girder Prestressed concrete	State road D.950; Çoruh river	2011	Zeytincik; 41°00′20.2″N 41°46′21.2″E	Black Sea Region	
38	Imrahor Viaduct	İmrahor Viyadüğü	115 m (377 ft) (x4)	604 m (1,982 ft)	Box girder Prestressed concrete 72+4x115+72	Road bridge Doğukent Cd; Imrahor Valley	1998	Ankara; 39°53′21.7″N 32°54′26.0″E	Central Anatolia	
39	Nurdağı Viaduct	Nurdağı Viyadüğü	110 m (360 ft)	825 m (2,707 ft)	Box girder Steel	Otoyol 52	1998	Nurdağı; 37°10′44.6″N 36°42′20.0″E	Southeastern Anatolia	
40	Sakarya Bridge	Sakarya Köprüsü	110 m (360 ft)	260 m (850 ft)	Box girder Prestressed concrete Twin bridges 65+110+85	Otoyol 7 Sakarya River		Adapazarı; 40°48′41.4″N 30°26′50.0″E	Marmara	
41	İsmet Pasha Bridge submerged under Karakaya Dam reservoir	İsmet Pasha Köprüsü	109 m (358 ft)		Arch; Concrete deck	Road bridge Euphrates	1932	Baskil–Kale; 38°26′28.1″N 38°49′03.3″E	Eastern Anatolia	
42	Karataş Bridge	Karataş Köprüsü	105 m (344 ft) (x5)	588 m (1,929 ft)	Box girder Steel; Twin bridges 84+4x105+84	Otoyol 20; Ankara Ring Road; Karataş Valley	1998	Ankara; 39°49′26.9″N 32°52′47.2″E	Central Anatolia	
43	Şehitler Bridge	Şehitler Köprüsü	105 m (344 ft) (x7)	1,669 m (5,476 ft)	Box girder Steel; 75+7x105+72	Road bridge Seyhan River	2023	Adana; 37°01′54.5″N 35°20′16.4″E	Mediterranean Region	
44	Ormanköy-Akyazı-Dokurcun Viaduct 3 under construction	Ormanköy-Akyazı-Dokurcun Viyadüğü 3	102 m (335 ft) (x3)	440 m (1,440 ft)	Box girder Prestressed concrete Twin bridges 67+3x102+67	State road D.140		Akyazı; 40°35′33.0″N 30°43′09.4″E	Marmara	
45	Zeynel Şenol Bridge	Zeynel Şenol Köprüsü	101 m (331 ft)	202 m (663 ft)	Cable-stayed; Steel beam deck, steel pylon 101+101	Road bridge Manavgat River	2008	Manavgat; 36°47′37.4″N 31°26′36.8″E	Mediterranean Region	
46	Dikmen Valley Arch Bridge	Dikmen Vadi Köprüsü		180 m (590 ft)	Arch; Steel deck arch	Road bridge Dikmen Valley	2008	Ankara; 39°52′51.6″N 32°50′49.5″E	Central Anatolia	

== List of bridges by length ==
The top ten longest bridges in Turkey by total span.

Name	Length		Completed	Traffic	Province(s)
Name	m	ft	Completed	Traffic	Province(s)
Çanakkale 1915 Bridge; Otoyol 6 Current longest bridge of any type in Turkey	4,608	15,118	2022	Motorway	Çanakkale
Osman Gazi Bridge; Otoyol 5	2,682	8,799	2010	Motorway	Kocaeli/Yalova
Bornova Viaduct; Otoyol 30; Longest bridge not crossing a body of water in Turkey	2,328	7,638	2007	Motorway	İzmir
Mt. Bolu Viaduct No. 1 Otoyol 4	2,272	7,454	2006	Motorway	Bolu
Sakarya Viaduct; Ankara-Istanbul high-speed railway Longest railway bridge and longest bridge crossing a river in Turkey	2,233	7,326	2008	High-speed rail	Ankara
Yavuz Sultan Selim Bridge; Otoyol 7	2,164	7,100	2016	Motorway	Istanbul
Karasu Viaduct; Otoyol 3	2,160	7,090	1990	Motorway	Istanbul
Battalgazi Bridge; Fevzipaşa-Kuratalan railway	2,030	6,660	1986	Railway	Malatya/Elazığ
Çatalan Bridge; Göl Kenarı Road; Longest road bridge not carrying a motorway in Turkey	1,575	5,167	1998	Roadway	Adana
Bosphorus Bridge; Otoyol 1	1,560	5,120	1973	Motorway	Istanbul
Fatih Sultan Mehmet Bridge; Otoyol 2	1,510	4,950	1988	Motorway	Istanbul

== See also ==
- Transport in Turkey
- Rail transport in Turkey
- General Directorate of Highways (Turkey)
- List of highways in Turkey
- List of Roman bridges
- List of aqueducts in the Roman Empire
- Geography of Turkey
- List of rivers of Turkey
- List of bridges in Ankara
- Türkiye'deki tarihi köprüler (in Turkish) - Historic bridges in Turkey

== Notes and references ==
- Notes
- "TMMOB İnşaat Mühendisleri Odası" [TMNBO Construction Engineers Room]. imo.org.tr (in Turkish).
  - "Su Yapısı Olarak Anadolu'daki Taş Köprüler" [Stone Bridge in Anatolia as a Water Structure] (PDF).
- Nicolas Janberg. "International Database for Civil and Structural Engineering". Structurae.com.
- Other references
