= Cataluña (disambiguation) =

Cataluña is the Spanish name for Catalonia (Catalan: Catalunya), a part of the Iberian Peninsula in the Mediterranean Sea.

Cataluña also may refer to:

- Spanish ship Cataluña, more than one Spanish Navy ship
- Cataluña (Albéniz), a composition by Isaac Albéniz, 1899.

== See also ==
- Wikipedia:WikiProject Catalan-speaking countries
- Catalunya (disambiguation)
- Catalan (disambiguation)
- History of Catalonia
- Northern Catalonia, Catalan-speaking region in France
- Hotel Catalonia (disambiguation)
