= Bridges of Edirne =

The Bridges of Edirne are a series of bridges from the Ottoman period at Edirne in Turkey, approximately 240 km (150 miles) to the west of Istanbul.

== Introduction ==
Edirne, which was the Turkish capital till 1453, is positioned on the main transit route linking Europe and Asia Minor. Because the older part of city is positioned inside a large semi-circular loop in the Tundzha River, which at this point is wide but usually shallow, several stone arch bridges have been built to cross it to the north, west and south of the city. Starting from the north, and following the river's flow in an anti-clockwise direction, these bridges are as follows:

== Fatih Bridge ==
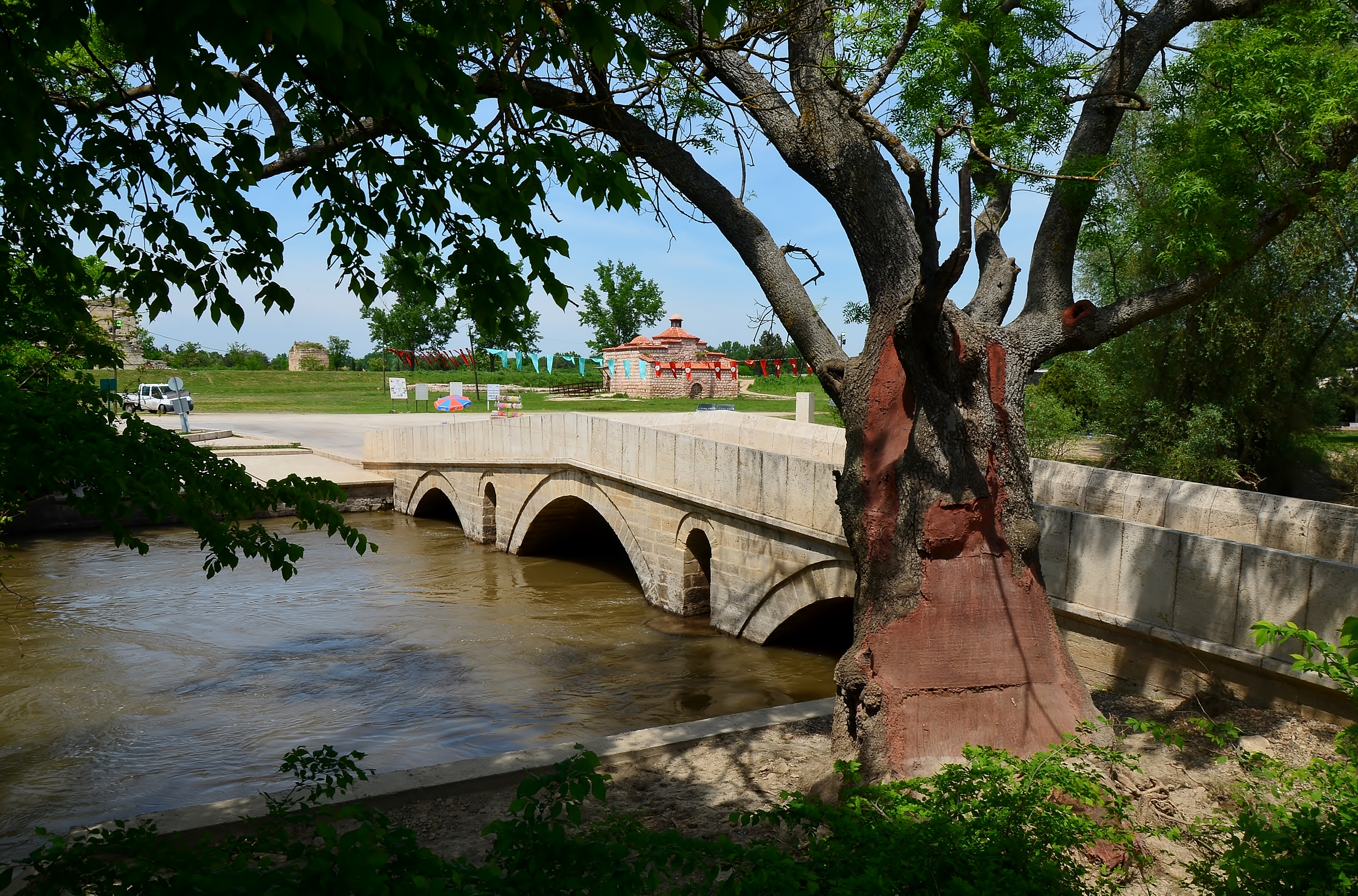
Fatih Bridge (May 2015)

The Fatih Bridge ("Fatih Fatih Köprüsü") linked the Sultan's Palace identified by the Adalet Tower ("Adalet Kasrı") with the city. Most of the palace, which was built on a large island in the river, was destroyed in the nineteenth century but the tower remains in the Palace Gardens, which here form a large sandy island separating two branches of the river.

The Fatih Bridge was built in 1452 during the reign of Mehmed II. The stone structure comprises three broad very slightly pointed arches, of which the middles arch is slightly larger than the other two. The three main arches are separated by two broad pillars each of which itself contains a narrow opening. Beneath the narrow openings the pillars of the bridge are supported on each side by stone buttresses with an approximately triangular footprint, designed to divert the main river current away from the pillars and under the arches: however, these are below the water level in the attached picture, which was taken in May when the water level can be relatively high.

- Location: 41°41′24.797717″N 26°33′22.890015″E

== Kanuni Bridge ==
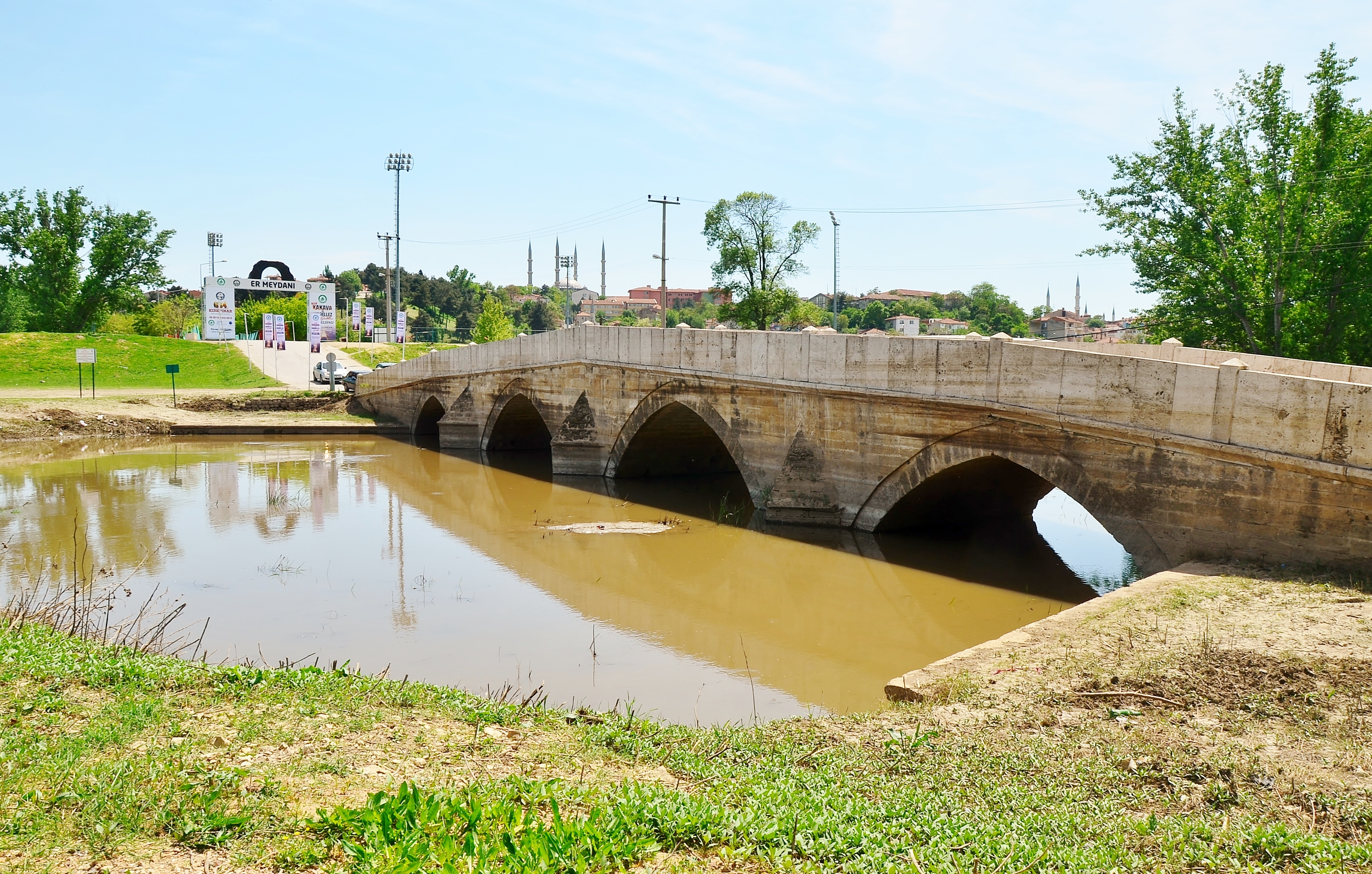
Kanuni Bridge (May 2015)

The Kanuni Bridge ("Kanuni Köprüsü") takes its name, like several important bridges in Turkey, from Suleiman the Magnificent (also known in Turkey as Suleiman Kanuni/Suleiman the Law Giver). It continues in a northerly direction the same route as the Fatih Bridge, crossing from the Palace Gardens Island in the middle of the river to the river's north shore.

The Kanuni Bridge was built in 1553/54 during the reign of Suleiman the Magnificent by the prolific architect and civil engineer Mimar Sinan. The bridge is a long gently vaulted structure over four very slightly pointed arches the lower portions of which are normally below the water surface, so that the visible parts of the arches appear very shallow. In contrast with the design of the Fatih Bridge of the previous century, there is on the Kanuni Bridge no opening in the pillars separating the four main arches. The pillars of the bridge are supported on each side by stone buttresses with an approximately triangular footprint designed to divert the main river current away from the pillars and under the arches.

The bridge is 65 m (213 ft) long including the abutments at each end. Measured without the abutments it is 43 m (141 ft) long.

The Kanuni Bridge was comprehensively restored in 2007.

- Location: 41°41′13.512885″N 26°33′31.367941″E

== Saraçhane Bridge ==
The Saraçhane Bridge ("Saraçhane Köprüsü") is named after the Beylerbey (Commander) of Rumelia. Rumelia was a Turkish province when the bridge was constructed in 1451.

The Saraçhane Bridge is located directly downstream of the Palace Island. It is 120 m (390 ft) long and 5 m (16 ft) wide, crossing the river in a long low vaulted shape, supported by 10 arches of varying sizes.

Like the Kanuni Bridge, the Saraçhane Bridge was comprehensively restored in 2007.

- Location: 41°41′8.147846″N 26°33′15.667362″E

== Yalnizgoz and Bayezid Bridges ==
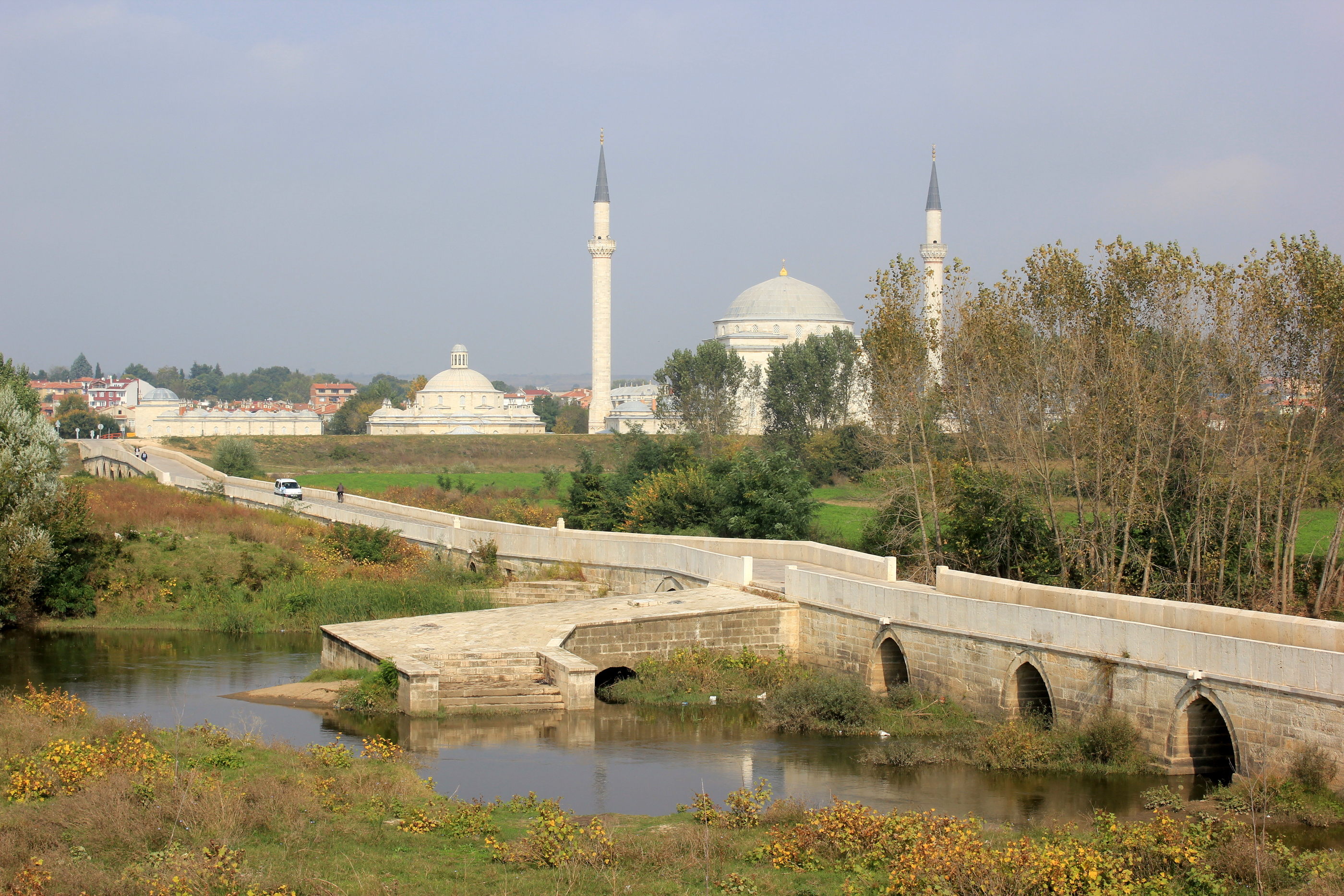
Western section of the Yalnizgoz Bridge, with the Bayezid Bridge in the background (October 2014)

The Yalnızgöz Bridge ("Yalnızgöz Köprüsü") and the Bayezid Bridge ("Bayezid Köprüsü") to is west link the Sultan Bayezid II Külliye (mosque complex) with the city. The Bayezid Bridge is named after Bayezid II. The bridges are separated from one other by a small low sandy island in the middle of the river along which a stone causeway is routed. The Bayezid Bridge is the more substantial of the two.

The Bayezid Bridge spans the main branch of the river, with 6 arches. It dates from 1488 and was the work of Mimar Hayreddin.

The Yalnızgöz Bridge spans the lesser branch of the river and is part dam, part bridge. Along its length there is a single main arch, along with seven small arched openings. Most of the facade of the bridge comprises a stone dam wall, however, intended to regulate he river's propensity to sudden flooding. The Yalnizgoz Bridge was constructed in 1567. It was, like the Kanuni Bridge, the work of Mimar Sinan.

- Location Bayezid Bridge: 41°41′3.590375″N 26°32′38.743″E
- Location Yalnizgoz Bridge: 41°40′57.79245″N 26°32′48.012714″E

== Gazi-Mihal Bridge ==
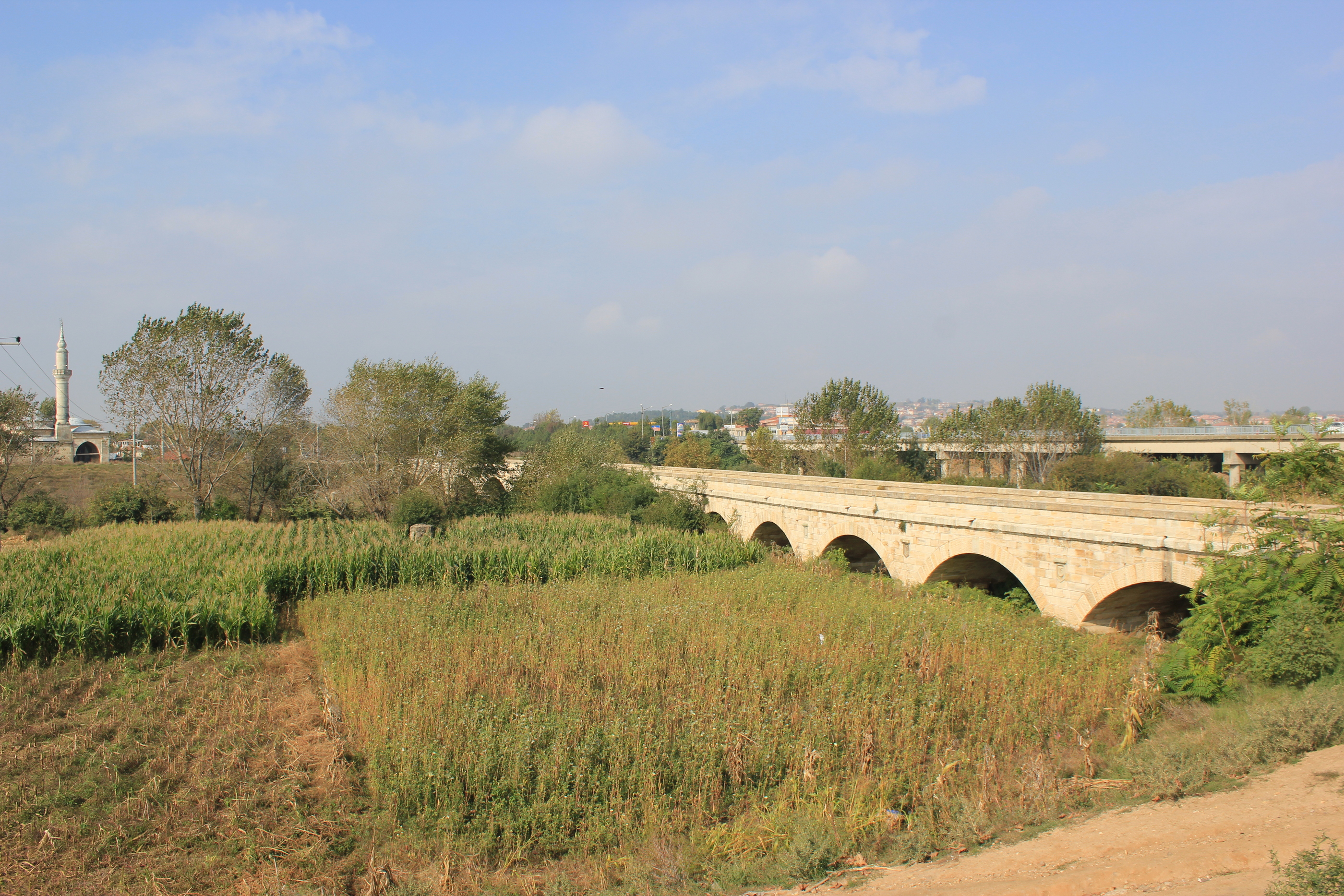
Gazi Mihal Bridge, with the twentieth century steel-concrete road bridge in the background (October 2014)

The Gazi Mihal Bridge ("Gazi Mihal Köprüsü") carried the main road from the centre of Edirne towards the west. It marks the location of an earlier Roman bridge of which only a few stones remain. During the fifteenth century a bridge was built at this point by the frontier warlord Mihal Bey. This was replaced in the nineteenth century by the present stone bridge, complemented during the twentieth century by a steel and concrete road bridge which runs parallel to the nineteenth-century bridge on its north side, and carries the modern D100 highway en route to the present frontier with Bulgaria.

The nineteenth century stone bridge covers a span of 190 m (620 ft), and consists of a series of stone arches.

- Location: 41°40′35.810939″N 26°32′29.975395″E

== Rail bridge ==
- a twentieth-century steel bridge a few hundred meters to the south of the Gazi Mihal Bridge carries the railway line across the Tundzha towards Bulgaria.

== Ekmekcioglu Ahmet Pasha Bridge ==
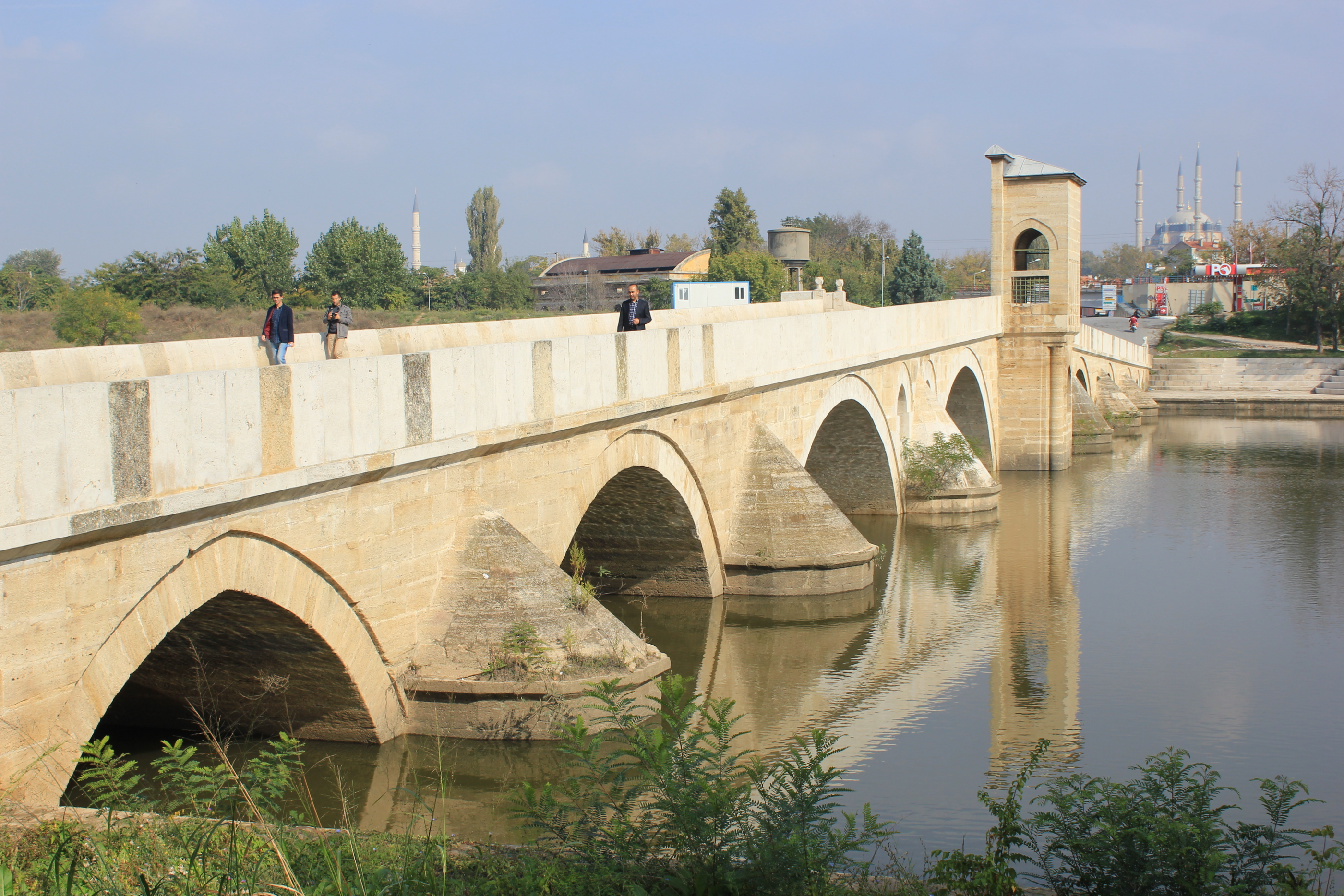
Ekmekcioglu Ahmet Pasha Bridge

The Ekmekcioglu Ahmet Pasha across the Tundzha River (often simply called the Tundzha Bridge) connects the centre of Edirne with the route to the south, today carrying the D100 Highway towards the frontier with the north-eastern tip of Greece. The bridge was originally constructed between 1607 and 1615. It comprises 8 stone arches, and has a total length of 135 m (443 ft). Two of the arches were destroyed during the Second World War and replaced with temporary steel bridging structures. As part of a comprehensive restoration undertaken in 2007 the steel structures were replaced, however, and the bridge was returned to its earlier form.

- Location: 41°40′4.277387″N 26°33′15.049381″E

== Meriç Bridge ==
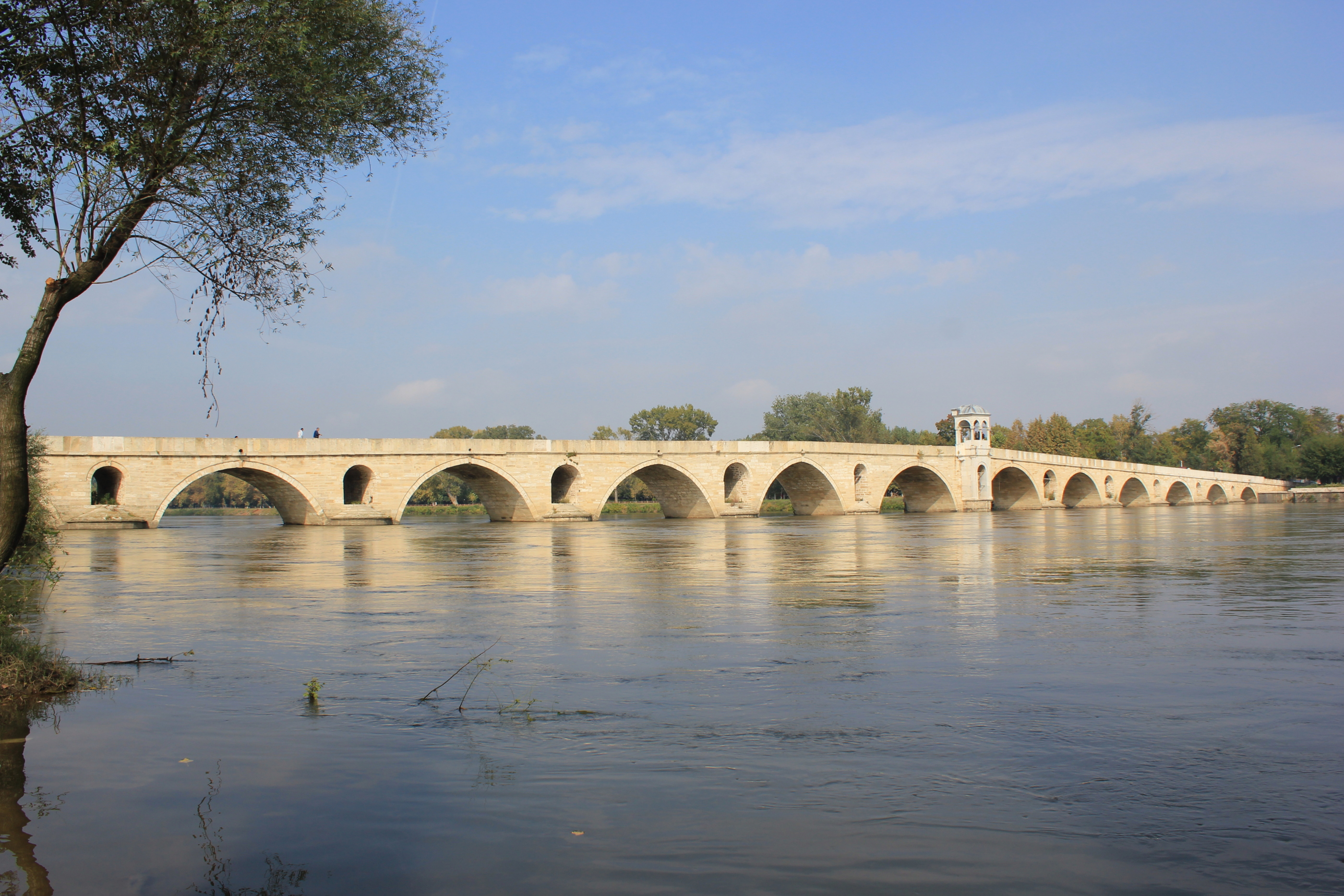
Meriç Bridge

The Meriç Bridge (sometimes known simply as the New Bridge) carries the road from Edirne to Western Thrace to the southwest. It is positioned directly to the south of the Ekmekcioglu Ahmet Pasha Bridge (Tundzha) Bridge. At this point, to the south of Edirne, the Tundzha River which loops around the old city, meets up with the Maritsa (Meriç) River. Directly before the rivers meet, for a couple of hundred meters they flow parallel to each other. It is here that the main highway south out of Edirne crosses both rivers, one after he other, using first the "Tundzha Bridge" and then the "New Bridge".

The 263 m (863 ft) Meriç Bridge was opened in 1842, but its design follows that of the seventeenth century Tundzha Bridge.

- Location: 41°39′48.379158″N 26°33′7.710857″E
