= Catalan =

Catalan may refer to:

== Catalonia ==
From, or related to Catalonia:

- Catalan language, a Romance language
- Catalans, an ethnic group formed by the people from, or with origins in, Northern or southern Catalonia

== Places ==
- 13178 Catalan, asteroid #13178, named "Catalan"
- Catalán (crater), a lunar crater named for Miguel A. Catalán
- Çatalan, İvrindi, a village in Balıkesir province, Turkey
- Çatalan, Karaisalı, a village in Adana Province, Turkey
- Catalan Bay, Gibraltar
- Catalan Sea, more commonly known as the Balearic Sea
- Catalan Mediterranean System, the Catalan Mountains

=== Facilities and structures ===
- Çatalan Bridge, Adana, Turkey
- Çatalan Dam, Adana, Turkey
- Catalan Batteries, Gibraltar

== People ==
- Catalan, Lord of Monaco (1415–1457), Lord of Monaco from 1454 until 1457
- Catalán (surname), people with the surname Catalán
- Arnaut Catalan (1219–1253), troubador
- Eugène Charles Catalan (1814–1894), French and Belgian mathematician
- Moses Chayyim Catalan (died 1661), Italian rabbi

== Mathematics ==
Mathematical concepts named after mathematician Eugène Catalan:

- Catalan numbers, a sequence of natural numbers that occur in various counting problems
- Catalan solids, a family of polyhedra
- Catalan's constant, a number that occurs in estimates in combinatorics
- Catalan's conjecture

== Wine ==
- Catalan (grape), another name for the wine grape Mourvèdre
- Catalan wine, an alternative name used in France for wine made from the Carignan grape
  - Carignan, a wine grape that is also known as Catalan

== Sports and games ==
- Catalan Opening, in chess
- Catalan Open, golf tournament
- Catalans Dragons, a rugby league team often known simply as Catalan
- XIII Catalan, a rugby league team from Perpignan, France

== Other uses ==
- Battle of Catalán (1817) in Uruguay
- Catalan Sheepdog
- Catalan Company, medieval mercenary company
- Catalan vault, architectural design element
- The Catalans, a 1953 novel by Patrick O'Brian

== See also ==
- Catalonia (disambiguation)
- Catalunya (disambiguation)
- Anti-Catalanism
