= Kadıncık =

Kadıncık is a Turkish word. It may refer to:

- Kadıncık, Şereflikoçhisar, a village in Şereflikoçhisar district of Ankara Province, Turkey
- Kadıncık 1 hydroelectric power plant, a power plant in Mersin Province, Turkey
- Kadıncık 2 hydroelectric power plant, a power plant in Mersin Province, Turkey
