= Enerya =

- Native name: Enerya
- Industry: Energy
- Founded: 2003
- Headquarters: Istanbul, Turkey
- Website: Official website

Enerya is the largest private natural gas distribution company in Turkey. It was founded by STFA Group in 2003. Since 2014, Swiss Partners Group holds 30% of its shares. Apart from natural gas distribution, the company is also active in gas and power trading businesses, and has ongoing investments in renewable energy generation.

Enerya operates as the natural gas distributor across 11 towns in Turkey: Antalya, Aydın, Konya, Çorum, Niğde, Nevşehir, Denizli, Karaman, Erzincan, Aksaray and Ereğli. The firm has 1 million subscribers as of 2016.

== See also ==
- STFA Holding
- Partners Group
