= Şahruh Bridge =

Bridge in Turkey

Coordinates: 39°11′03″N 35°56′15″E

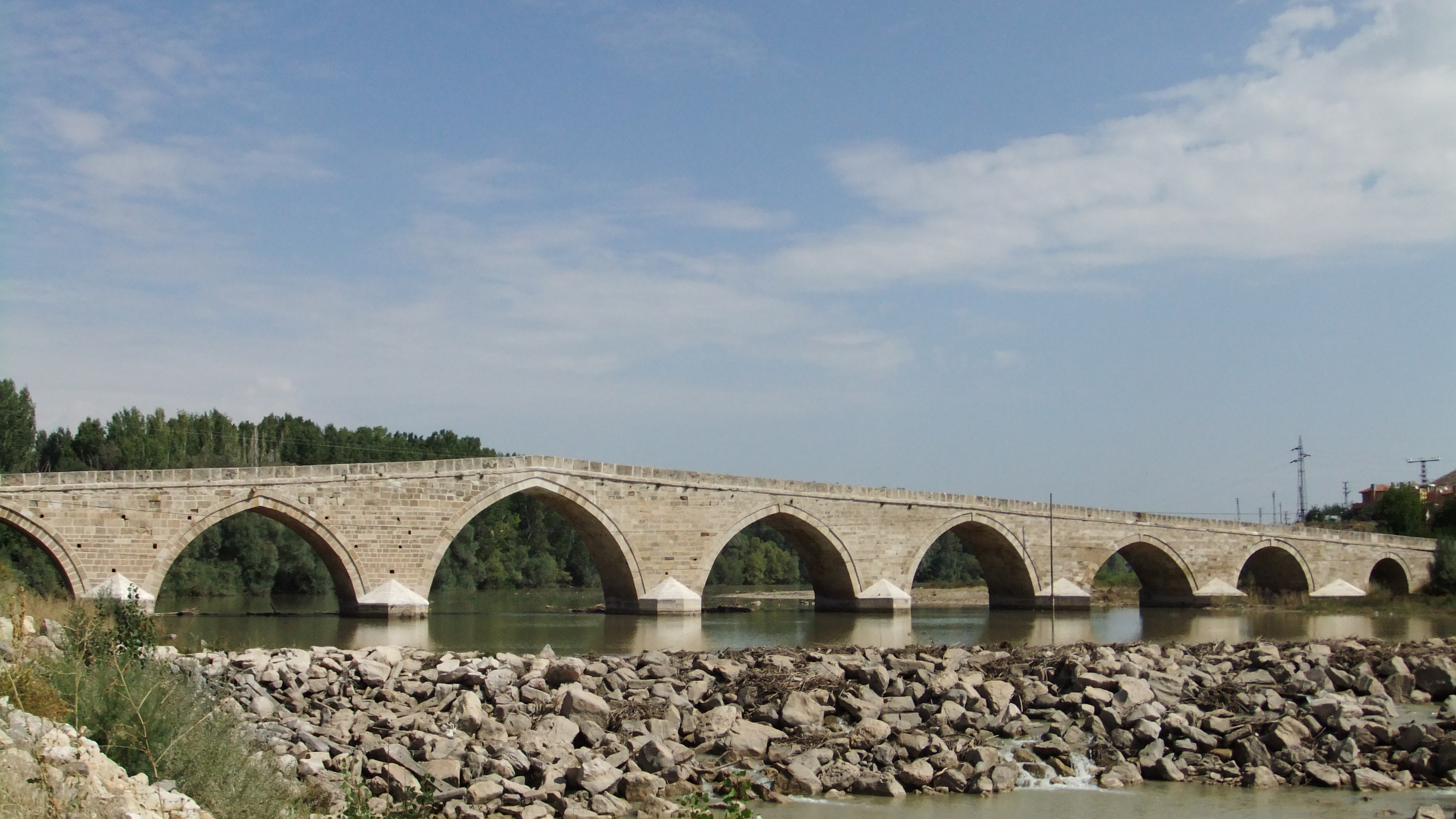
- Şahruh Bridge
- Crosses: Kızılırmak River
- Locale: Near Karaözü, Sarıoğlan, Kayseri Province, Central Anatolia Region, Turkey

Characteristics
- Design: Pointed arch bridge
- Material: Stone

Location
- Interactive map of Şahruh Bridge

Şahruh Bridge is a historical bridge in Turkey located in the village of Karaözü in the Sarıoğlan ilçe (district) of Kayseri province.

There is no record of the construction of the bridge but, according to an inscription about the restoration of the bridge in 1538, it was commissioned by Shahruh of Dulkadirids and was restored by his son Mehmet. Şahruh was the son of Bozkurt of Dulkadir. During a family dispute, Şahruh was punished by his uncle Shah Budak in the 1480s, so the bridge must have been built before 1480.

The arch bridge is over Kızılırmak River ("Halys" in antiquity). Its length is 161 metres (528 ft) and its width is 6.2 metres (20 ft). The highest point of the bridge is 11 metres (36 ft) The bridge is still in use.

== See also ==
- List of bridges in Turkey
