= Kömürhan Bridge =

Bridge that passes Euphrates River between Elazığ and Malatya, Turkey

Kömürhan Bridge Kömürhan Köprüsü
- Coordinates: 38.44068°N 38.81847°E
- Carries: D.300
- Crosses: Euphrates
- Official name: Kömürhan Köprüsü
- Other name: İsmet Paşa Köprüsü

History
- Constructed by: STFA Group
- Construction start: 23 February 1983
- Opened: 8 April 1986
- Closed: 1 January 2021
- Replaces: Old Kömürhan Bridge
- Replaced by: New Kömürhan Bridge

Location
- Interactive map of Kömürhan Bridge

The Kömürhan Bridge, also known as the İsmet Paşa Bridge, is a box-girder bridge that carries the Elazığ-Malatya highway D.300 over the Euphrates River in eastern Turkey. It was constructed using the balanced cantilever technique.

The bridge was constructed to replace a 100 m-long (330 ft) concrete arch bridge built by the Swedish company Nydqvist & Holm AB, costs 110 million Turkish lira as the money of that time, and opened on 5 October 1932, which was flooded with the completion of the Karakaya Dam. The new bridge was built by the STFA Group between 23 February 1983 and 8 April 1986.

Kömürhan Bridge is between Malatya Province and Elazığ Province. The tender, that is for building a new bridge that is 600 m length at same place, completed in 2013.

It features in the "50 works in 50 years" list of significant building projects in Turkey published by the Chamber of Civil Engineers in Turkey.
