= List of bridges in Ankara =

This is a list of bridges in the city of Ankara, Turkey.

== Historic bridges ==
İlçe (district)	Name	Image	Era of construction
Yenimahalle	Akköprü		Seljuks
Çankaya	Çankınkapı Bridge		Ottoman Empire
Kalecik	Kalecik Bridge		Ottoman Empire
Bala	Kesikköprü Bridge		?
Sincan	Yenikent Bridge		Ottoman Empire
Altındağ	Soğukkuyu Bridge		Ottoman Empire
Keçiören	Aynalı Bridge		?
Altındağ	Ördekli Bridge		Ottoman Empire
Altındağ	Tabakhane Bridge		Ottoman Empire
Beypazarı	Hacılar Bridge		Ottoman Empire
Beypazarı	Mundarcı Deresi Bridge		Turkish Republic

== Notes ==
- İlter, Fügen (1978). Osmanlılara kadar Anadolu Türk köprüleri. Ankara: Karayolları Genel Müdürlüğü. p. 289.
