= Faculty of Arts and Sciences Building, Istanbul University =

Coordinates: 41°00′35″N 28°57′38″E

The Faculty of Arts and Sciences (FAS) Building of Istanbul University is one of the larger faculty buildings of the university. It is situated in the Laleli neighborhood of Istanbul, Turkey.

The building was constructed between 1942 and 1944. The architects were Sedat Hakkı Eldem (1908-1988) and Emin Halid Onat (1908-1961). The German architect Paul Bonatz (1877-1956) also acted as an adviser during his brief stay in Turkey. It is an example of the second national era in Turkish architecture which can be described as neoclassical. Stone pitching faces, arcades, and colonnades are apparent.

== List of 50 projects ==
Turkish Chamber of Civil Engineers lists Faculty of Arts and Sciences Building as one of the fifty civil engineering feats in Turkey, a list of remarkable engineering projects realized in the first 50 years of the chamber.
