= Battalgazi Bridge =

Battalgazi Bridge Battalgazi Köprüsü
- Coordinates: 38.2711°N 38.3505°E
- Carries: 1 track of the Fevzipaşa-Kurtalan railway
- Crosses: Euphrates
- Locale: Battalgazi, Malatya Province and Baskil, Elazığ Province
- Named for: Battalgazi
- Owner: Turkish State Railways

Characteristics
- Total length: 2,030 m (6,660 ft)
- Height: 60 m (200 ft)

History
- Construction start: 1981
- Construction end: 1986; 40 years ago
- Inaugurated: 16 June 1986
- Replaces: Old Battalgazi Bridge

Location
- Interactive map of Battalgazi Bridge

The Battalgazi Bridge (Turkish: Battalgazi Köprüsü), also known as the Euphrates Railway Bridge (Turkish: Fırat Demiryolu Köprüsü), is a bridge in eastern Turkey. It is a 2,030 m (6,660 ft) long railway bridge spanning the Euphrates river, located about 27 km (17 mi) northeast of Malatya.

The structure was built between 1981 and 1986 by the Turkish State Railways, on the Fevzipaşa-Kurtalan railway, as a replacement for an older bridge, opened in 1935, which was flooded with the construction of the Karakaya Dam. The bridge was the longest bridge in Turkey from 1986 to 2007, when it was surpassed by the Bornova Viaduct in İzmir; and the longest railway bridge until 2008, when surpassed by the Sakarya Viaduct. From 2008, it is the 7th longest bridge in the country and 2nd longest railway bridge.
