= Ankara River =

River in Ankara, Turkey

Coordinates: 39°50′27″N 31°53′15″E

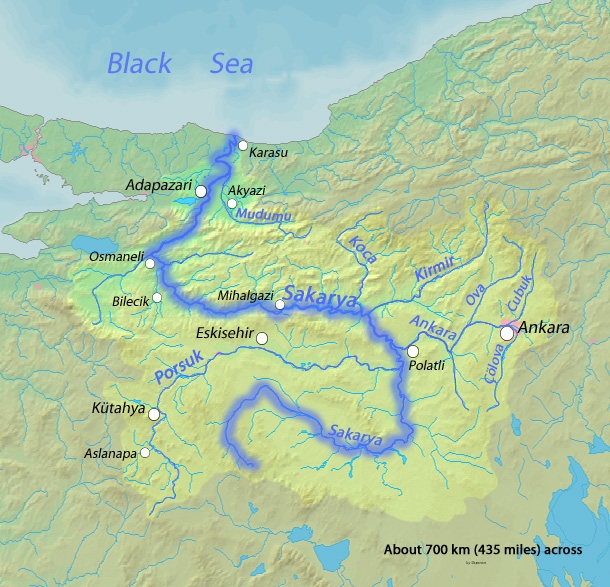
Map of the Sakarya River and its tributaries, with the Ankara River seen at right.

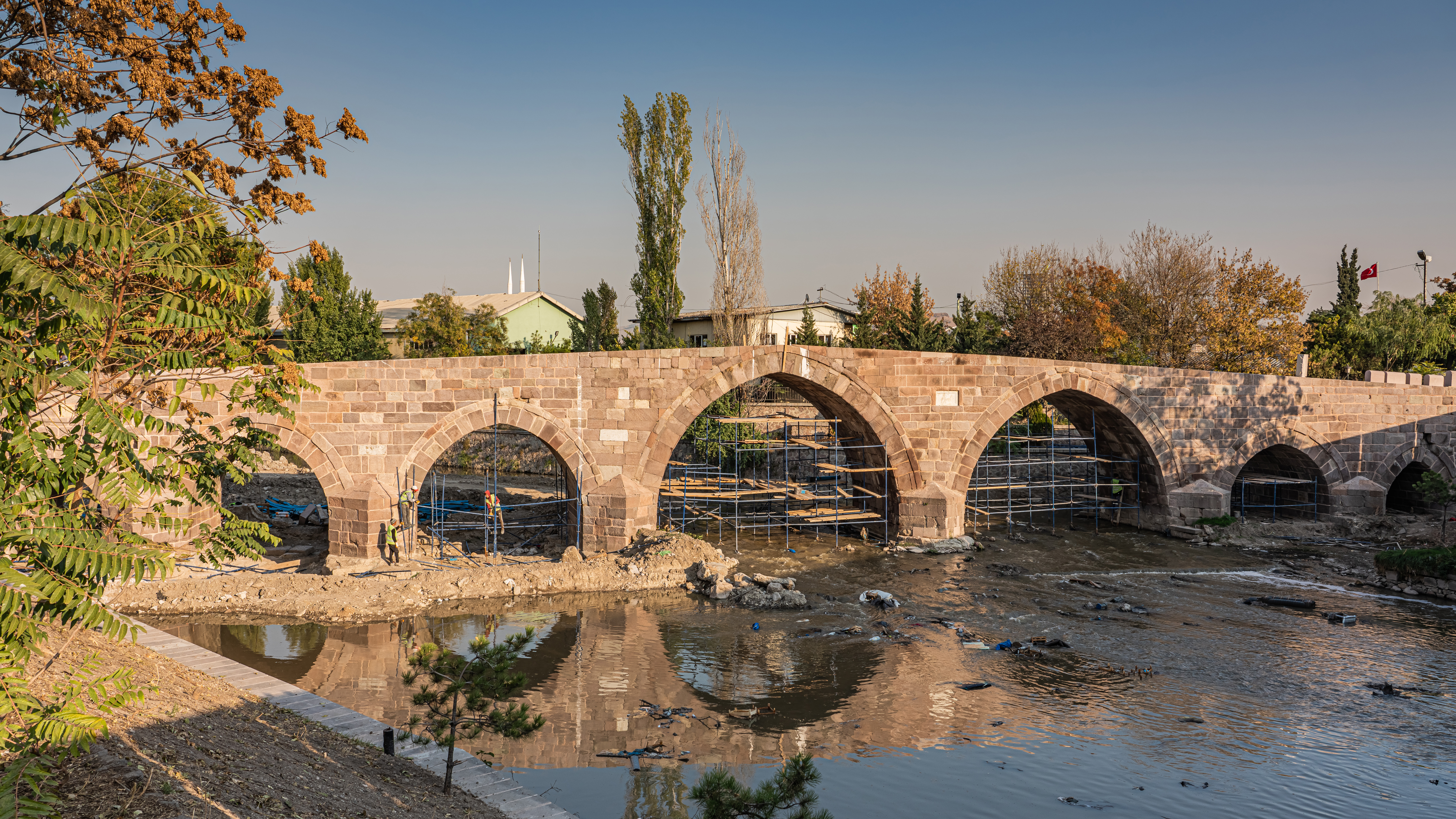
Ankara River and Akköprü at Yenimahalle

Ankara River (Turkish: Ankara Çayı) is a small river (stream) to the west of Ankara, Turkey. It is a tributary of the Sakarya River.

One of its tributaries, the Çubuk Brook, splits Ankara almost in half and crosses through many neighborhoods. There are many bridges built over the Çubuk Brook throughout the city and in some places it is completely covered and encased in a tunnel.

== History ==
Ankara was founded in prehistoric times presumably because of the river. The Hittites settled in Ankara in the 2nd millennium B.C., on the banks of the river. Alexander the Great conquered the city in 334 B.C. and established an important trading center on the river. In 25 B.C., the Roman emperor Augustus incorporated the city into the Roman Empire and made it the capital of the Roman province of Galatia. The city preserved its importance during the Byzantine period. In 1073, Ankara was taken by the Seljuk Turks. Timur fought the Ottoman Sultan Bayezid I near the river at the Battle of Ankara in 1402. During the battle, Timur diverted all the water from one of the river's tributaries, the Çubuk Brook, which left Bayezid I and his army (who were downstream) without water, and won the battle. The Çubuk-1 (1930–1936) and Çubuk-2 (1961–1964) dams were built on the Çubuk Brook.

== Pollution and clean-up efforts ==
Because of its long-time exposure to sewage and industrial pollutants, the river is no longer viable as a fresh water source for irrigation, even though it is still used for irrigation downstream. In response to the foul smell during hot days and the sanitation problems emanating from the river, Ankara Metropolitan Municipality assigned the ASKİ (Ankara Water and Canalization Administration) the task to plan a clean-up project in 2006, which will connect the river with the sewage system. All the water will be directed to the sewage system, the river will be covered completely in certain locations, and the only water left running through the river will be that of any precipitation. The plan will also eliminate the polluted irrigation problem downstream since the river itself will be dried up. The project is scheduled to be completed in 2020.
