= New Kömürhan Bridge =

Bridge in Turkey

New Kömürhan Bridge Yeni Kömürhan Köprüsü
- Coordinates: 38°26′26″N 38°49′08″E
- Carries: Motor vehicle
- Crosses: Euphrates
- Locale: Elazığ – Malatya, Turkey
- Official name: Kömürhan Köprüsü
- Preceded by: Kömürhan Bridge

Characteristics
- Total length: 660 m (2,170 ft)
- Width: 23 m (75 ft)
- Height: 168.5 m (553 ft)
- Longest span: 380 m (1,250 ft)
- No. of spans: 1

History
- Construction start: 2014
- Construction cost: ₺340 million
- Opening: 2 January 2021; 5 years ago

Location
- Interactive map of New Kömürhan Bridge

The New Kömürhan Bridge is a cable-stayed bridge that carries the Elazığ-Malatya highway D.300 over the Karakaya Dam Lake on Euphrates River in eastern Turkey. The bridge is situated between Malatya and Elazığ Provinces.

Construction began in 2014 and the new bridge was officially opened on 2 January 2021. The New Kömürhan Bridge replaced an older box-girder bridge built between 23 February 1983 and 8 April 1986 by the STFA Group.

It is ranked as the world’s 4th longest single-pylon cable-stayed bridge with its 380 m (1,250 ft) centre span.
