= Catalonia (disambiguation) =

Catalonia is part of the Iberian Peninsula in the Mediterranean Sea.

Catalonia also may refer to:

== Places ==
- Principality of Catalonia, former state of southwestern Europe formed by the grouping of the Catalan counties in 1173 and divided between Spain and France in 1659:
  - Autonomous Community of Catalonia, a political unit within Spain, today constituted as the Spanish Autonomous Community of Catalonia
  - Northern Catalonia, a political unit inside France, today constituted as the French département of the Pyrénées-Orientales
- Autonomous Region of Catalonia (1931-1939), a political entity within the Second Spanish Republic
- Catalan Republic, a list of states proclaimed in Catalonia
- Catalan Countries, territories where the Catalan language is spoken
- Old Catalonia

== People ==
- Dorothy Catalonia, a character in Mobile Suit Gundam Wing

== Transportation ==
- HSC Express (1998) or Catalonia, a ferry ship
- SS Catalonia (1881), a passenger cargo ship

== Other uses ==
- Operation Catalonia, Spanish 2010s police action against Catalan independence
- Catalonia Offensive, Nationalist operation against Republicans in the Spanish Civil War
- Catalonia International Trophy, international soccer friendly tournament
- Catalonia (publisher), a Chilean publishing company
- Catalonia Government, autonomous government of Catalonia within Spain

== See also ==
- Wikipedia:WikiProject Catalan-speaking countries
- Catalunya (disambiguation)
- Catalan (disambiguation)
- History of Catalonia
- Northern Catalonia, linguistic region in France
- Hotel Catalonia (disambiguation)
- Spanish ship Cataluña, more than one Spanish Navy ship
