= Catalunya (disambiguation) =

Catalunya is the Catalan name for Catalonia, a part of the Iberian Peninsula in the Mediterranean Sea.

Catalunya also may refer to:

== Places ==
- Principat de Catalunya, former political unit of southwestern Europe formed by the grouping of the Catalan counties in 1162 and divided between Spain and France in 1659:
  - Catalunya, a political unit inside Spain, today constituted as the Spanish Autonomous Community of Catalonia.
  - Catalunya del Nord, a historical region within France, today that closely corresponds with the French département of the Pyrénées-Orientales.
- Plaça de Catalunya, Barcelona, a square in Barcelona
  - Plaça de Catalunya station, a transport hub under the square, including 2 suburban train and 2 subway stations
- Catalunya (DO), a wine region of Spain

== Sports ==
- Copa Catalunya, knockout tournament of Catalan football teams
- Supercopa de Catalunya, association football supercup
- Volta a Catalunya, bicycle touring race
- Rally de Catalunya, WRC rally race
- Circuit de Catalunya, automobile race track
- CN Catalunya, Barcelona aquatics club

== Other uses ==
- Catalunya Ràdio, public radio network in Catalonia

== See also ==
- Catalan (disambiguation)
- Catalonia (disambiguation)
- Hotel Catalonia (disambiguation)
- Spanish ship Cataluña, more than one Spanish Navy ship
- Circuit de Barcelona-Catalunya, race track
