= Lower Seyhan Irrigation Project =

Lower Seyhan Irrıgation Project (Turkish: Aşağı Seyhan Sulama Projesi) is one of the major irrigation projects of Turkey, which is located in the Seyhan River basin.

== Location ==
Seyhan is a 660 km (410 mi)-long river in southern Turkey, which flows into the Mediterranean Sea. The upper reaches of the river is in Taurus Mountains. It flows within the city of Adana. Seyhan Dam is located to the north of the city and the irrigation project is situated to the south.

== The Project ==
The irrigation project comprises four phases. During the first phase between 1957 and 1968, 65,000 ha (160,000 acres) of land was irrigated and 2,200 ha (5,400 acres) of land was protected against floods. In the second phase between 1968 and 1974, land covering 48,600 ha (120,000 acres) was irrigated. The third project phase took place between 1974 and 1985, and dealt mainly with Tarsus area to the west . In this phase, 19,831 ha (49,000 acres) was irrigated and 2,000 ha (4,900 acres) land was protected against floods. The forth phase, which is still under construction deals with the coastal area. The total area of the irrigation project will stretch over 173,638 ha (429,070 acres).

== Turkey's top 50 civil engineering projects ==
Turkish Chamber of Civil Engineers lists the first phase of this Project as one of the fifty civil engineering feats in Turkey, a list of remarkable engineering projects realized in the first 50 years of the chamber.
