= Kadıncık 2 hydroelectric power plant =

Power plant in Mersin Province, Turkey

- Country: Turkey
- Location: Tarsus, Mersin
- Coordinates: 37°01′55″N 34°50′24″E
- Status: Operational
- Commission date: 1974
- Owner: İbrahim Çeçen Holding

Power generation
- Nameplate capacity: 56 MW
- Annual net output: 307 GWh

Kadıncık 2 hydroelectric plant is a privately owned hydroelectric power station located in Mersin Province, Turkey.

== History ==
The plant was put into service in 1974. In 2016, within the privatization program, Kadıncık 2 plant, together with Kadıncık 1 plant, was purchased by İbrahim Çeçen holding for ₺ 864.1 million (where $1 = ₺ 2.887 ).

== Technical characteristics ==
The installed power is 56 MW. The annual energy capacity is 307 GWh, which is equivalent to the energy requirement of 56,742 households. Kadıncık 2 power station is the fourth highest energy producer in Mersin Province.

== See also ==
- Kadıncık 1 hydroelectric power plant
