= Misis Bridge =

Bridge in Adana, Turkey

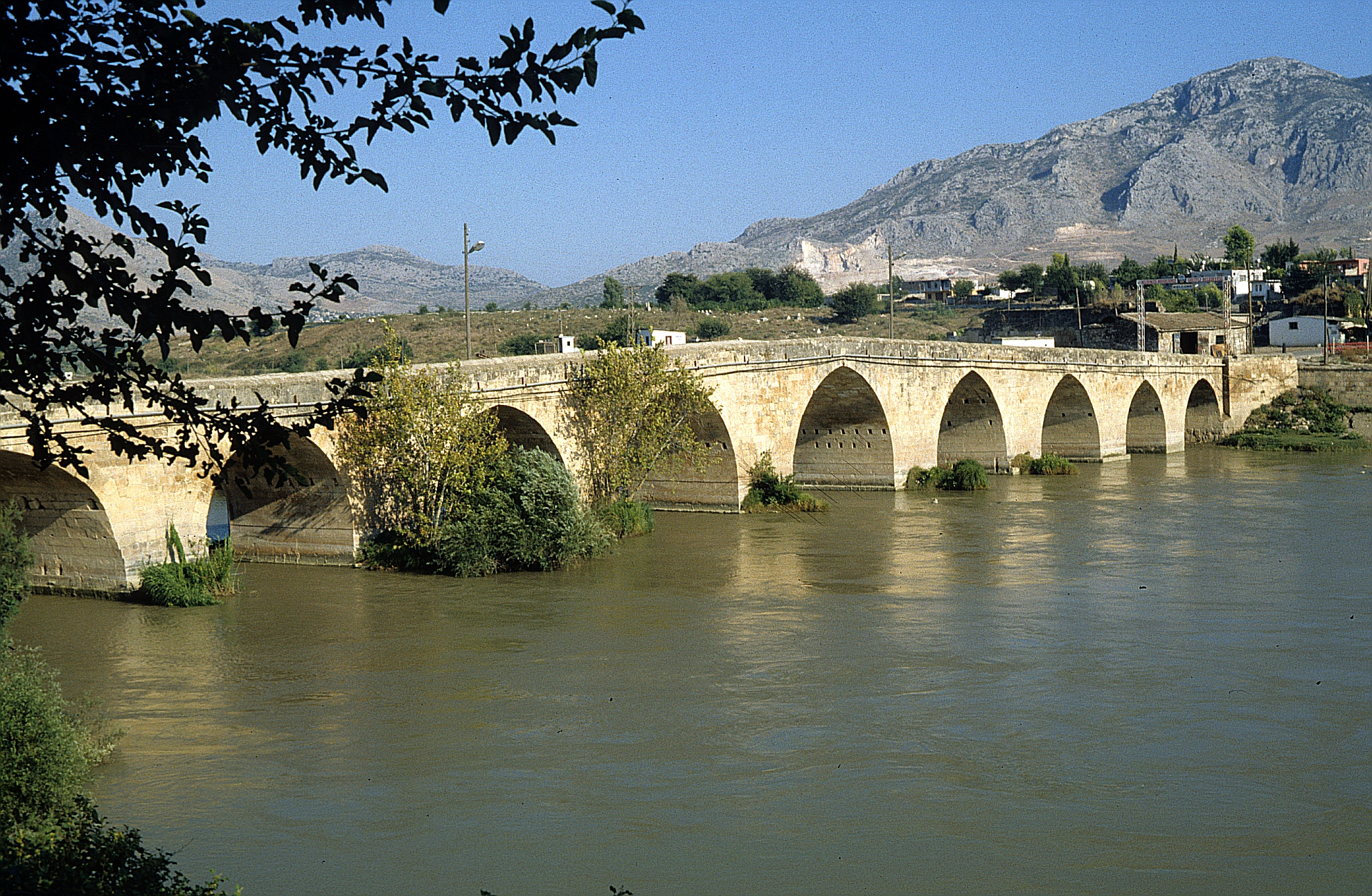
Misis Bridge

Location of the Misis Bridge

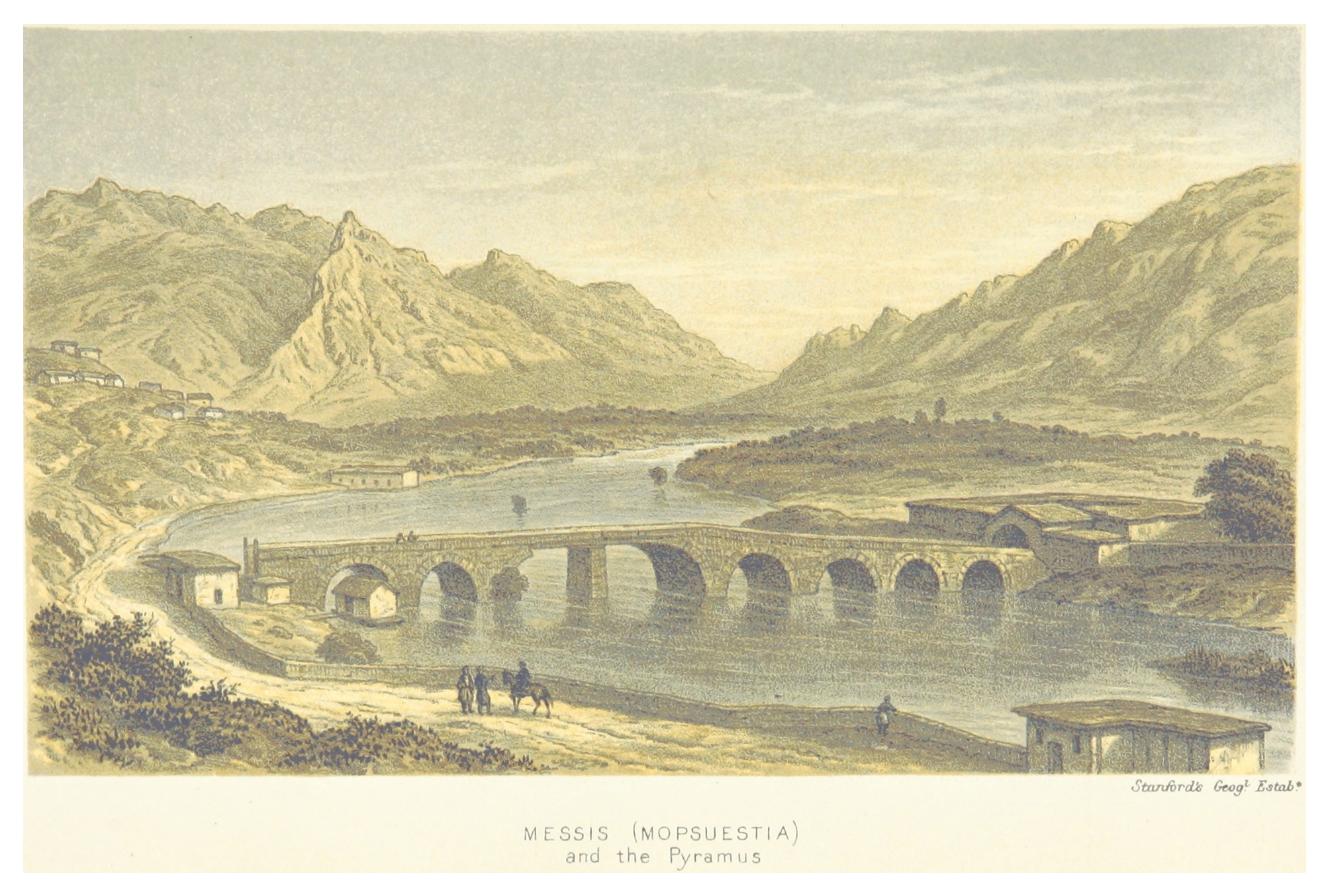
Misis Bridge, c.1870

Misis Bridge is a Roman bridge in Adana Province, Turkey. (Misis is the popular name of Yakapınar town, which is now included in Greater Adana)

== Geography ==
The bridge is over Ceyhan River (Pyramus of antiquity) between the Yakapınar (Mopsuestia of antiquity) and Geçitli at 36°57′N 35°38′E . Presently it is on the road which connects the main highway D.400 to Mediterranean Sea coast. The distance to Adana is 25 kilometres (16 mi).

== History ==
In the Middle Ages, Mopsuestia was a big city and the bridge was built on one of the most active trade roads to east. It was commissioned by the Roman emperor Flavius Julius Constantius (better known as Constantius II) in the fourth century. It was restored by the Byzantine emperor Justinian I in the sixth century. It was again renovated in 743 and 840. The bridge suffered damage in the 1998 Adana–Ceyhan earthquake, but it was restored.

== Details ==
The building material is face stone. There are nine arches. After the last restoration following the earthquake it is still in use.

== Trivia ==
According to a popular legend, Luqman who had discovered the elixir of life dropped the receipt and the herbs from Misis Bridge.

== See also ==
- List of Roman bridges
