= ADM Capital =

Hong Kong credit investment firm

Asia Debt Management Hong Kong Limited
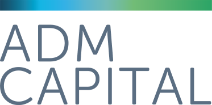
- Type: Private
- Industry: Investment management
- Founded: 1998; 28 years ago
- Founders: Chris Botsford; Denys Firth; Robert Appleby
- Headquarters: Hong Kong
- Key people: Neil Harvey (Chairman)
- Products: Private credit; Distressed debt; Private equity
- AUM: US$1.6 billion (2024)
- Subsidiaries: Cibus
- Website: admcapital.com

ADM Capital (ADM) is an Asian investment management firm headquartered in Hong Kong. The firm focuses on private credit lending but also makes investments related to distressed debt and private equity.

== Background ==
ADM was founded in 1998 by Chris Botsford, Deny Firth and Robert Appleby who came from investment banking backgrounds. After the 1997 Asian financial crisis, the firm's objective was to invest in the region's distressed debt and special situations.

The 1997 Asian financial crisis resulted in $600 billion of distressed debt which was an opportunity for ADM. The firm which described itself cross between a private equity and a distressed debt strategy was to buy debt from existing creditors, then help restructure the company that issued the debt before selling out and reaping annualised rates of return of over 25%. ADM did not hide its predatory nature but stated based on its strict ethics it avoided hostile takeovers and socially or environmentally damaging industries. The Asian Development Bank invested in ADM's funds to help soften the firm's image. At the time the focus of ADM was on Southeast Asia. Investments included India Cements, the Bangkok Mass Transit System and Rizal Commercial Banking Corporation.

In the 2000s, ADM started investing in Chinese non-performing loans.

In 2006, ADM established the ADM Capital Foundation which invested in philanthropic causes in Asia. ADM was approached by M’Lop Tapang, a Cambodian organization working with children, to help secure funding for a permanent day centre. The project lead to the creation of the foundation. In 2012, it had 10 employees and had invested $7 million into projects since establishment.

During the 2008 financial crisis, ADM raised an additional $1 billion for its funds to invest in distressed debt. This was due to the opportunities in the period such as Chinese property and manufacturing companies facing debt repayment difficulties as well as the Australian market in general.

In 2012, it was reported that ADM was moving its focus towards private credit financing due to European banks withdrawing capital from Asia and less distressed debt deals as a result of Asia's economy performing well. ADM launched a lending facility in partnership with International Finance Corporation (IFC) to provide loans to financially stressed mid-sized Asian companies. Such companies could not obtain financing via traditional channels could obtain loans from ADM that were generally short term ranging from $20 million to $50 million each.

ADM later on expanded into Europe and Kazakhstan to carry out private equity activities. Investors of funds focused on those areas included Black Sea Trade and Development Bank, European Bank for Reconstruction and Development and the IFC. In 2014, ADM restructured its Central Eastern Europe and Kazakhstan team in 2014 to provide greater autonomy. In August 2018, ADM spun out its Central Eastern Europe and Kazakhstan business via management buyout to form CCL Capital. ADM did not retain an economic interest in the new firm as it wanted to focus on its existing business activities.

In 2016, ADM launched the Cibus business which focused on investing in Agribusiness companies in the OECD markets via equity and equity-linked debt. The debut Cibus fund raised $452 million to invest in high-growth companies.

In November 2020, it was reported ADM was raising a $500 million debt fund that focused on financing Southeast Asian renewable energy projects. The Asian Infrastructure Investment Bank committed $100 million to it.

In March 2024, ADM stated Chinese companies seeking outbound investments presented private credit lending opportunities since they could not get funding from local banks due to complexities of cross-border transactions. ADM had funded China Minsheng Investment Group's acquisition of Grouse Mountain Resort.

In July 2024, it was reported that Seviora, an asset management unit of Temasek had acquired a minority interest stake of ADM. The purpose was to allow Seviora to offer broader range of middle market private credit products.
