= Çatalan Bridge =

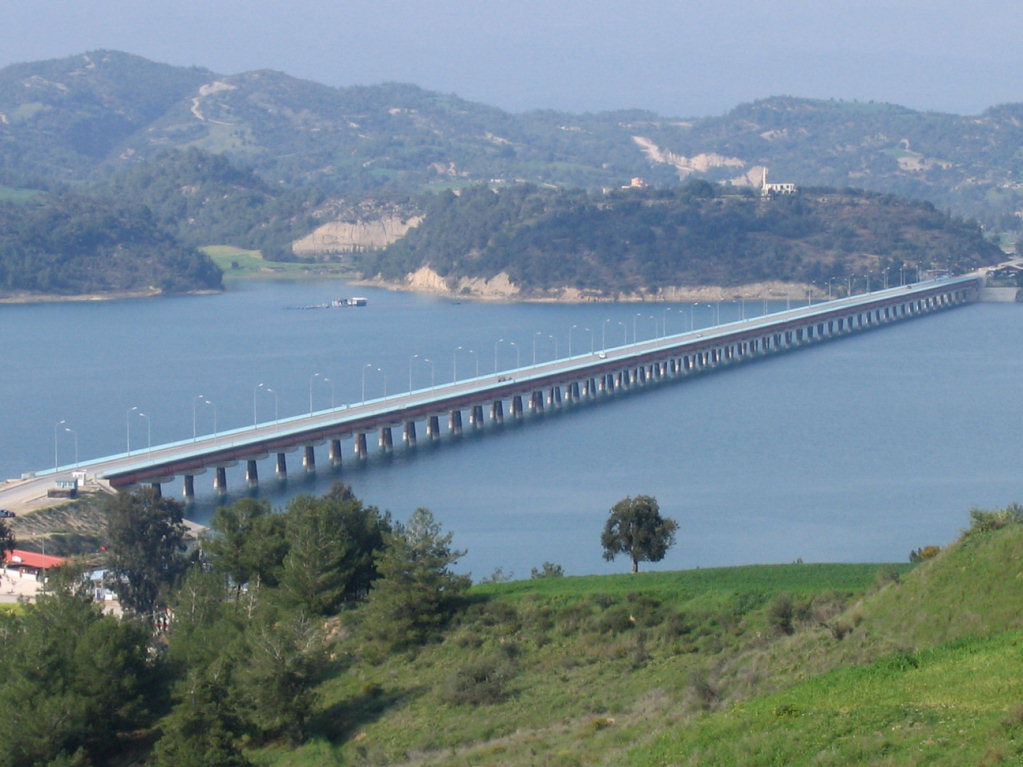
- The Çatalan (West) Bridge crossing Seyhan Dam Lake, seen from the south
- Coordinates: 37.0771°N 35.2742°E
- Carries: 2 lanes of Göl Kenarı Road
- Crosses: Seyhan Dam
- Locale: Adana, Turkey
- Official name: Çatalan Köprüsü
- Maintained by: Karayolları Genel Müdürlüğü

Characteristics
- Material: Reinforced concrete
- Total length: 1575 m

History
- Construction start: 1998
- Construction end: 2002
- Opened: 17 June 2002

Location
- Interactive map of Çatalan Bridge

The Çatalan Bridge (Turkish: Çatalan Köprüsü), also known as the West Bridge (Turkish: Batı Köprüsü), is a 1,575 m (5,167 ft) long bridge crossing the Seyhan Dam Lake in Adana, Turkey. The bridge connects the city of Adana to the villages and vacation homes north of the lake. Despite crossing the Seyhan Dam Lake, the bridge is named after the Çatalan Dam, which is 14 kilometres (8.7 mi) north and the next dam upstream on the Seyhan River. The Çatalan bridge was the longest bridge in Turkey from its construction in 1998 to 2007, when it was surpassed by Viaduct No. 1 near Bolu, and the longest bridge crossing a body of water until 2016, when it was surpassed by the Osman Gazi Bridge near Gebze.

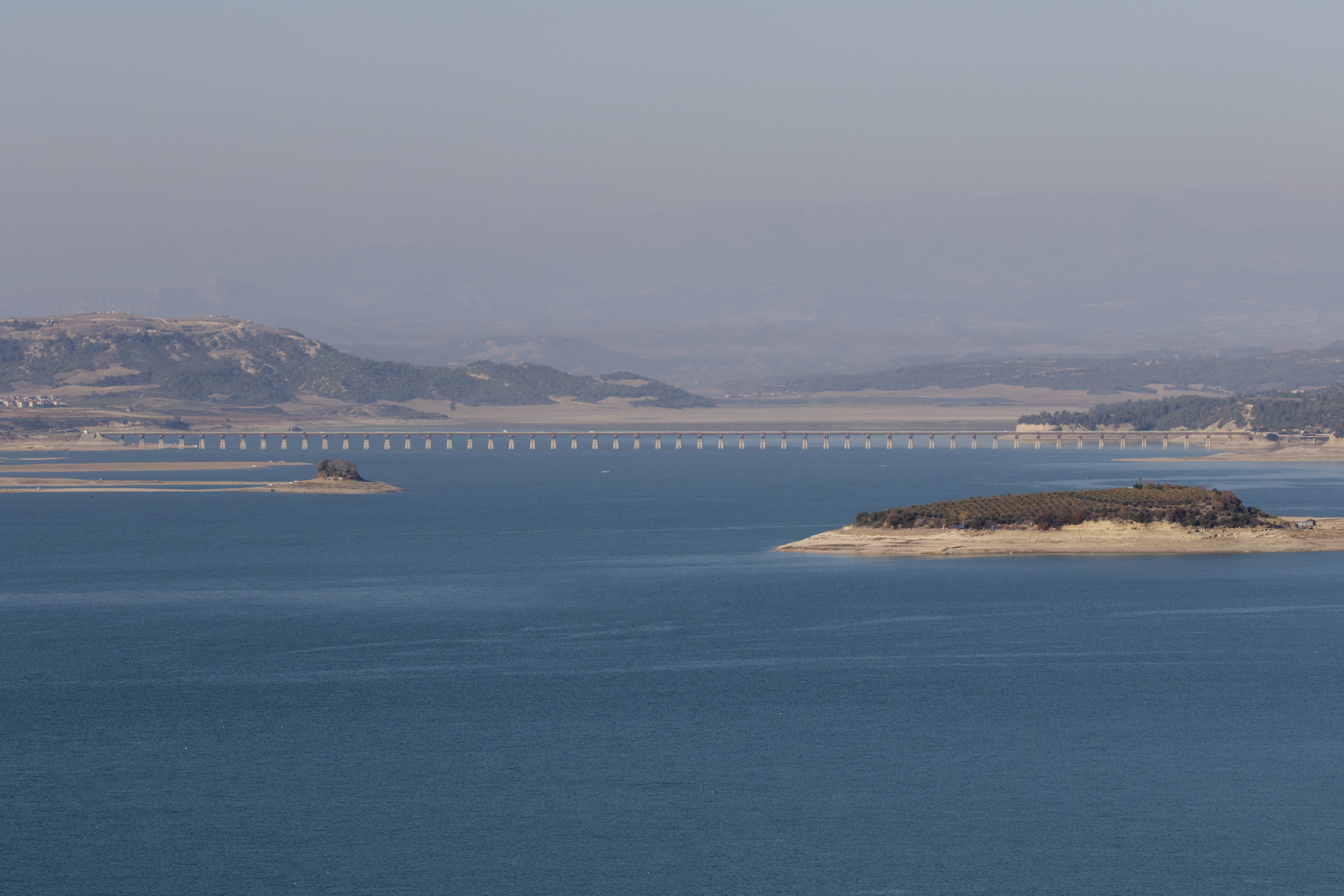
The Çatalan (West) Bridge crossing Seyhan Dam Lake, seen from the campus of Çukurova University.

Construction was started in 1998 by a consortium of three companies: Lurgi Bamag, STFA and ALKE. The bridge opened to traffic on 17 June 2002.
