= Moses Chayyim Catalan =

Italian poet and rabbi

Moses Chayyim Catalan (? in Padua, Italy – 1661 in Padua) was an Italian poet. A son of the physician Abraham Catalan, he was rabbi in his native town, and died there at an advanced age in 1661. It was to him that the first letters of Isaac Vita Cantarini, whose teacher he was, were addressed. His "Metzaref ha-Sekel", a rhetorical pamphlet on man, has never been published. He wrote a poem in honor of the marriage of his sister Perla to Raphael Gans Levi, which can be read either as Hebrew or as Italian. It has been reprinted by Johann Christoph Wolf, Bibliotheca Hebræa iii. 726. In 1645 he wrote a similar poem in honor of Shabbethai Astruc. An elegy on Lamentations in ottava rima was also published by him at Padua.

== Bibliography ==
- Isaac Chayyim Cantarini, Pachad Yitzchaq, 10a
- Marco Osimo, Narrazione, p. 68
- Franz Delitzsch, Zur Geschichte der Jüdischen Poesie, p. 71
- Moritz Steinschneider, Catalogus Librorum Hebræorum in Bibliotheca Bodleiana col. 1785
- Cat. Ghirondi (Sam. Schönblum, Berlin, 1872), p. 2, cod. 4B (where the pamphlet is erroneously ascribed to Abraham Catalan, "rabbi in Padua")
- Moritz Steinschneider, in Monatsschrift, xliii. 420
