= Şekerpınarı Bridge =

Şekerpınarı Bridge Şekerpınarı Köprüsü
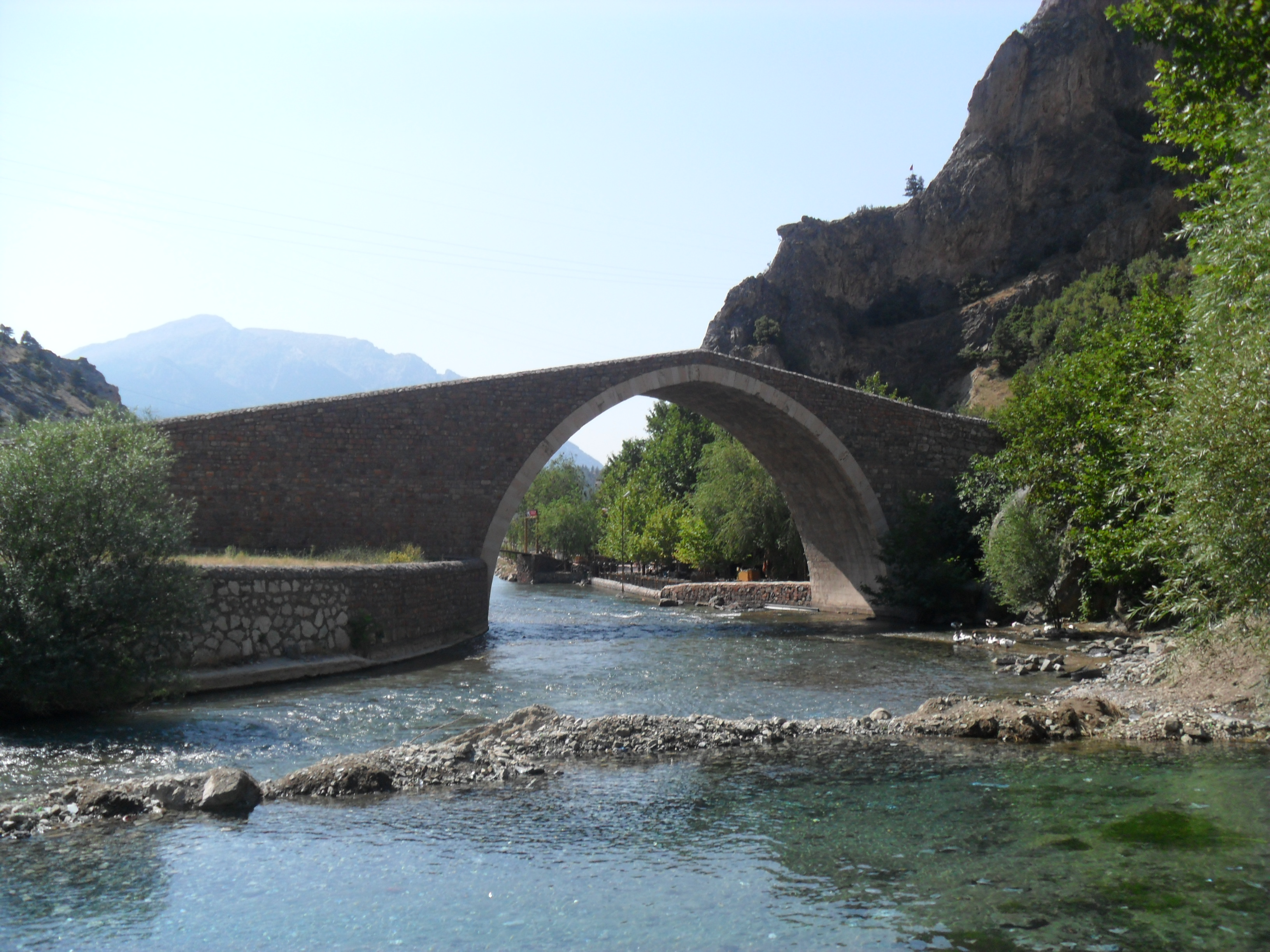
- Şekerpınarı Bridge seen from the north.
- Coordinates: 37.47111°N 34.86194°E
- Crosses: Çakıtsuyu Creek, tributary of Seyhan River
- Locale: Taurus Mountains, Turkey

Characteristics
- Material: Stone
- Total length: 83 m (272 ft)
- Longest span: 10.35 m (34.0 ft)
- No. of spans: 1

Şekerpınarı Bridge (Turkish: Şekerpınarı Köprüsü), also called Akköprü, is a Roman bridge in the Taurus Mountains, southern Turkey.

== Geography ==
The bridge spans over Çakıtsuyu Creek, a tributary of Seyhan River, Sarus of the antiquity, and marks the border line of two districts, Ulukışla of Niğde Province and Pozantı of Adana Province at 37°28′16″N 34°51′43″E. Its distance to Pozantı is 5.5 km (3.4 mi), to Ulukışla is 38 km (24 mi), to Niğde 27 km (17 mi) and to Adana 105 km (65 mi). The bridge carried once a former Turkish state highway. Although still usable, it is now abandoned. The current road course is very close to the bridge. It is between the Turkish state highway D.750 to the east and the Turkish State Railways to the west. Just north of the bridge, there is a spring, which is called Şekerpınarı (literally: "sugar-spring"), and there is a popular picnic area around Şekerpınarı.

== History ==
The bridge was constructed in the late Roman Empire era. It was also used during the Byzantine Empire, the Seljuks of Anatolia, the Karamanids and the Ottoman Empire. In the 14th and 15th centuries, it was the customs post of the Karamanids, who controlled the north of the bridge. It was restored many times, the last one being in 2000–2001.

== Architecture ==
It is a 83 m-long (272 ft) single-arch stone bridge with arch span width of 10.35 m (34.0 ft).

== See also ==
- List of Roman bridges
