= Hotel Catalonia =

Catalonia Hotel or Hotel Catalunya or variation, may refer to:

- Hotel Torre Catalunya, skyscraper and hotel in Barcelona, Spain
- Hotel Catalonia Plaza Europa, skyscraper and hotel in L'Hospitalet de Llobregat (suburb of Barcelona), Spain

== See also ==
- Catalonia (disambiguation)
- Catalunya (disambiguation)
