= Fifty civil engineering feats in Turkey =

List of important civil engineering projects

Fifty civil engineering feats in Turkey or more formally 50 works in 50 years is a list published in 2005 by the Turkish Chamber of Civil Engineers about fifty prestigious projects of the civil engineering in Turkey. The list has five subsections about regional development, general purpose buildings, transportation, hydrology and industrial buildings.

== Formation ==
The Chamber of Civil Engineers department of the Union of Chambers of Turkish Engineers and Architects created the list on the 50th anniversary of the organization to enhance awareness in Turkish society about the achievements in the field of civil engineering. In line with this goal, a jury consisting of ten people from different professions, each in their field of expertise, was formed and the process of compiling, evaluating and selecting 50 works began.

On 31 August 2005, all suggestions were consolidated, a collective recommendation list was prepared and evaluation studies were started by the jury members. During the evaluations, it was adopted in principle that the works to be considered should be divided into sections of the field of expertise within the framework of the general grouping principle and that the works within the scope of all civil engineering specialization branches should be evaluated in this project.

== The list ==
(Turkey) Name of the project	Province	Duration of the Project (Note: In cases of projects with multiple stages, only the first stage is shown)
Railways	(All over Turkey)	1923–1940
Highways	(All over Turkey)	1948–1957
Southeastern Anatolia Project (GAP)	(South East Anatolia)	1977–2010
Ankara Railway Station	Ankara	1935–1937
Mersin Halkevi Building	Mersin	1944–1946
Atatürks's mausoleum	Ankara	1944–1953
Parliament Building	Ankara	1939–1961
Atatürk Cultural Center	Istanbul	1946–1969
Faculty of Arts and Sciences	Istanbul	1943–1952
Middle East Technical University campus	Ankara	1961–1981
Gülhane Training and Research Hospital	Ankara	1962–1971
Ankara 19 Mayıs Stadium	Ankara	1934–1936
Istanbul Abdi İpekçi Arena	Istanbul	1978–1989
Atatürk Olympic Stadium	Istanbul	1998–2001
Kızılay Emek Business Center	Ankara	1959–1965
Istanbul Galleria Shopping center	Istanbul	1987–1988
Istanbul İş Bankası Towers	Istanbul	1996–2000
Ataköy Housing	Istanbul	1960–1984
1992 Erzincan earthquake emergency housing	Erzincan	1992–1993
Sivas-Erzurum Railway	Sivas-Erzurum	1933–1937
75th Anniversary Selatin Tunnel	Izmir- Aydın	1990–2000
Ankara Metro	Ankara	1992–1997
Ankara-Sivrihisar Highway	Ankara-Eskişehir	1995–2006
Kömürhan Bridge	Elazığ-Malatya	1930–1932
Birecik Bridge	Şanlıurfa-Gaziantep	1951–1956
Bosphorus Bridge	Istanbul	1970–1973
İmrahor Viaduct	Ankara	1992–1998
TAG Motorway Viaduct	Gaziantep	1993–1998
Manavgat Bridge	Antalya	1997–1999
Antalya Airport	Antalya	1996–1998
Atatürk Airport	Istanbul	1998–2000
Çubuk Dam	Ankara	1930–1936
Keban Dam and Hydroelectric Plant	Elazığ	1965–1974
Karakaya Dam and Hydroelectric Plant	Diyarbakır	1976–1987
Atatürk Dam and Hydroelectric Plant	Şanlıurfa	1983–1999
Oymapınar Dam and Hydroelectric Plant	Antalya	1977–1984
Lower Seyhan Irrigation Project	Adana	1957–1968
Şanlıurfa Irrigation tunnels	Şanlıurfa	1981–2000
Yenikapı Wastewater Pre-treatment Plant	Istanbul	1985–1988
Hacı Ömer Sabancı OSB Water Intake and Purifying Plant	Adana	1988–1991
Yeşilçay Drinking Water Plant	Istanbul	1997–2003
Mersin Harbor	Mersin	1954–1961
Bartın Harbor	Bartın	1960–1965
Afşin Elbistan Thermic Power Plant	Kahramanmaraş	2000–2006
Trakya Natural Gas Power Plant	Kırklareli	1984–1987
Kemerköy Thermic Plant exhaust gas purifying system	Muğla	1998–2002
Baku-Tiflis-Ceyhan pipeline and Yumurtalık terminal	Adana (filling facility)	2000–2006
İzmit Tüpraş Refinery	Kocaeli	1960–1961
Ereğli Iron and Steel Plant	Zonguldak	1961–1965
Petkim Petrochemical Plant	Izmir	1980–1985
