= STFA Group =

STFA Yatırım Holding A.Ş.
- Type: Private
- Industry: Construction, Energy
- Founded: 1938
- Founders: Sezai Türkeş, Feyzi Akkaya
- Headquarters: Istanbul, Turkey
- Key people: Adnan Nas, Aslan Uzun, Altan Dinç
- Products: Marine & Civil Construction, Energy Distribution, Construction Equipment
- Subsidiaries: STFA Construction Group

STFA Group (Turkish: STFA Grubu) is a Turkish conglomerate, providing services in the construction, energy distribution, construction equipment and construction chemicals industries. STFA was founded in 1938 by contractors Sezai Türkeş and Feyzi Akkaya. STFA has been employed in contracts in 24 countries so far, for a cumulative amount of US$25 billion.

== History ==
Türkeş and Akkaya met while studying civil engineering at Istanbul Technical University. They established STFA İnşaat Müteahhitliği (STFA Construction Contracting) using the initials of their names.

Before the Second World War heavy construction contracts in Turkey were usually won by foreign contractors. Sezai Türkeş and Feyzi Akkaya were the first major local contractors to successfully compete for this business. Türkeş and Akkaya first won contracts for bridge construction and foundation pile driving at Malatya in central Anatolia. During the postwar period, STFA built bridges, ports, dams, tunnels, and high voltage lines throughout Turkey, including the Sivas-Erzurum railway bridges, the ports of Kuşadası, Bartın, and Karadeniz Ereğli, and the Kadıncık Hydroelectric Power Plant.

In addition, STFA was the first Turkish contractor to win contracts beyond Turkey. When the Turkish economy was in recession in the 1970s, STFA went abroad in order not to lay off its personnel and leave its existing machinery assets idle. STFA tendered for the construction of Tripoli port in Libya in 1972 and signed its first international contract at the beginning of 1973.

By the 1990s, however, STFA had turned into a conglomerate of diverse businesses, most of which were losing money. After the retirement of the founders, grandchildren took over. Initially, they disposed of assets to reduce STFA's bank debt. However, they were unable to manage the conglomerate successfully and, in 2001, new professional executive were appointed and STFA was forced to restructure debts totaling $500 million. STFA sold many assets, including shipyards, land, and a ski resort during the crisis, and closed money-losing assets that could not be sold. It kept only the construction contracting and equipment distribution businesses, plus its energy utilities. STFA took until 2007 to resolve all of its debts and, as part of its restructuring, sold a minority interest to ADM Capital, a Hong Kong–based fund manager.

== Business Units ==
=== Construction Group ===
The STFA Construction Group alone has revenues of US$700 million per annum. It undertakes large-scale construction contracting throughout the Middle East and North Africa. Since Libya, its international operations to date include projects in Saudi Arabia (1978), Egypt (1981), Iran (1983), Tunisia (1984), Pakistan (1992), and Oman and Qatar (2000).

STFA Construction Group's completed projects include marine works such as container terminals, commercial and naval harbours, water intake and outfalls, and LNG terminals, as well as bridges, dams, highways, tunnels, railways, hydraulic structures, water and wastewater transmission, residential buildings and overhead electric transmission lines, foundation works, project management and engineering consultancy.

In the 1980s and 1990s STFA Group worked on many of Turkey's largest civil engineering projects, such as the Second Bosphorus Bridge and Istanbul ring roads, the Orhaneli Thermal Power Plant, the Golden Horn tunnels, and the construction of the Galata Bridge.

STFA has evolved, with independent business units today specialising in constructing marine structures, highways, bridges, tunnels, oil-gas-power plants, power transmission lines, deep foundations, residential-commercial-industrial buildings, water and sewage treatment plants, urban infrastructure, engineering and construction management services.

=== Construction Equipment ===
SIF Construction Equipment Marketing Ltd, a subsidiary of STFA, is the largest construction equipment dealer in Turkey and the sole dealer for JCB for Turkey since 1974. SIF has sales offices and service stations in major cities of Turkey.

=== Energy Distribution ===
STFA is a shareholder in Enerya Gas, Electricity and Water Distribution Company, which operates eleven gas distribution concessions with the purpose of building, operating, and transferring citywide gas distribution networks in twelve cities in Turkey. The concessions, all of which are green field projects, extend over a period of 30 years.

== Group companies ==
- Construction Group
  - STFA Construction Company
  - STFA Infrastructure & Tunnel Construction Contracting Ind. & Trade Co.
  - STFA Technological Installations Inc.
  - STFA Energy Telecommunication Industry and Trade Company
  - STFA Temel Pile Construction Company
  - STFA Temel Investigation and Drilling Company
  - STFA Marine Construction Company
  - STFA Surveying Company
  - ECAP Engineering and Consultancy Co.
  - Al HABTOOR – STFA Soil Group L.L.C. (UAE)
  - RIO – STFA Construction Co. (KSA)
  - STFA India Infrastructure Private Ltd. (INDIA)
  - Saudi STFA Company (KSA)
- Construction Equipment
  - SİF JCB İş Makinaları
- Natural Gas Distribution
  - Enerya Gas, Electricity and Water Distribution
- Institutional Forklift Rentals
  - Universal Handlers

== See also ==
- List of companies of Turkey
- Turkish construction and contracting industry
