= Çubuk-1 Dam =

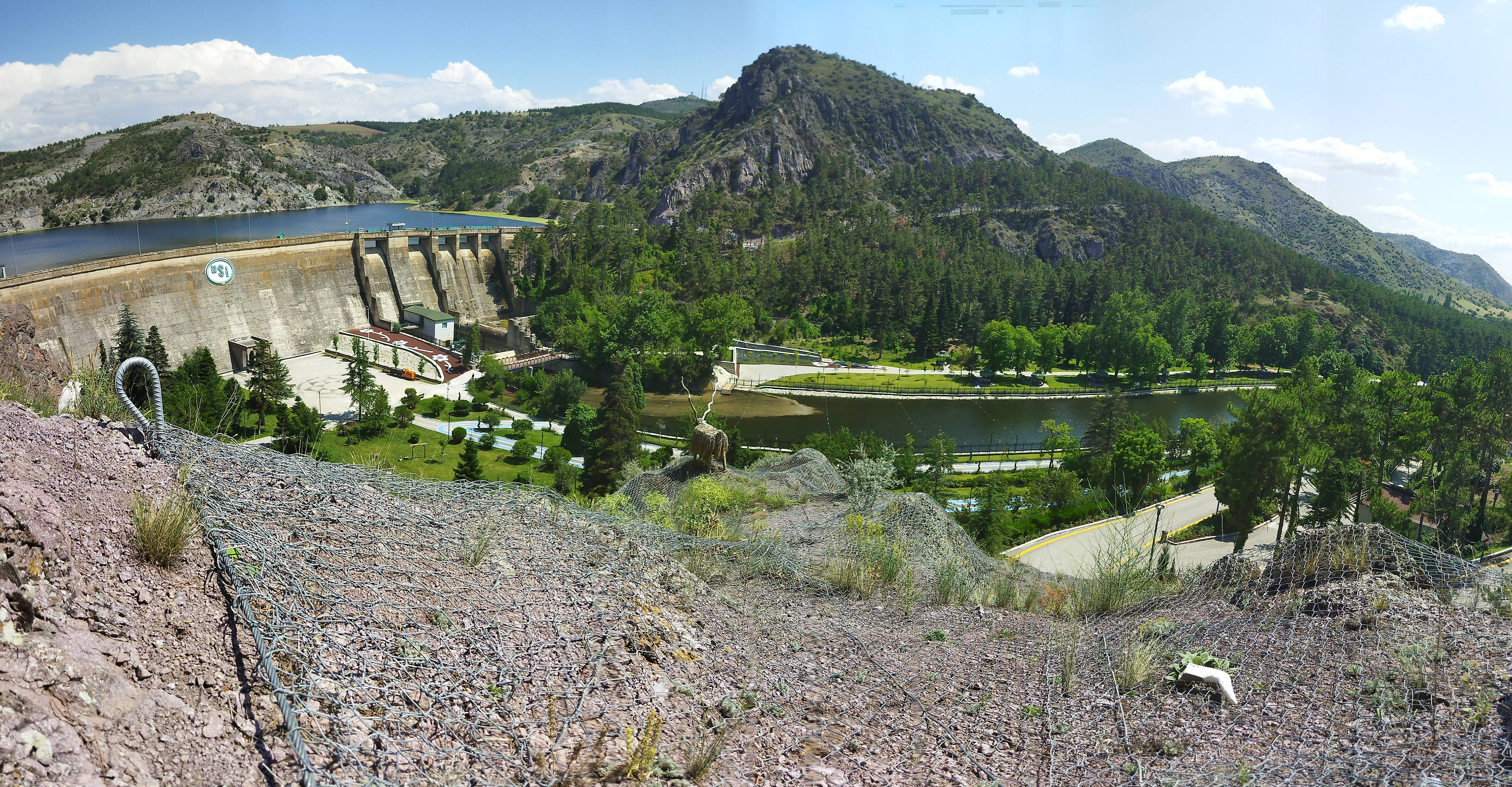

- Location within Turkey
- Location: Çubuk, Ankara Province, Turkey
- Coordinates: 40°00′12″N 32°55′49″E
- Construction began: May 1930
- Opening date: April 1936
- Construction cost: £2.32 million TRY
- Operator: Turkish State Hydraulic Works

Dam and spillways
- Type of dam: Concrete gravity
- Impounds: Çubuk River
- Height: 25 m (82 ft)
- Dam volume: 120,000 m^{3} (4,200,000 ft^{3})

Reservoir
- Creates: Çubuk Reservoir
- Total capacity: 1,200 m^{3} (42,000 ft^{3})
- Surface area: 1 km^{2} (0.39 mi^{2})

The Çubuk-1 Dam is a concrete gravity dam on the Çubuk Stream near Çubuk in Ankara Province, Turkey. It is located 12 km north of the center of Ankara and was built to control floods and provide drinking water to the city. Its construction lasted from 1930 to 1936; Mustafa Kemal Atatürk attended its inauguration on November 3, 1936. It was the first concrete dam constructed in Turkey and the first constructed in Ankara, and is recognized by Turkey's Chamber of Civil Engineers as one of the country's top 50 engineering feats. It is owned and maintained by the Turkish State Hydraulic Works and was constructed at a cost of 2.32 million TRY.

The dam is 25 m (82 ft) tall, 900 m (3,000 ft) long and made of 120,000 m^{3} (4,200,000 ft^{3}) of concrete. The aggregate for the concrete was derived from volcanic rock in nearby areas. It has a circular axis of 200 m (660 ft) and its arch-like design was used for stability. Hardly used, its reservoir has a normal volume of 1,200 m^{3} (42,000 ft^{3}) and surface area of 1 km^{2} (0.39 mi^{2}). The dam's reservoir used to be a popular recreational area. Silt accumulation in the reservoir along with raw sewage being dumped upstream halted water supply from the dam in 1994. Since then, efforts have been ongoing to remove the polluted silt from the former reservoir bed. The area behind the dam will also be restored into a park once complete. Before being mostly emptied, the reservoir's elevations above sea level were 906.25 m (2,973.3 ft) at full capacity, 900 m (3,000 ft) at two-thirds capacity and 895 m (2,936 ft) at half.

== See also ==
- Çubuk-2 Dam
- List of dams and reservoirs in Turkey
