= Baskil =

- Municipality
- Location within Turkey
- Coordinates: 38°34′11″N 38°49′23″E
- Country: Turkey
- Province: Elazığ
- District: Baskil

Government
  - Mayor: İhsan Akmurat (AKP)
- Population (2021): 4,826
- Time zone: UTC+3 (TRT)
- Postal code: 23800
- Climate: Csa
- Website: www.baskil.bel.tr

Baskil (Kurdish: Baskîl) is a town of Elazığ Province of Turkey. It is the seat of Baskil District. Its population is 4,826 (2021).

In the 2019 local elections, AKP mayor İhsan Akmurat narrowly won reelection, beating the MHP candidate Tuncer Turus by 49.77% to 48.57%.

== Climate ==
Baskil has a dry-summer humid continental climate (Köppen: Dsa), with hot, dry summers and cold, snowy winters.

Climate data for Baskil (1991–2020)
| Month | Jan | Feb | Mar | Apr | May | Jun | Jul | Aug | Sep | Oct | Nov | Dec | Year |
|---|---|---|---|---|---|---|---|---|---|---|---|---|---|
| Mean daily maximum °C (°F) | 2.9 (37.2) | 4.9 (40.8) | 10.6 (51.1) | 16.4 (61.5) | 21.9 (71.4) | 28.1 (82.6) | 32.6 (90.7) | 32.7 (90.9) | 27.7 (81.9) | 20.4 (68.7) | 11.3 (52.3) | 4.6 (40.3) | 17.9 (64.2) |
| Daily mean °C (°F) | −1.2 (29.8) | 0.3 (32.5) | 5.4 (41.7) | 10.8 (51.4) | 15.7 (60.3) | 21.2 (70.2) | 25.4 (77.7) | 25.4 (77.7) | 20.7 (69.3) | 14.3 (57.7) | 6.4 (43.5) | 0.9 (33.6) | 12.2 (54.0) |
| Mean daily minimum °C (°F) | −4.6 (23.7) | −3.7 (25.3) | 0.6 (33.1) | 5.4 (41.7) | 9.4 (48.9) | 13.6 (56.5) | 17.4 (63.3) | 17.6 (63.7) | 13.4 (56.1) | 8.7 (47.7) | 2.0 (35.6) | −2.4 (27.7) | 6.5 (43.7) |
| Average precipitation mm (inches) | 38.1 (1.50) | 46.55 (1.83) | 44.32 (1.74) | 63.06 (2.48) | 56.76 (2.23) | 12.29 (0.48) | 2.72 (0.11) | 2.26 (0.09) | 8.36 (0.33) | 34.69 (1.37) | 41.94 (1.65) | 44.24 (1.74) | 395.29 (15.56) |
| Average precipitation days (≥ 1.0 mm) | 6.6 | 7.6 | 7.5 | 8.4 | 8.1 | 2.7 | 1.5 | 1.6 | 2.5 | 4.9 | 5.7 | 7.2 | 64.3 |
Source: NOAA
