= Yalnızgöz Bridge =

Yalnızgöz Bridge Yalnızgöz Köprüsü
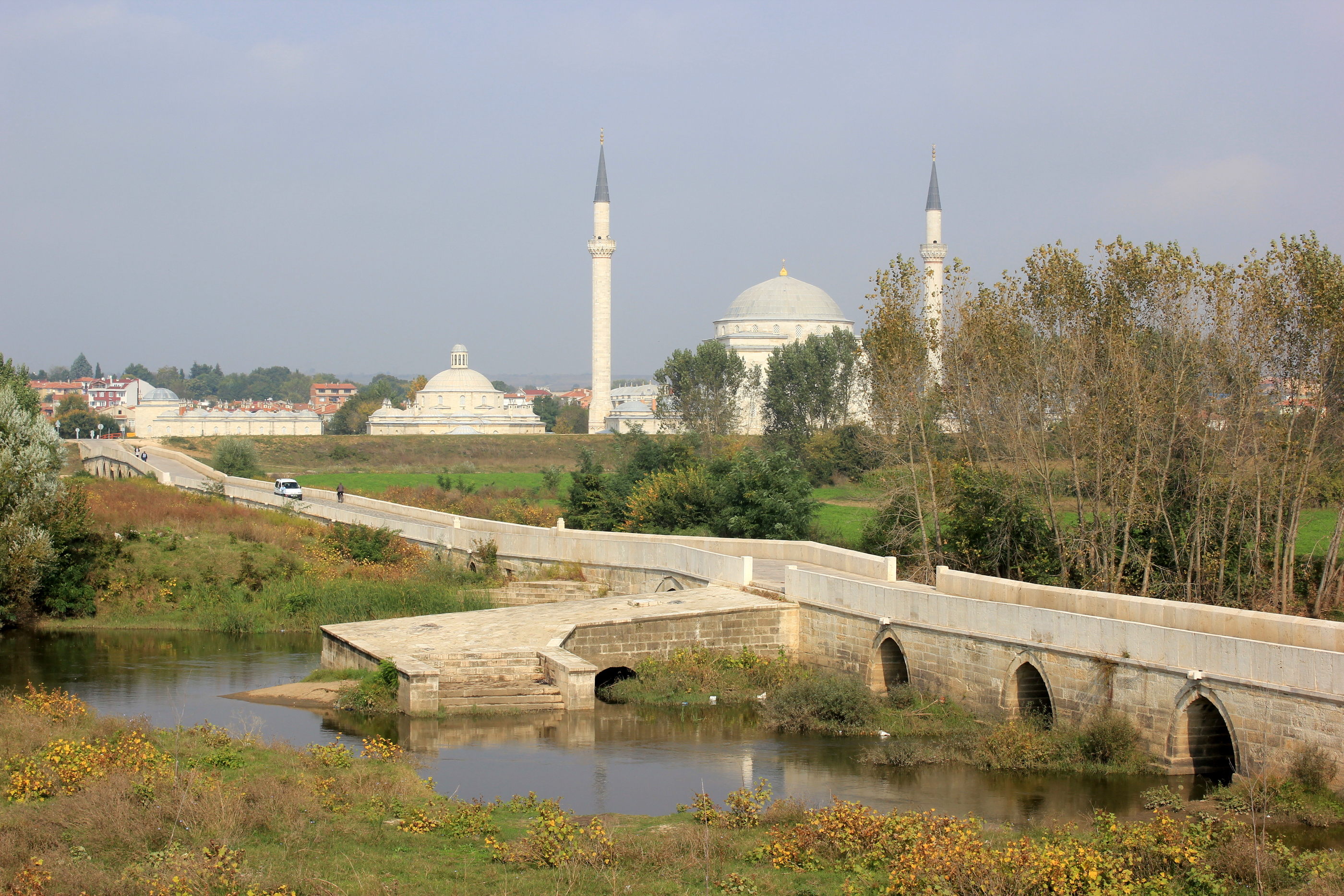
- Yalnızgöz Bridge over the Tunca in Edirne.
- Coordinates: 41.68276°N 26.54665°E
- Crosses: Meriç
- Locale: Edirne, Turkey

Characteristics
- Material: Stone
- No. of spans: 1

Location
- Interactive map of Yalnızgöz Bridge

Yalnızgöz Bridge (Turkish: Yalnızgöz Köprüsü) is a historic Ottoman bridge in Edirne, Turkey. It crosses the Tunca.

== Overview ==
The bridge is a single span constructed during the reign of the Ottoman sultan Selim II (r. 1566-1574). Yalnızgöz means "lone arch". It connects together with Bayezid II Bridge the Complex of Sultan Bayezid II with the city.
