= Gazi Mihal Bridge =

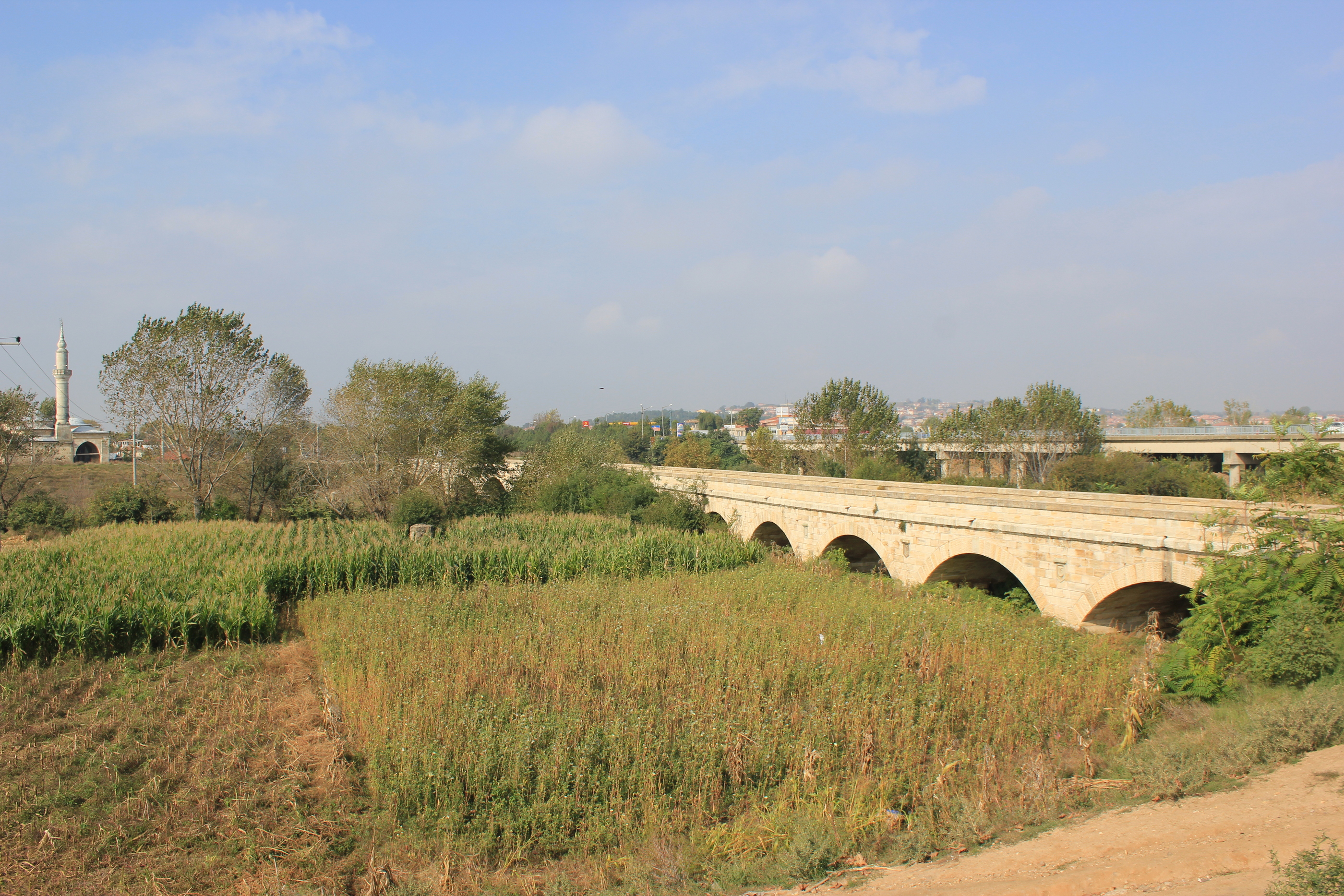
Gazi Mihal Bridge over the Tunca in Edirne.

Gazi Mihal Bridge (Turkish: Gazi Mihal Köprüsü) is a historic Ottoman bridge in Edirne, Turkey. it crosses the Tunca.

The bridge was originally built by the Byzantine emperor Michael VIII (1259-1282) but was rebuilt early in the 15th century by the Ottoman frontier lord Gazi Mihal. In 1544, Ottoman sultan Suleiman the Magnificent (r. 1520-1566) added eight arches at its western end, which had originally eight arches. Sultan Mehmed III (r. 1595-1603) added a span with two arches, which is called the middle bridge.
