= Kadıncık 1 hydroelectric power plant =

Power plant in Mersin Province, Turkey

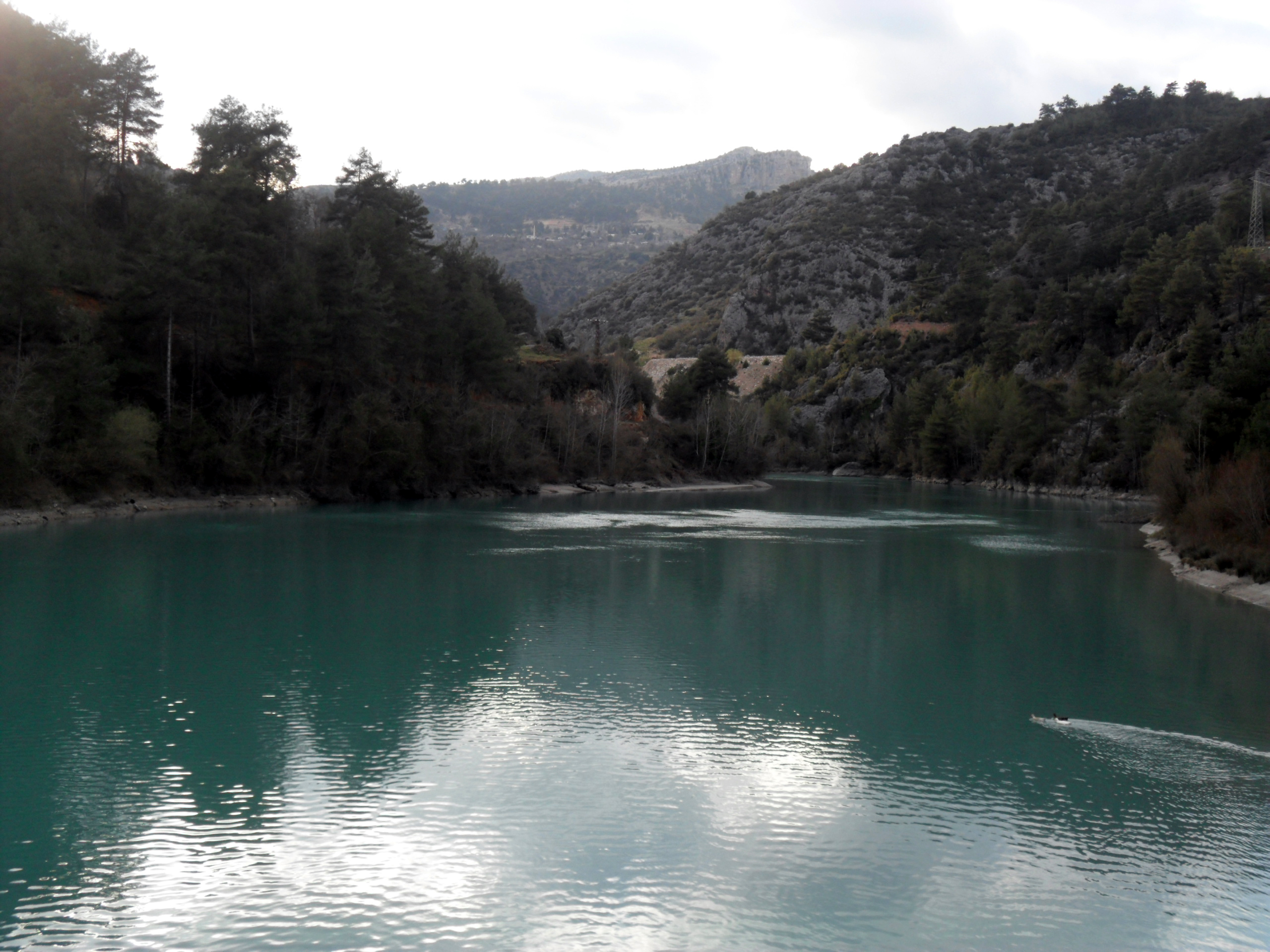
- Dam resorvoir
- Country: Turkey
- Location: Çamlıyayla; Mersin Province
- Coordinates: 37°05′12″N 34°47′23″E
- Status: Operational
- Commission date: 1971
- Owner: İbrahim Çeçen Holding

Power generation
- Nameplate capacity: 2 x 35 MW
- Annual net output: 315 GWh

External links
- Commons: Related media on Commons

Kadıncık 1 hydroelectric plant (Turkish: Kadıncık 1 Hidroelektrik Santrali or shortly Kadıncık 1 HES), is a privately owned hydroelectric power station located in Mersin Province, Turkey.

== Geography ==
The plant is in the southern slopes of the Toros Mountains and on Kadıncık River, a tributary of Berdan River. The nearest village is Meşelik. Administratively, Kadıncık 1 is in Çamlıyayla ilçe (district) of Mersin Province at 37°05′12″N 34°47′23″E. Its distance to Tarsus is 28 kilometres (17 mi) and to Mersin is 58 kilometres (36 mi). The average altitude of the reservoir is about 409 metres (1,342 ft) .

== History ==
The plant was put into service in 1971. In 2016, within the privatization program Kadıncık 1 plant together with Kadıncık 2 plant was purchased by İbrahim Çeçen Holding for ₺ 864.1 million (where $1 = 2.887 TL) in 2016.

== Technical characteristics ==
The installed power is 2 x 35 MW. The annual energy capacity is 315 GWh. If this energy is used solely in homes; it is equivalent to the average consumption of 74,977 households. Kadıncık is the third highest energy producer in Mersin Province.

== See also ==
- Kadıncık 2 hydroelectric power plant
