= Akköprü =

Bridge in Turkey

Coordinates: 39°57′14.0″N 32°49′56.6″E

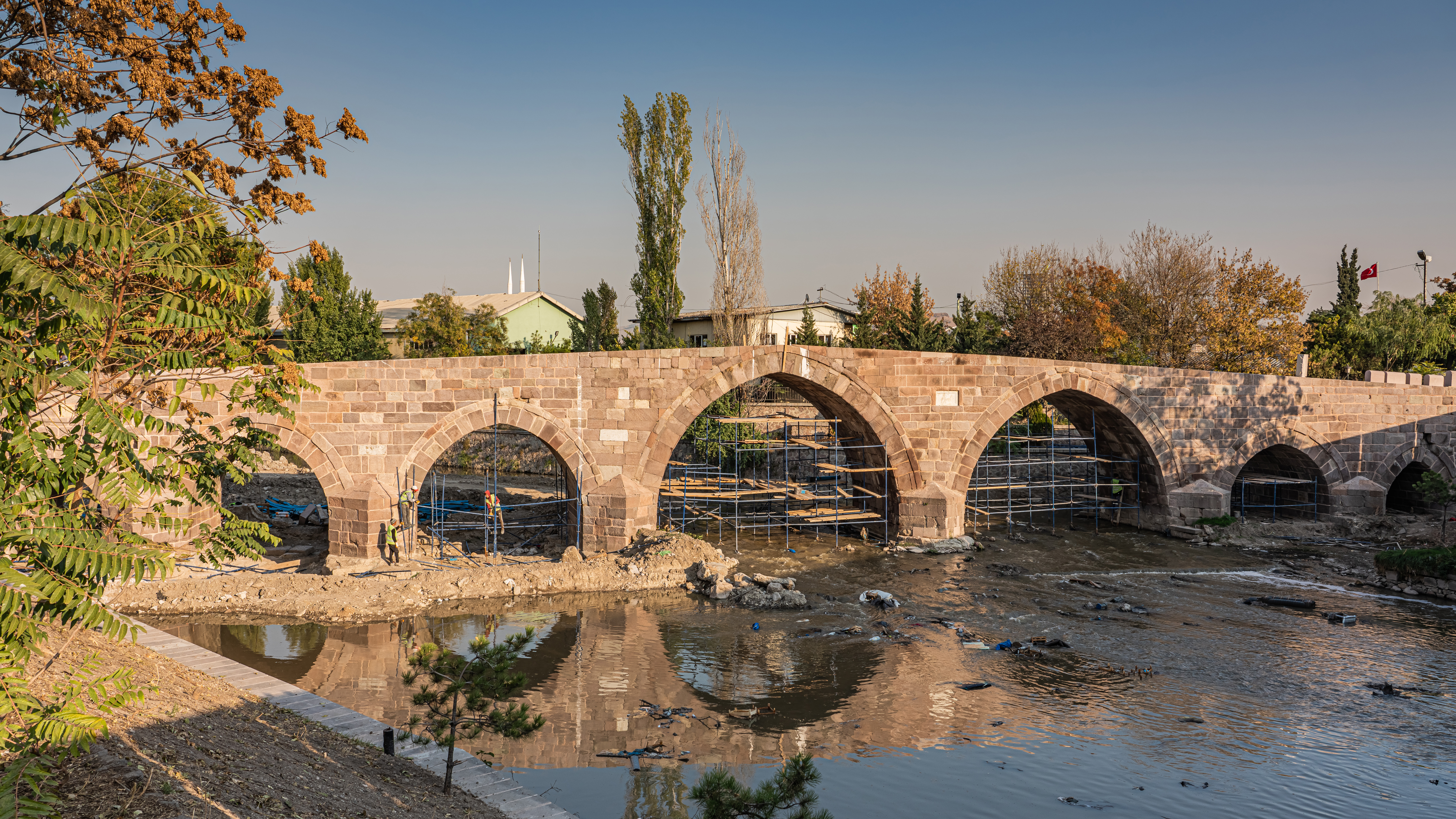
The bridge.

Akköprü (Turkish: ak köprü, "white bridge", Ottoman Turkish: اق کوپری) is a historical bridge in Yenimahalle district of Ankara, Turkey, crosses the Ankara River in front of Varlık neighbourhood. It is the oldest bridge in Ankara and still in good condition. The neighbourhood around the bridge was also named 'Akköprü'. The area is home to the great Atatürk Cultural Centre and Ankamall shopping centre, the biggest mall in Ankara.

== History ==
The bridge was constructed during the reign of the Seljuk sultan Alaaddin Kayqubad I in the early 13th century. It was commissioned by Kızıl Bey, the Seljuk governor of Ankara, in 1222. The bridge was located on the old trade route to Baghdad.

== Structure ==
The main construction material used in the construction of the bridge is basalt stone. The bridge has seven arches, four of them being bigger and the others smaller. The metallic parapets were attached subsequently. There are two inscriptions in the western side of the bridge, one of them being rubbed out.
