= Meriç Bridge =

Meriç Bridge Meriç Köprüsü
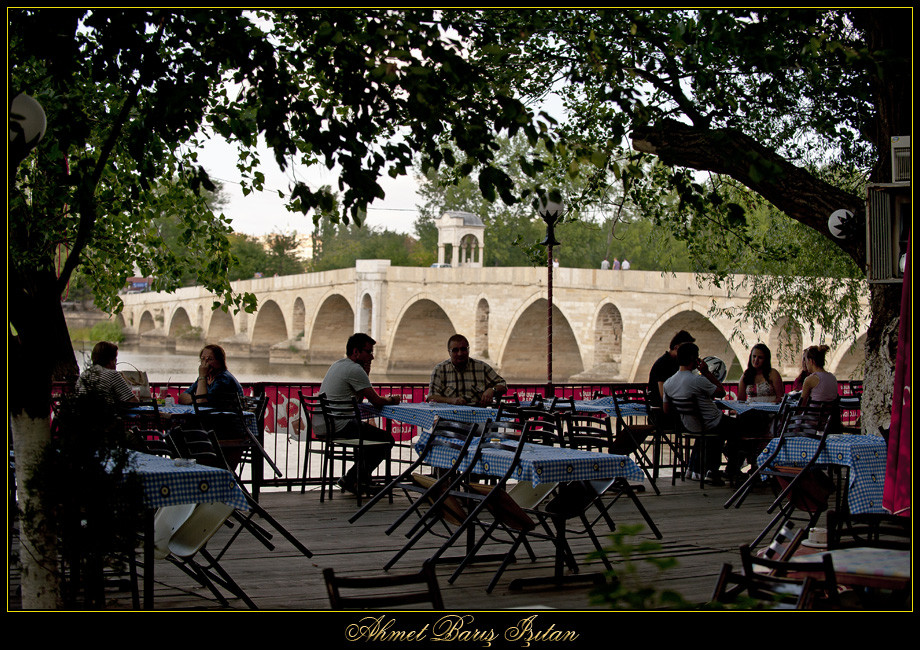
- Meriç Bridge over the Meriç in Edirne.
- Coordinates: 41.66326°N 26.55210°E
- Crosses: Meriç
- Locale: Edirne, Turkey
- Other name(s): Yeni Köprü (New Bridge); Mecidiye Köprüsü (Mecidiye Bridge)

Characteristics
- Material: Stone
- Total length: 263 m (863 ft)
- Width: 7 m (23 ft)
- No. of spans: 12

History
- Construction end: 1843

Location
- Interactive map of Meriç Bridge

Meriç Bridge (Turkish: Meriç Köprüsü), a.k.a. Yeni Köprü, meaning New Bridge or Mecidiye Bridge, after Sultan Abdülmecid I, is a historic Ottoman bridge in Edirne (formerly Adrianople), Turkey. It crosses the Meriç river, formerly carrying the state road D.100, connecting Pazarkule border gate through Karaağaç to Edirne. It has since been bypassed by Dr. Mehmet Müezzinoğlu Bridge.

Construction of the bridge began under the Ottoman sultan Mahmud II (r. 1808–1839), and was completed in 1843 by his successor Abdülmecid I (r. 1839–1861). The 263-metre-long (863 ft) and 7-metre-wide (23 ft) bridge has twelve arches.
