= Spanish ship Cataluña =

Various Spanish Navy ships

Two ships of the Spanish Navy have borne the name Cataluña, after Catalonia:

- Cataluña, a Princesa de Asturias-class armored cruiser in commission from 1908 to 1928.
- Cataluña, a Baleares-class frigate in commission from 1975 to 2004.
