= Esad =

Esad or Essad is a given name. Notable people with the name include:

- Esad Bejic (born 2001), Austrian football centre-back
- Esad Čolaković (1970–2016), Macedonian football defender of Bosniak descent
- Esad Dauti (1937–2020), Kosovar educationalist, member of parliament, environmentalist and entomologist
- Esad Drpljanin (born 2001), Macedonian handball left wing
- Esad Dugalić (1947–2011), Bosnian football goalkeeper
- Esad Džudžo (born 1958), Serbian politician
- Esad Erbili (1847–1931), sheikh of the Naqshi-Khalidi Sufi order
- Esad Hasanović (born 1985), Serbian cyclist
- Esad Hećimović (1963–2017), Bosnian investigative journalist and political analyst
- Esad of Ioannina (died c. 1730), Ottoman Greek polymath
- Esad Landžo (born 1973), Bosnian camp guard and convicted war criminal
- Esad Karišik, Serbian football manager and player
- Esad Komić (1944–2022), Yugoslav football goalkeeper
- Esad Kuhinja (born 1963), Bosnian football defender
- Esad Kulović (1854–1917), Bosnian Muslim politician who served as mayor of Sarajevo
- Esad Kurtović (born 1965), Bosnian medievalist and professor
- Esad Mekuli (1916 1993), Albanian Yugoslav poet, critic and translator
- Esad Plavi (born 1965), Bosnian pop-folk singer
- Esad Razić (born 1982), Bosnian-born Swedish football midfielder
- Esad Ribić (born 1972), Croatian comic book artist and animator
- Esad Sejdic, Yugoslav football forward
- Essad Toptani (1863–1920), Albanian politician who served as prime minister
- Esad Veledar (born 1984), German football midfielder

== See also ==
- Esat (name)
