= Esat (name) =

Esat is a Turkish and Albanian masculine given name, the localised spelling of the Arabic name Asad. Notable people with the name include:

- Esat Bicurri, Albanian-Kosovar pop singer
- Esat Duraku (1936–2021), Albanian chess player
- Esat Mala (born 1998), Albanian footballer
- Esat Oktay Yıldıran (1949–1988), Turkish Army officer
- Esat Sagay (1874–1938), Turkish soldier and politician
- Esat Stavileci (1942–2015), Kosovan lawyer and professor
- Esat Teliti (born 1950), Albanian filmmaker
- Esat Uras (1882–1957), perpetrator and denier of the Armenian Genocide
- Esat Valla (born 1944), Albanian Kosovar painter

== See also ==
- Esad, given name
