= List of indoor arenas in North Macedonia =

The following is a list of indoor arenas in North Macedonia, ordered by final capacity, after construction for seating-only events. There is more capacity if standing room is included (e.g. for concerts).

== Current arenas ==
Image	Stadium	Capacity	City	Team	Inaugurated
	Boris Trajkovski Sports Center	6,250	Skopje	RK Metalurg Skopje	2008
	Jane Sandanski Arena	6,000	Skopje	KK MZT Skopje; RK Vardar	2014
	Sports Hall Kumanovo	4,000	Kumanovo	KK Kumanovo; RK Kumanovo	1980
	Boro Čurlevski Hall	3,850	Bitola	KK Pelister; RK Pelister	1975
	Biljanini Izvori Sports Hall	3,500	Ohrid	KK AV Ohrid, GRK Ohrid	1998
	25 Maj Sports Hall	3,700	Veles	RK Borec	1981
	Gradski Park Hall	1,500	Skopje	KK Rabotnički	1970
	Jasmin Sports Hall	2,500	Kavadarci	KK Feni Industries	
	SRC Kale	2,300	Skopje	KK Vardar	1998
	Park Sports Hall	2,500	Strumica	KK Strumica; RK Strumica	1981
	Independent Macedonia		Skopje	ŽKK Badel 1862	
	Rasadnik Hall	1,200	Skopje	OK Vardar; RK Vardar; RK Tineks Prolet	

== See also ==
- List of indoor arenas in Europe
- List of indoor arenas by capacity
