= Dauti =

Dauti is an Albanian surname derived from the name Daut. Notable people with the surname include:

- Esad Dauti (1937–2020), educationalist, member of parliament, environmentalist, and entomologist
- Sajmir Dauti (born 1938), Albanian footballer and coach
