= Daut (surname) =

Daut is a surname. Notable people with the surname include:

- Grete Daut (born 2000), Estonian footballer
- Ismail Daut (born 1956), Malaysian academic and politician
- Peter Daut (born 1983), American journalist
- Ryan Daut (born 1984), American poker player

== See also ==
- Daut
- Dautović
