= Abdulcelil Levni =

Ottoman court painter (1680s–1732)

Levnî Çelebi
- Born: Abdülcelil; 1680s Adrianople, Ottoman Empire
- Died: 1732; Constantinople, Ottoman Empire
- Education: Enderûn
- Notable work: Surname-i Hümayun; Silsilenâme

Signature
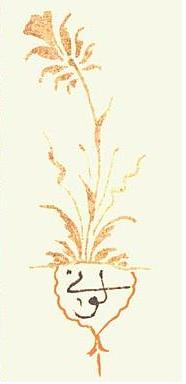

Abdülcelil Çelebi, also known as Levnî (1680s–1732), was an early 18th century Ottoman court painter at the court of Mustafa II and later Ahmed III. He was a prominent miniaturist during the Tulip Period, well-regarded for his traditional yet innovative style.

== Biography ==
Abdülcelil was born in Edirne and most likely belonged to a high class family in the empire because his title, Çelebi, means "gentleman".

As a young man, he journeyed to Constantinople, where he pursued studies at the painting academy located within the Topkapı Palace. Levnî began his work in Istanbul during Sultan Mustafa II's rule and eventually became chief painter (boyacı) at the palace atelier. During his stay at the palace, he specialized in the Saz style, which is characterized by stylized leaf designs. In spite of his high artist status, his name does not appear on a lists of artists working for the palace during his time. However, his signed artworks and influence on subsequent artists are evidence that he was an important artist of his time. Levnî died in Istanbul during the early 18th century.

Levni - "Levni, translated as 'colourist,' is renowned for his miniatures, which can be likened to a vibrant garden or a harmonious symphony of colors. This is why he became known as Levni, departing from his actual name, Abdülcelil Çelebi."

== Notable works ==
Levnî's most notable works include the Kebir Musavver Silsilename in Topkapi Palace Library (A3109), Surname-i Vehbi ("Book of Festivals") in the Library of Ahmed II in Topkapi Palace Museum, and an Album of miniatures at the Topkapi Palace Library.

=== Kebir Musaver Silsilmane, Topkapi Palace Museum Library ===
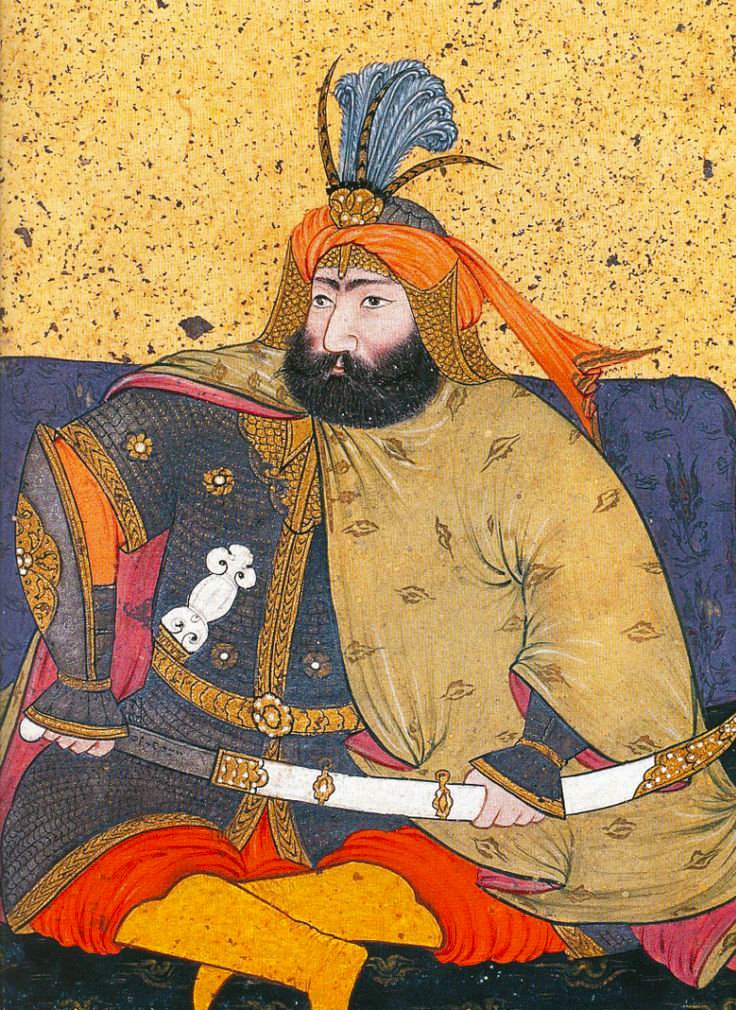
Portrait of Sultan Murad IV (1623-1640), from Levnî's Kebir Musavver Silsilname, Topkapi Palace Museum.

Also known as the Series of Sultan Portraits, this work contains twenty-three padishas, including portraits of Sultan Mahmud I, Sultan Osman III, Sultan Mustafa III, and Sultan Abdülhamid I. Gathering influence from western styles, particularly portraiture of Rafael, Levnî created a genealogical tree of the Sultans using images instead of text like traditional padishas.

Levnî's signature style in this work is evident in the size and color of the portraits in the book. His portraits are large (14.3 cm x 23.5 cm x 16.4 cm x 25 cm), and the subjects are turned 3/4 to the right or left of the view of the viewer. Additionally, he used a wide range of colors, both bright primary and pastel tones. His combination of color palettes was innovative for its time and gave way to a new style of Ottoman miniature art.

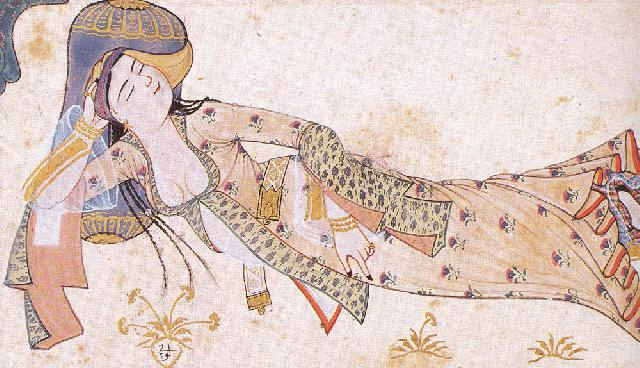
Young Woman, Sleeping Beauty. Portrait 11b from the Album by Levnî.

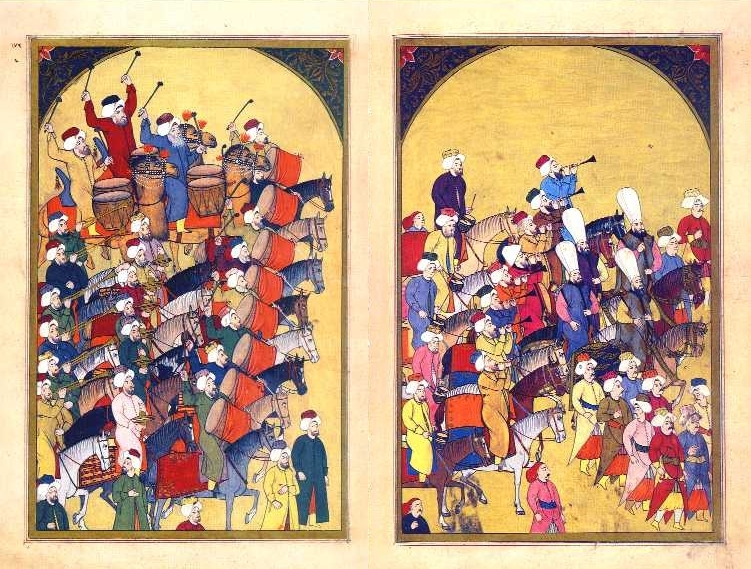
Miniature painting from the Surname-i Vehbi (folio 172a on the left and 171b on the right) by Levni.

=== Surname-i Vehbi ===
This exceptional work is a manuscript from the 18th Century, portraying a festival in Ottoman Istanbul. The original, housed in the Topkapi Palace Museum in Istanbul, features 137 vividly colored miniatures by Levni, a renowned painter from the court of Ahmed III (1703-1740). These miniatures vividly depict a fifteen-day festival celebrating the circumcision of four of the Sultan's sons in 1720. Surname-i Vehbi adheres to the longstanding Ottoman tradition of creating specially crafted books with both written content and illustrations to commemorate significant events like royal births and weddings. The festivities, including parades, musical performances, circus acts, and fireworks displays, are eloquently captured by Levni's artistic skill in his miniatures, most of which span two pages in this remarkable volume. The accompanying text for the book, authored by Vehbi, a renowned court poet, is presented in its entirety in this facsimile edition, offering a comprehensive glimpse into the historical celebration. Levnî was commissioned by Seyyd Hüseyin Vehbi to record the event in manuscript form. The miniatures in the Surname-i Vebbi are elaborate, capturing varying angles of movement in a wide range of colors and shapes. There is also evidence of the Persian influence in the paintings, some examples of which are the cultural objects in the background and the attire of some of the figures.

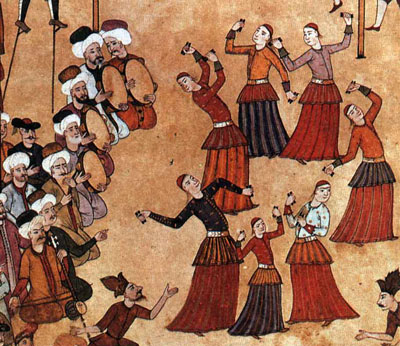
Scene from the Surname-i Vehbi.

=== Album Paintings ===
The Album paintings captures daily life in the Ottoman empire during the Tulip period. In it, Levnî painted portraits of various people of both noble and common backgrounds in different poses and doing everyday activities. Each image is separated form the others and has its own color composition and subject matter. The styles of attire, fabric patterns and the type of activities reflect the finery and richness of the Tulip Period.

=== Other works ===
Levni was also a notable poet and wrote on the subjects of heroism and war and daily life in the Ottoman empire. Some of his work are found in the poetry manuscript (Mecmua-i Es'ar, H1715) in the Treasure Library of Topkapi Palace Museum Library. Like his paintings, Levnî combined traditional styles of courts, particularly the aruz meter, as well as humor and popular language of the people in his poetry.

== Examples of Levnî's miniatures ==
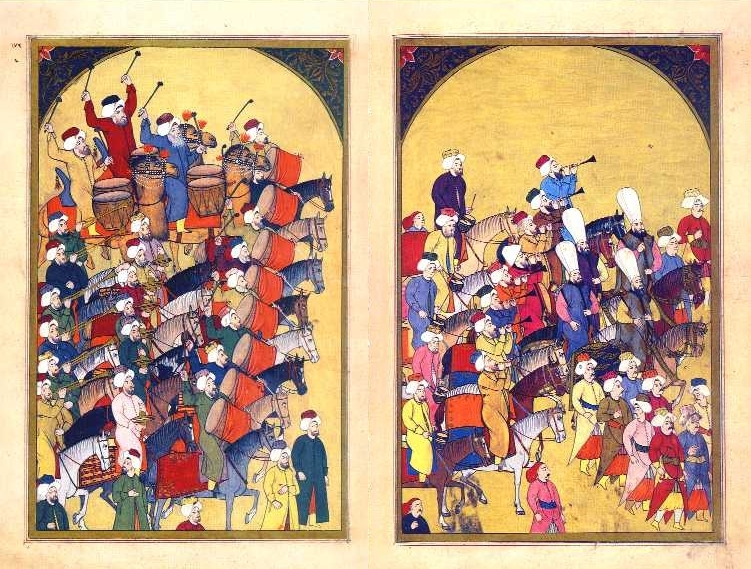

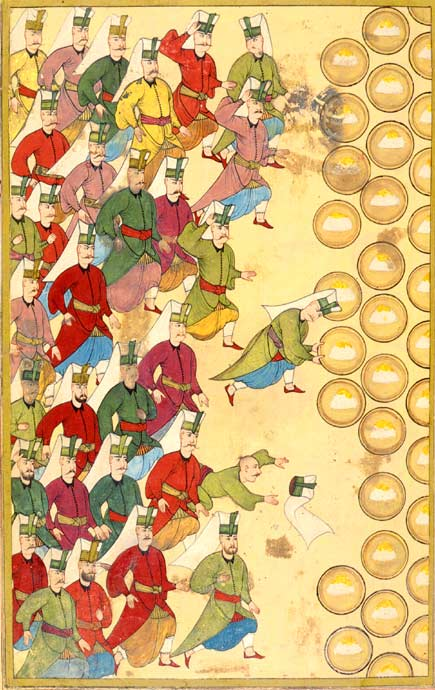

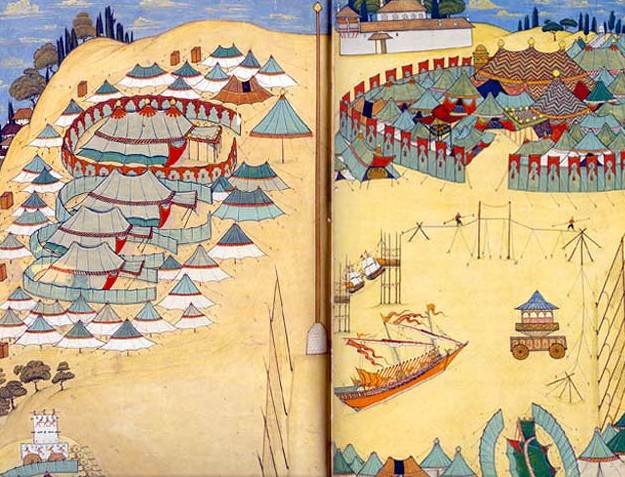

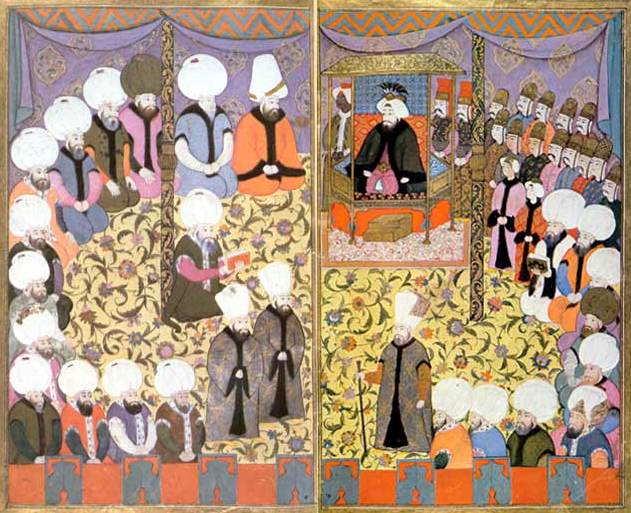

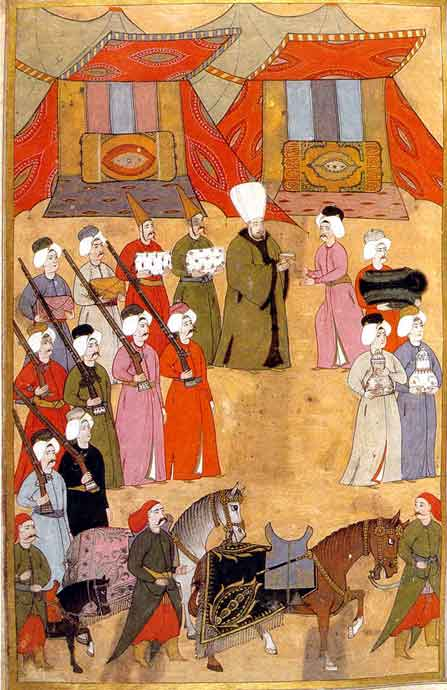

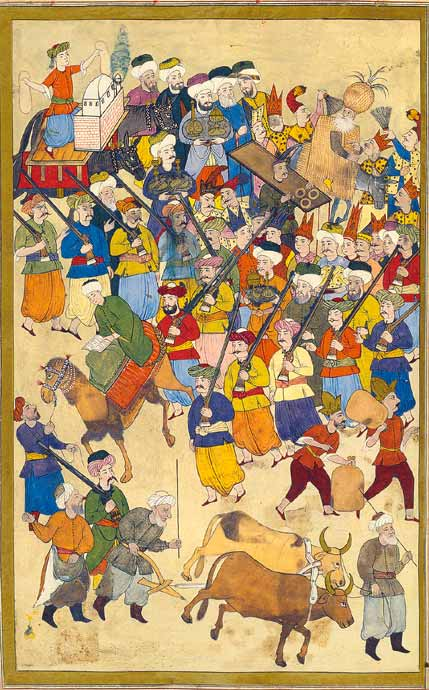

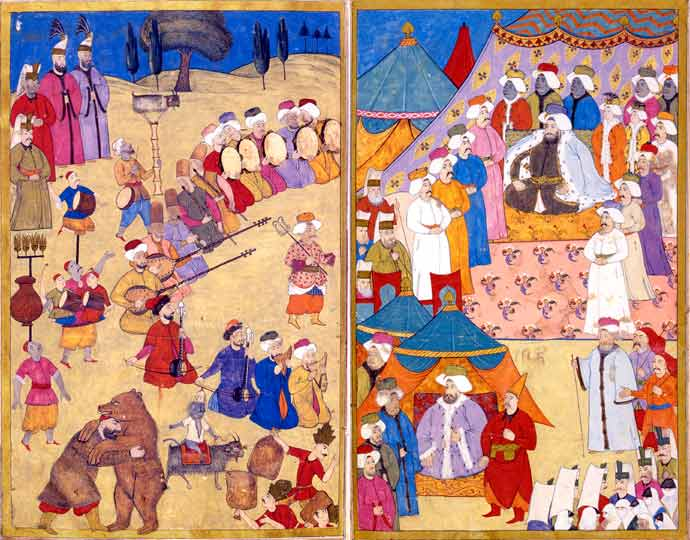

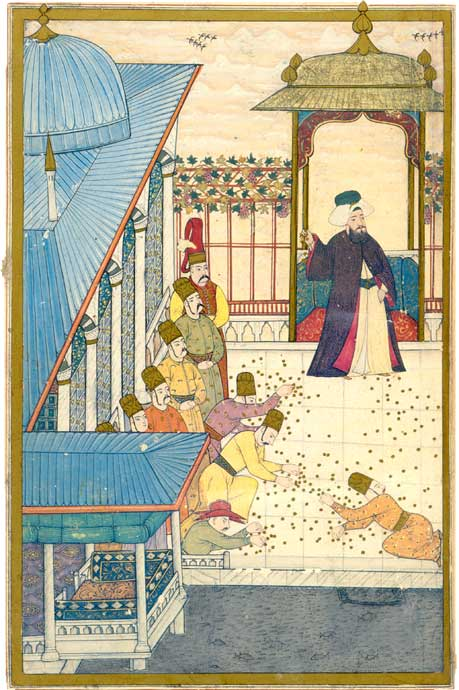

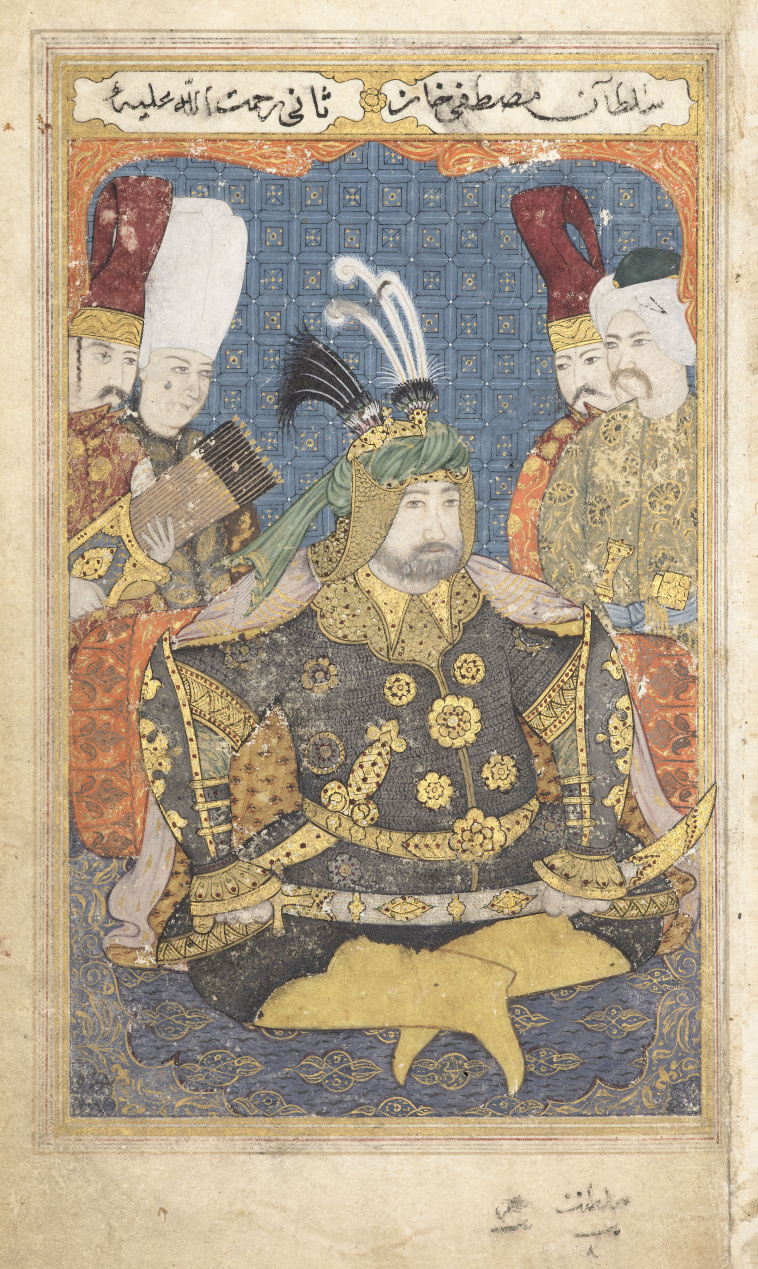

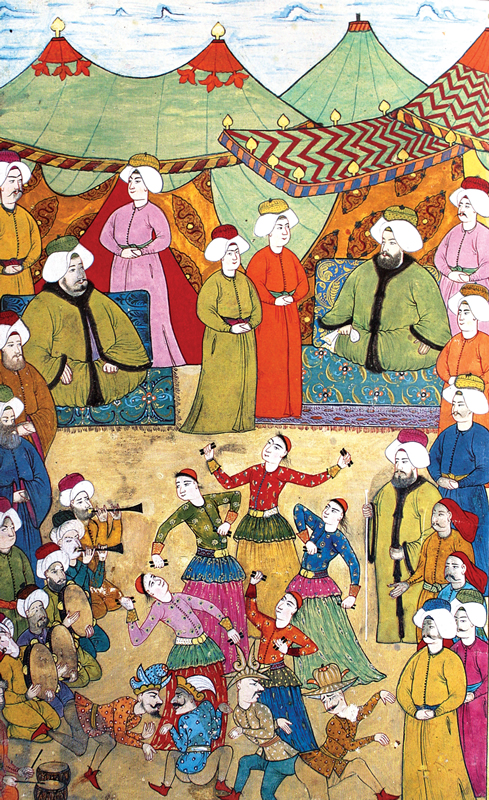

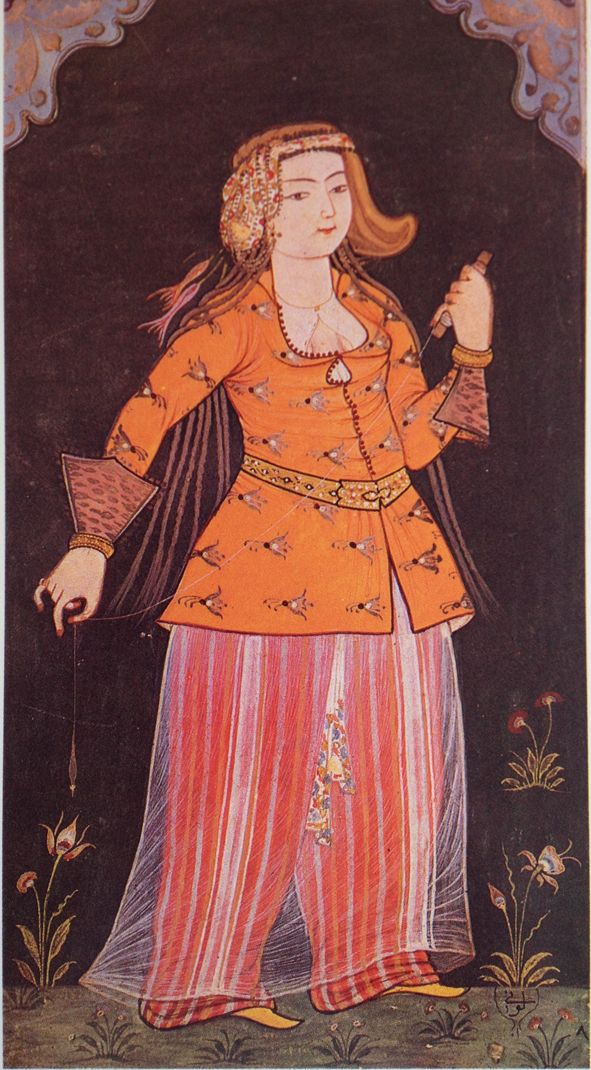

== See also ==
- Culture of the Ottoman Empire
