= Marko Miševski =

Macedonian handball player

Marko Mishevski
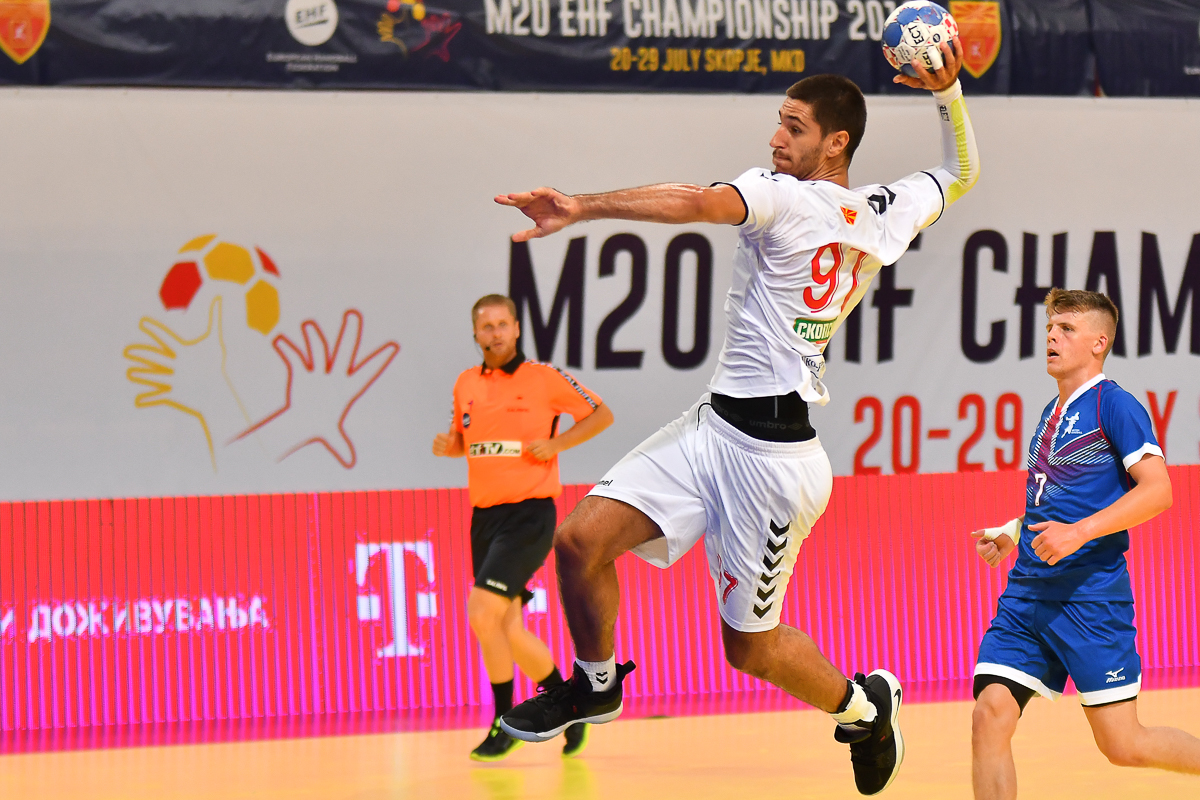

Personal information
- Nationality: Macedonian
- Born: 23 August 1999 (age 27) Skopje, Macedonia
- Height: 1.99 m (6 ft 6 in)

Sport
- Sport: Handball
- Position: Central back
- Current club: RK Sisak
- Number: 97

Youth career
- Years: Team
- –: RK Metalurg Skopje
- –: RK Vardar

Senior clubs
- Years: Team
- –: RK Vardar II
- –2019: RK Vardar Junior
- 2018–2019: RK Vardar
- 2019–02/2020: Grenoble SMH38
- 03/2020–2024: RK Vardar 1961
- 2024–2025: HBC Cournon-d'Auvergne
- 2025–12/2025: RK Tineks Prolet
- 01/2026–2026: Maccabi Rishon LeZion
- 2026–: RK Sisak
National team
Years	Team	Apps	(Gls)
2019–	North Macedonia	3	(0)

Marko Mishevski (Macedonian: Марко Мишевски) (born 23 August 1999) is a Macedonian handball player for RK Sisak.

He represented North Macedonia at the 2020 European Men's Handball Championship.

== Honors ==
- Macedonian Handball Super League

Winner:2019,2021, 2022

- Macedonian Handball Cup

Winner:2021, 2022, 2023

- EHF Champions League

Winner : 2018–19

- SEHA League

Winner : 2018–19

- IHF Super Globe

Third place: 2019
