= Zlatko Daskalovski =

Macedonian handball player (born 1984)

Personal information
- Nationality: Macedonian
- Born: 8 December 1984 (age 41) Struga, SR Macedonia, SFR Yugoslavia
- Height: 1.93 m (6 ft 4 in)

Sport
- Sport: Handball
- Position: Goalkeeper
- Current club: HC Tinex Prolet
- Number: 16

Senior clubs
- Years: Team
- 2004–2011: RK Vardar PRO
- 2011–2012: RK Tineks Prolet
- 2012–2013: RK Lovćen
- 2013: Ankara İl Özel İdare
- 2013–2014: RK Vardar
- 2014–2018: Poli Timişoara
- 2018–2019: Strasbourg Schiltigheim AHB
- 2019–2021: RK Butel Skopje
- 2021–2024: RK Golden Art
- 2024-: RK Prolet 62
National team
Years	Team	Apps	(Gls)
–	Macedonia	6	(0)

Teams managed
- 2021–2024: RK Golden Art (GK coach)
- 2024-: РК Пролет 62 (GK coach)

Zlatko Daskalovski (Macedonian: Златко Даскаловски) (born 8 December 1984) is a Macedonian handball player who plays for RK Golden Art and for the Macedonian national team.

He represented Macedonia at the 2019 World Men's Handball Championship.
