= Boris Trajkovski Sports Center =

Indoor sports arena in Skopje, North Macedonia

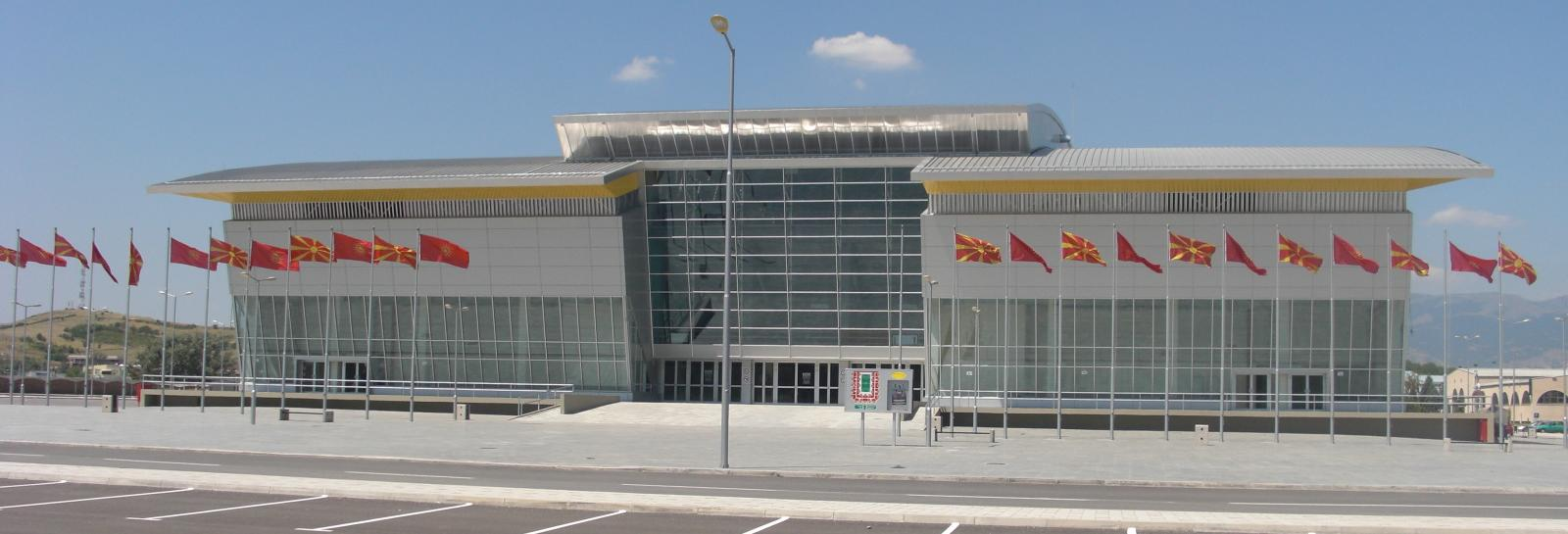
- Interactive map of Boris Trajkovski Sports Center
- Former names: Boris Trajkovski Sports Hall Vip Arena Boris Trajkovski (2016-2019) A1 Arena Boris Trajkovski (2019-2026)
- Location: Skopje, North Macedonia
- Coordinates: 42.0098°N 21.4039°E
- Owner: City of Skopje
- Operator: SC Boris Trajkovski
- Capacity: 10,000 (For concerts) (6,250 seats)

Construction
- Groundbreaking: June 2004
- Opened: 22 May 2008
- Cost: € 17 million
- Architect: Mavrovoproekt

Tenants
- North Macedonia national basketball team North Macedonia men's national handball team North Macedonia national volleyball team

The Boris Trajkovski Sports Center (Macedonian: Спортски центар Борис Трајковски, romanized: Sportski centar Boris Trajkovski) (now known as T Arena Boris Trajkovski due to sponsorship reasons) in Skopje is a multi-functional indoor sports arena. It is located in the Karpoš Municipality of Skopje, North Macedonia.

It is named after the former president, Boris Trajkovski, who died in a plane crash in 2004. It has a maximum seating capacity of 6.250 for handball, 7,200 for basketball and 10,000 for concerts. The venue also contains four restaurants and a sports bar. The arena is home to the North Macedonia national basketball team (men and women), North Macedonia national handball team (men and women) and North Macedonia national volleyball team (men and women).

== History ==
Construction began in June 2004 with the city of Skopje as the main investor. It was introduced as one of the capital projects of former mayor Risto Penov. The initial term set by the city authorities for the completion was one year, but it was repeatedly set back by problems during construction. At the beginning, while digging the foundation, underground water broke and the whole site was flooded. This brought additional costs of around one million euros, on several occasions the city coffers remained low, which at times led to stoppage of the resumption of the construction work.

Upon arrival by Trifun Kostovski as mayor, the city began negotiations with the government to hand over the facility in their jurisdiction. Negotiations were conducted with the previous government but had ended unsuccessfully. In February 2007, the government signed an agreement for the handover. A joint stock company "Boris Trajkovski" was established to manage the facility, with each investor receiving an appropriate number of shares by the money they invested for the final construction.

The Harlem Globetrotters, were first to perform at the arena following the opening ceremony on 22 May 2008. In 2011, a hockey rink and karting track were opened. The government had funded most of the investment, which was worth 430,000 euros.

It was one of two venues used for the 2008 European Women's Handball Championship and it will be used again in the 2022 European Women's Handball Championship which will host the preliminary and main rounds with Slovenia and Montenegro.

== Gallery ==
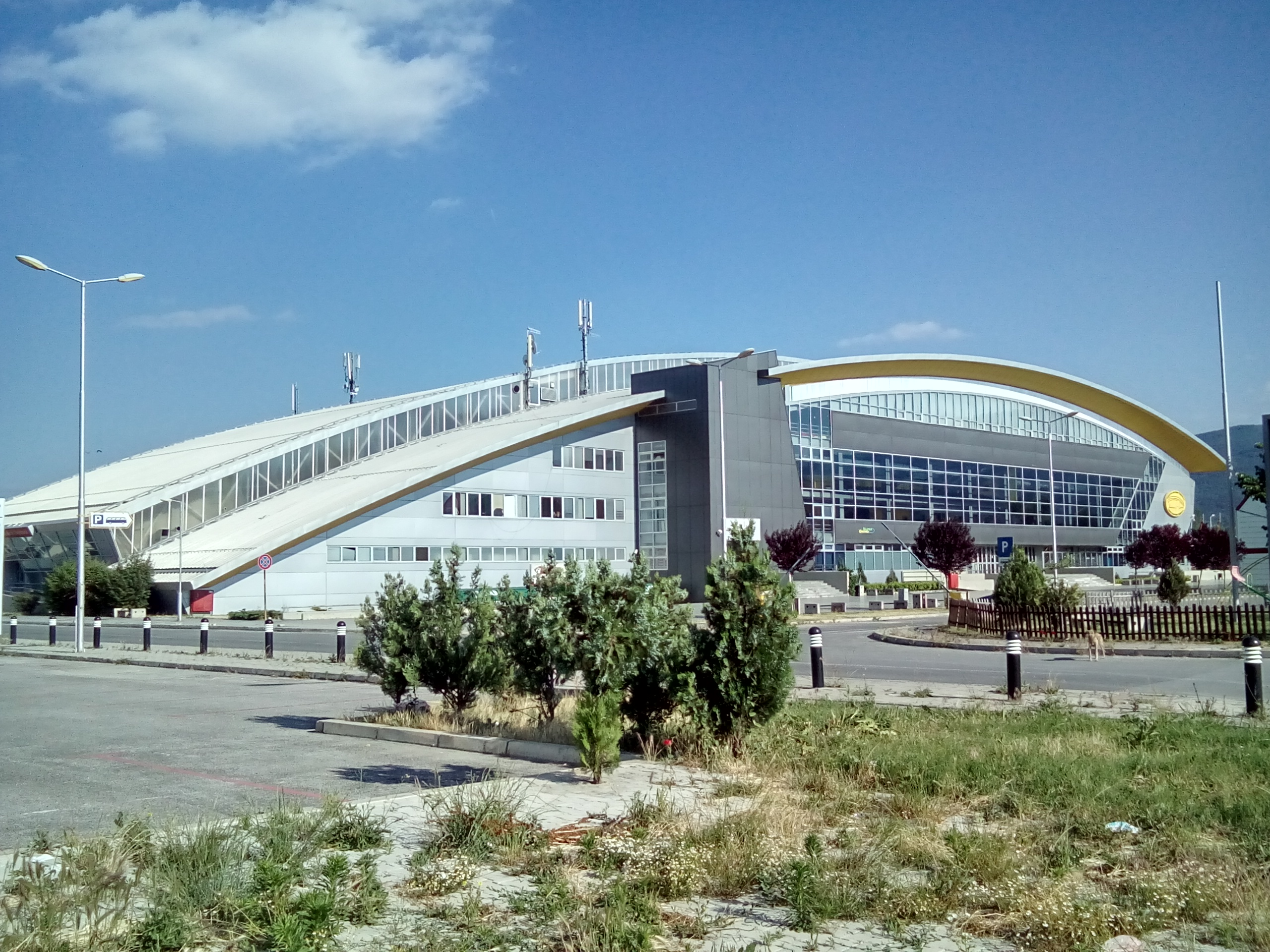
View from the side

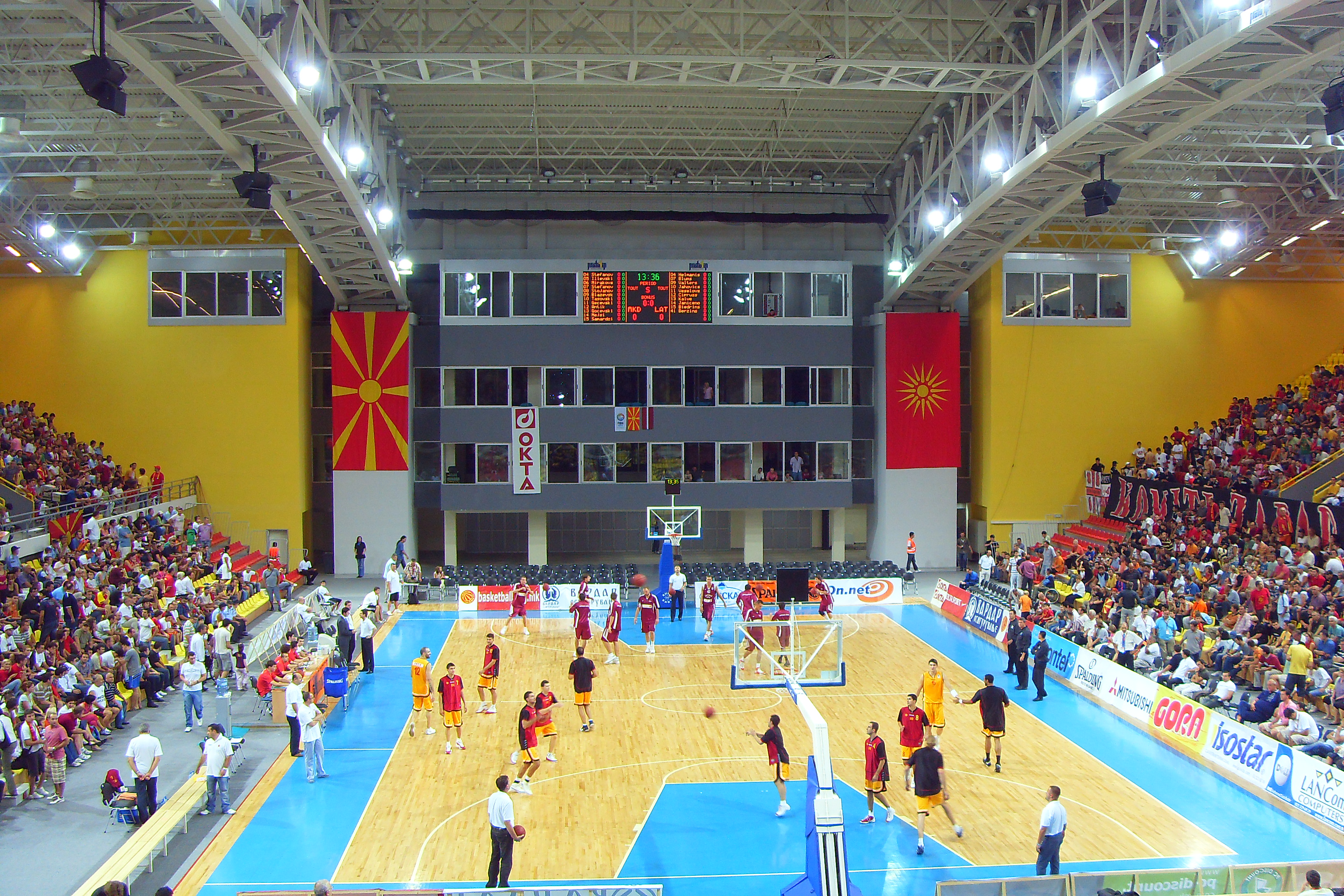
The eastern side of the Boris Trajkovski Sports Center

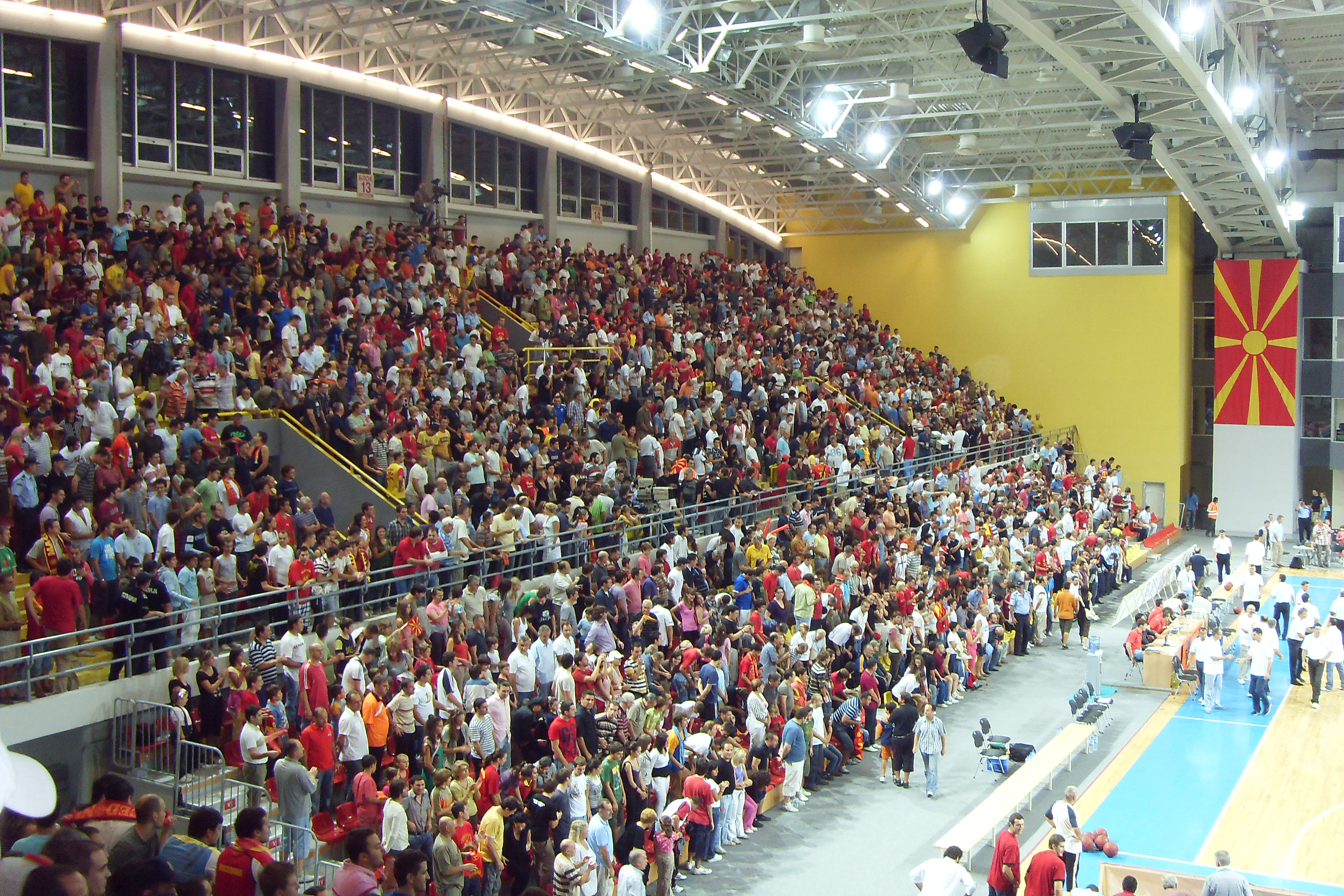
The northern side of the Boris Trajkovski Sports Center

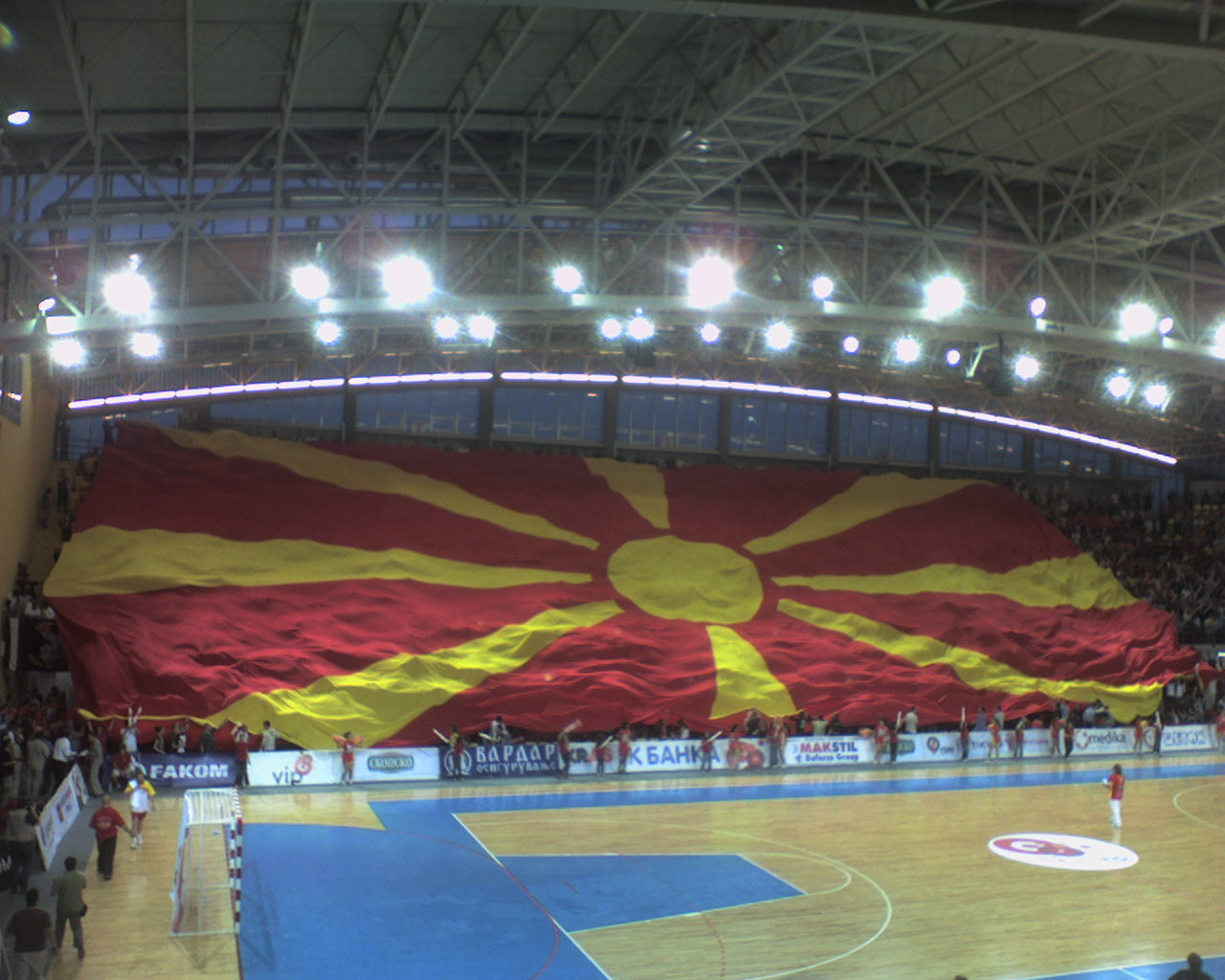
A big Macedonian flag

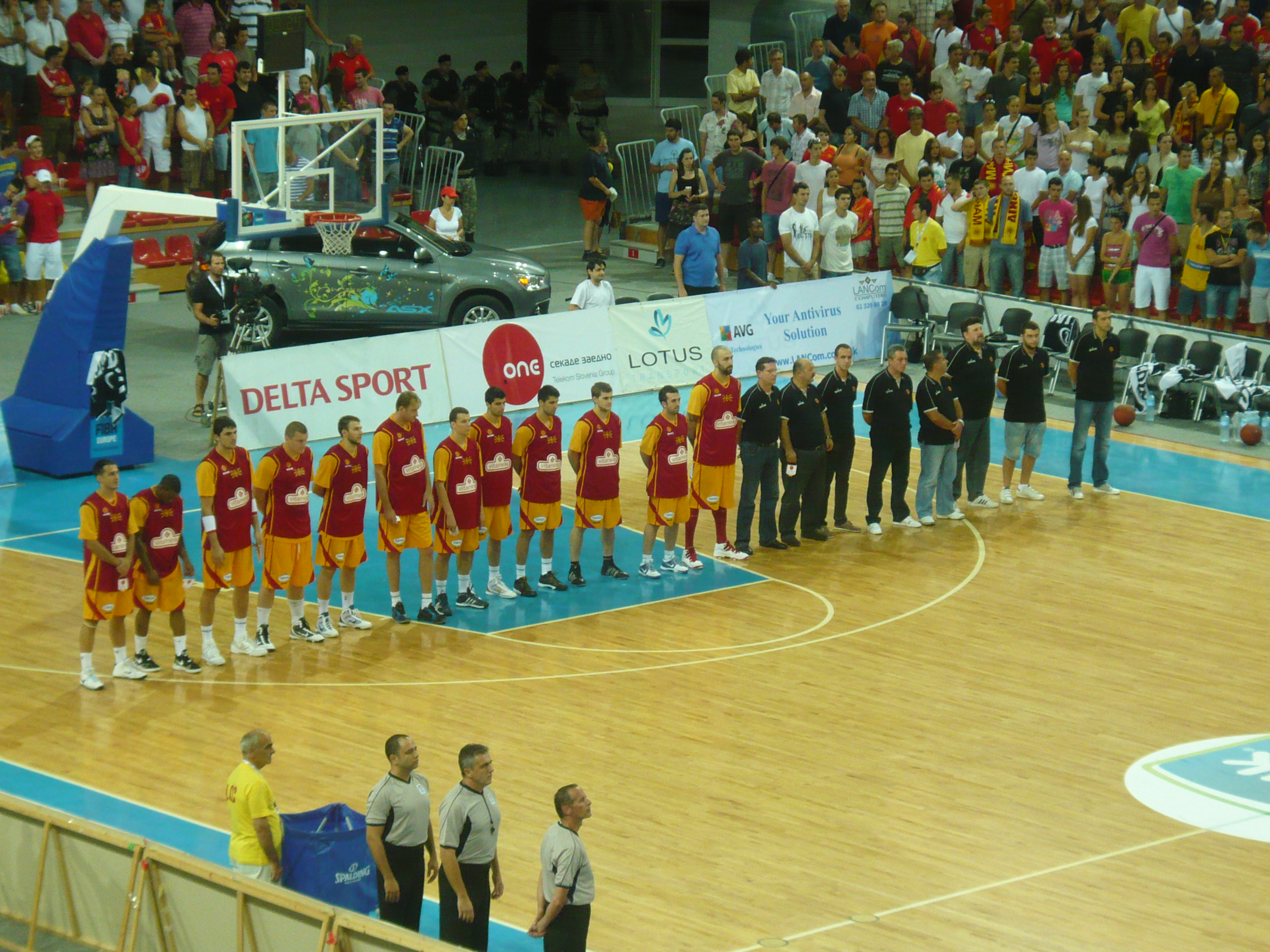
Macedonia basketball team prior to a match at the Boris Trajkovski Sports Center

== See also ==
- List of indoor arenas in North Macedonia

Preceded by Hovet; Stockholm	European Women's Handball Championship; Final Venue; 2008	Succeeded by Jyske Bank Boxen; Herning
