= Davor Palevski =

Macedonian handball player

Personal information
- Nationality: Macedonian
- Born: 26 February 1997 (age 29) Skopje, Macedonia
- Height: 1.82 m (6 ft 0 in)

Sport
- Sport: Handball
- Position: Left Wing
- Current club: RK Tineks Prolet
- Number: 71

Senior clubs
- Years: Team
- 2015–2018: (North Macedonia) RK Metalurg Skopje
- 2016–2017: (North Macedonia) RK Metalurg II
- 2018–2020: (North Macedonia) HC Rabotnichki
- 2020–: (North Macedonia) RK Tineks Prolet
National team
- Years: Team
- –: Macedonia

Davor Palevski (born 26 February 1997) is a Macedonian handball player who plays for RK Tineks Prolet.

He participated at the 2017 Men's Junior World Handball Championship.
