= Stefan Kimevski =

Macedonian handball player

Personal information
- Nationality: Macedonian
- Born: 31 December 1990 (age 35) Kumanovo, Macedonia
- Height: 1.93 m (6 ft 4 in)

Sport
- Sport: Handball
- Position: Goalkeeper
- Current club: Retired
- Number: 16

Senior clubs
- Years: Team
- 2010–2014: (North Macedonia) RK Metalurg Junior
- 2014–2019: (North Macedonia) RK Tineks Prolet
- 2019–2024: (North Macedonia) MRK Kumanovo
National team
- Years: Team
- –: Macedonia

Stefan Kimevski (Macedonian: Стефан Кимевски) (born 31 December 1990) is a retired Macedonian professional handball player.
