= Tulip Period =

Period in Ottoman history

The Tulip Period, or Tulip Era (Ottoman Turkish: لاله دورى, Turkish: Lâle Devri), is a period in Ottoman history from the Treaty of Passarowitz on 21 July 1718 to the Patrona Halil Revolt on 28 September 1730. This was a relatively peaceful period, during which the Ottoman Empire began to orient itself outwards.

The name of the period derives from the tulip craze among the Ottoman court society. Cultivating this culturally ambiguous emblem had become a celebrated practice. The Tulip Period illustrated the conflicts brought by early modern consumer culture. During this period the elite and high-class society of the Ottoman period had established an immense fondness for the tulip, which were utilized in various occasions. Tulips defined nobility and privilege, both in terms of goods and leisure time.

The Tulip Period, an era of relative peace and prosperity, saw a rebirth of Ottoman art and architecture (see Tulip Period architecture). During this period, Ottoman public buildings incorporated, for the first time, elements of western European designs, leading to the foundation of Ottoman Baroque architecture in the following decade.

== Rise and growth ==
Under the guidance of Sultan Ahmed III's son-in-law, Grand Vizier Nevşehirli Damat İbrahim Pasha, the Ottoman Empire embarked on new policies and programs during this period, which established the first Ottoman-language printing press during the 1720s, and promoted commerce and industry.

The Grand Vizier was concerned with improving trade relations and enhancing commercial revenues, which would help to explain the return to gardens and the more public style of the Ottoman court during this period. The Grand Vizier was himself very fond of tulip bulbs, setting an example for Istanbul's elite who started to cherish the tulip's endless variety in paint and celebrate its seasonality as well.

The Ottoman standard of dress and its commodity culture incorporated their passion for the tulip. Within Istanbul, one could find tulips from the flower markets to the plastic arts to silks and textiles. Tulip bulbs could be found everywhere; the demand grew within the elite community where they could be found in homes and gardens.

Therefore, the tulip is a symbol with mythical appeal, which can be found from Ottoman palaces to their clothing, which sustains a memory of the Ottoman Empire's social past. The tulip can be seen as a romantic monument representing the wealthy and elite, and the fragility of despotic rule.

== Culture ==
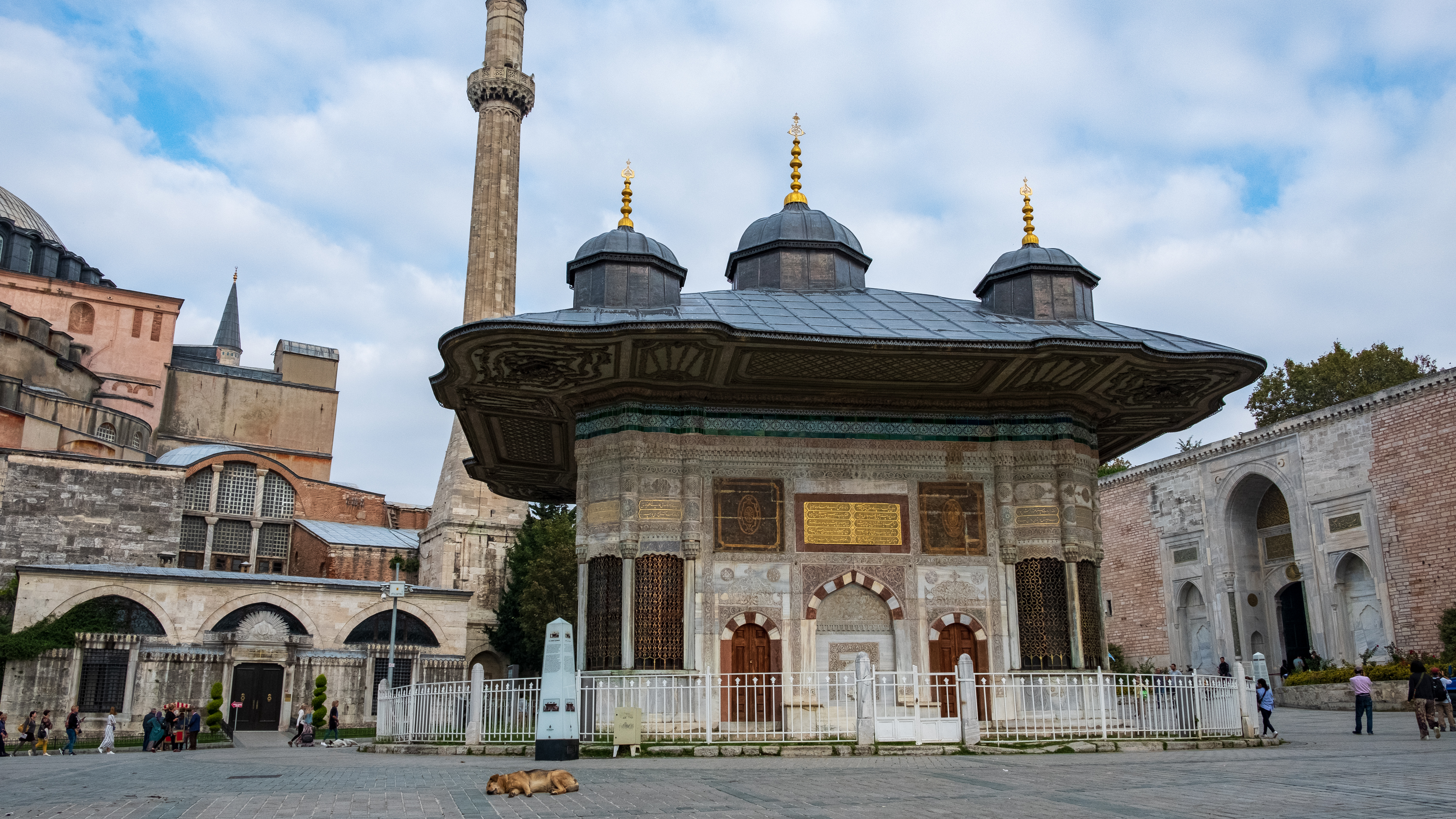
The Fountain of Ahmed III is an iconic example of Tulip Period architecture

The Tulip Period saw a flowering of arts, culture and architecture. Compared with the earlier classical style of Ottoman architecture, architecture and decoration in this period became more ornate and favoured floral motifs, being influenced by the Baroque style in Europe. An iconic example is the Fountain of Ahmed III built in 1728 in front of Topkapı Palace in Istanbul, one of many fountains and sebils built in this period. In addition to European influences, the architecture of the Tulip Period was also influenced by Safavid art and architecture to the east. The return of the sultan's court to Istanbul – after a period of residence in Edirne in the late 17th century – resulted in renewed building activity in the capital. Significant efforts were also made to repair or restore many of the city's older buildings. Ahmed III's grand vizier, Nevşehirli Damat Ibrahim Pasha, was in large part responsible for stimulating this construction and restoration activity. According to scholar Ünver Rüstem, the patronage of Ahmet III's court in the realm of architecture and culture in this period was part of an effort to reengage the public with its rulers after the latter had become secluded during the royal court's time in Edirne.

One of the most important creations of the Tulip Period was the Sadâbâd Palace, a new summer palace designed and built by Damat Ibrahim Pasha in 1722–1723 for Ahmed III. It was located at Kâğıthane, a rural area on the outskirts of the city with small rivers that flow into the Golden Horn inlet. The palace grounds included a long marble-lined canal, the Cedval-i Sim, around which were gardens, pavilions, and palace apartments in a landscaped setting. This overall design probably emulated French pleasure palaces, following the descriptions of Paris and Versailles brought to the sultan's court by Yirmisekiz Çelebi Mehmed Efendi in 1721. In addition to his own palace, the sultan encouraged members of his court to build their own pavilions along the canal, while the regular inhabitants of Istanbul also used the surrounding area as a recreational ground for excursions and picnics. This was a novel practice in Ottoman culture that brought the public within close proximity of the ruler for the first time. It was often described or illustrated by contemporary art and literature, such as in the poems of Nedîm and in the Zenanname (Book of Women") by Enderûnlu Fâzıl.

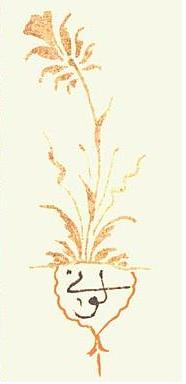
Drawing of a tulip by Abdulcelil Levni (1720)

The tulip was also praised in poetry and motifs used in paintings. To this day in modern Turkey the tulip is still considered the embodiment of perfection and beauty. Turkish Airlines decorates its planes with a painting of a tulip on its fuselage.

== Important figures during the period ==
- Nevşehirli Damat İbrahim Pasha (1718–1730) was the Grand Vizier of the Empire and the husband of Fatma Sultan, the favorite and most influential Sultan's daughter; therefore the period is delineated over his vizierate rather than Sultan Ahmed III
- Grand Admiral Mustafa Pasa – was the son-in-law of the Grand Vizier and is remembered for establishing forty-four new tulip breeds
- Ibrahim Muteferrika – a Hungarian who had established the first Ottoman printing press which was seen as a landmark of the period
- Esad of Ioannina – a Greek polymath, polyglot scholar, translator and a prominent Muslim physicist, philosopher and astronomer. The personal librarian of Sultan Ahmed III, he was the first person who translated Aristotle in the Ottoman Empire and was also crucial in establishing the first printing press in the Ottoman Empire, alongside Ibrahim Muteferrika.
- Nedim – a poet who broke new ground by challenging the traditional canon while writing in a classical Ottoman format.
- Abdulcelil Levni – an outstanding miniature painter who began to work in Edirne to Istanbul where he studied painting and became the court painter where the Ottoman tradition of miniature albums was revived. These albums that Levni painted were called Tulip albums which mirrored the structure of the state itself, ranking distinguished members of the regime according to horticultural achievements.
- Ahmed III - was Sultan of the Ottoman Empire from 1703 to 1730. He is best known for the Tulip Period, a time of cultural, artistic, and intellectual flourishing. His reign ended when the Patrona Halil Rebellion forced his abdication due to social unrest and dissatisfaction with elite extravagance.
- Mahmud I - was the sultan of the Ottoman Empire from 1730 to 1754. He assumed the throne after the suppression of the Patrona Halil Rebellion, and wanted to restore stability and order to the empire. His reign included military conflicts and diplomatic negotiations. Most notably a war that concluded with the Treaty of Belgrade in 1739 and as well as internal efforts at reform and urban renewal.

== Decline and end ==
Tulip prices began to rise in the last decades of the 17th century and peaked in 1726–1727 before state intervention. This reflected the demand for the inflated value of the rare bulbs and escalating demands for flowers in the elite's palaces and gardens.

Tulip mania demonstrated the state's power to regulate the economy by increasing the prices for bulbs. Courtiers at the time forwarded a petition to denounce the practice of flower sellers, whom they perceived to be taking advantage of the elite by raising the prices of the bulbs. This led to the process of issuing inventories of flowers and price lists to the judge of Istanbul for enforcement.

== Criticism of the term ==
Some recent historians of the Ottoman Empire, such as Cemal Kafadar and Can Erimtan, have criticized the term "Tulip Period" as a historiographical construct made up in the early 20th century rather than an accurate reflection of historical reality. The term was popularized by historian Ahmed Refik Altınay, who sought to reframe an era that 19th-century Ottoman authorities like Ahmed Cevdet and Mustafa Nuri had previously condemned as "Tulip Entertainments," which they associated with moral decay and hedonistic excess. This view of the Tulip Period persisted well into the 1920s and 1930s.

Erimtan argues that many characterizations of the period are anachronistic; for example, the notion of the Tulip Period was characterized by a "serious movement towards a secular society" is considered inaccurate as the concept of secularism developed much later. Similarly, the idea of the "Tulip Age" as the inception of Ottoman Westernization has been challenged as a "wishful invention" of early 20th-century intellectuals, with some historical perspectives from the 1930s emphasizing the "Oriental flair" of its festivities over European influence. Erimtan argues the above-mentioned Sadâbad Palace was not modeled after French palaces but rather was inspired by the garden palaces of the Safavid capital of Isfahan. The Ottomans were at war with the Safavid Empire during this period and Erimtan speculates that the Sadâbad Palace served as a form of cultural competition with the Safavids.

== See also ==
- Culture of the Ottoman Empire
- Jean-Baptiste van Mour
