= RK Tineks Prolet =

Macedonian handball club

(North Macedonia) HC PROLET 62
- Full name: Rakometen klub Prolet
- Founded: 1962
- Arena: Rasadnik Hall, Skopje
- Capacity: 1,200
- Head coach: Nikola Matlieski
- League: Macedonian Super League
- 2025–26: ?
- Club colours
Home	Away

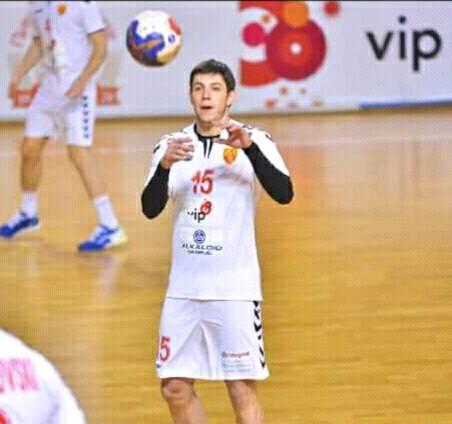
Lasko Andonovski legendary player 13 seasons in RK Prolet

RK Prolet (HC Prolet) (Macedonian: РК Пролет) is a team handball club from Skopje, Republic of North Macedonia. Currently, they compete in the Macedonian Handball Super League. The name Prolet comes after the Skopje settlement of Prolet.

The club's main rival was RK Jug, now a defunct club who was from the neighboring settlement of Muchurin.

The team used to play in an open arena located in the settlement of Prolet, but after its dissolution changed few handball arenas around Skopje as Avtokomanda in the same called settlement and Rasadnik in Kisela Voda. Since 2012, the club finally is back in its own settlement as the Makedonsko Sonce Arena was built.

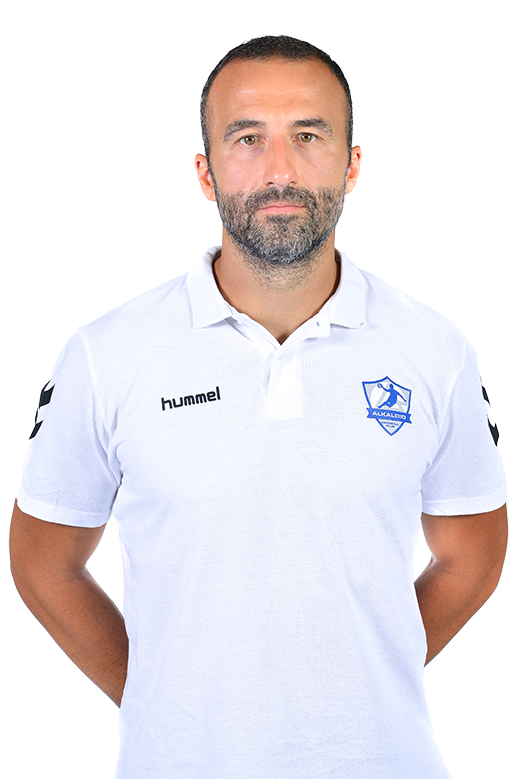
Jane Cvetkovski the legendary Prolet goalkeeper 2007-2014

== Crest, colours, supporters ==
=== Kits ===
HOME
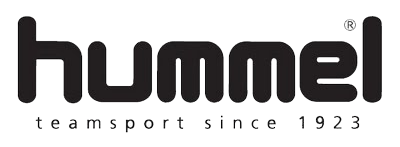
2023–24

AWAY
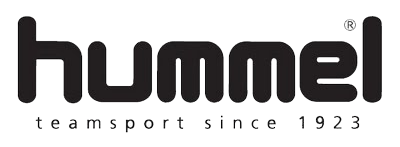
2022–23

== Makedonsko Sonce Arena ==
Prolet's home arena is Makedonsko Sonce Gym. It's a small Gym with 1,000 seats. Its European cup matches HC Prolet plays at Jane Sandanski Arena or Boris Trajkovski Arena.

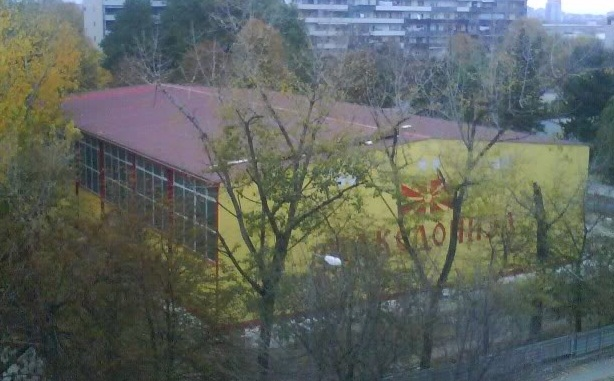
Makedonsko Sonce Gym

== Honours ==
=== Domestic competitions (North Macedonia) ===
- Macedonian Champions

1973, 1974

- Macedonian Handball Cup (North Macedonia)

Winners Gold : 1972, 1975

=== European record (European Union) ===
- EHF Challenge Cup

2009-10 : 2nd round
2011-12 : 3rd round
2015-16 : 3rd round

- EHF European League

2018-19 : 1st round
2021-22 : 1st round

== Current squad ==
Squad for the 2025–26 season

Goalkeepers

- 16 (North Macedonia) Zlatko Daskalovski

Right Wingers

- 24 (North Macedonia) Nikola Stoilevski

Left Wingers

- 44 (North Macedonia) Esad Drpljanin
- 71 (North Macedonia) Davor Palevski

Line players

- 7 (North Macedonia) Stefan Jovevski
- 8 (North Macedonia) Andrej Gligorov
- 22 (North Macedonia) Stefan Stojchevikj

Left Backs

- 9 (North Macedonia) Aleksandar Vasilevski
- 17 (North Macedonia) Gorazd Damcevski

Central Backs

- 10 (North Macedonia) Darko Krstevski
- 15 (North Macedonia) Lasko Andonovski

Right Backs

- 19 (North Macedonia) Done Majnov
- 96 (North Macedonia) Kristijan Davitkovski

=== Transfers ===
Transfers for the 2026–27 season

Joining

Leaving

- (North Macedonia) Tomislav Dimkovski (CB) to (North Macedonia) GRK Tikveš
- (North Macedonia) Marko Trajkovski (LP) to (North Macedonia) MRK Kumanovo
- (North Macedonia) Andrej Stojanovski (LB) to (North Macedonia) RK Prilep 2010
- (North Macedonia) Marko Trajkov (GK) to (North Macedonia) RK Eurofarm Pelister 2
- (North Macedonia) Bojan Solev (GK) (to (North Macedonia) GRK Tikveš)
- (North Macedonia) Marko Gjorcheski (LB) (to (North Macedonia) RK Vardar)
- (North Macedonia) Trajce Kostov (CB) (to (North Macedonia) HC Butel Skopje)
- (North Macedonia) Luka Jovikj (RW) (to (North Macedonia) HC Butel Skopje)

=== Transfer History ===
Transfers for the 2025–26 season

Joining

Leaving

- (North Macedonia) Andrej Petkovski (GK) to (Poland) KS Azoty-Puławy
- (North Macedonia) Marko Mishevski (LB) to (Israel) Maccabi Rishon LeZion

== Former notable players ==
- (North Macedonia) Jane Cvetkovski
- (North Macedonia) Zlatko Daskalovski
- (North Macedonia) Stefan Kimevski
- (North Macedonia) Petar Angelov
- (North Macedonia) Jovica Mladenovski
- (North Macedonia) Mitko Stoilov
- (North Macedonia) Martin Manaskov
- (North Macedonia) Ivan Djonov
- (North Macedonia) Slavisha Dimitrijeski
- (North Macedonia) Branislav Angelovski
- (North Macedonia) Goran Kuzmanoski
- (North Macedonia) Tomislav Jagurinovski
- (North Macedonia) Vlatko Jovchevski
- (North Macedonia) Martin Popovski
- (North Macedonia) Darko Janev
- (North Macedonia) Mihail Alarov
- (Serbia) Đorđe Golubović
- (Montenegro) Žarko Pejović
