= Esat Stavileci =

Albanian jurist (1942–2015)

Esat Stavileci (11 July 1942 – 15 August 2015) was a Kosovan lawyer and professor at the Faculty of Law of the University of Pristina.

== Biography ==
Esat Stavileci was born on 11 July 1942 in Gjakova. He completed his primary and secondary education there. He studied law at the University of Pristina. He continued his postgraduate legal studies at the Faculty of Law at the University of Zagreb, and further pursued higher studies in comparative law in France, Italy, and the Netherlands. He obtained his doctorate in law from the Faculty of Law at the University of Sarajevo in 1974.

From 1965 until his retirement, Stavileci worked as a professor at the Faculty of Law at the University of Pristina. After retiring, he continued to lead master's and doctoral studies. In 2000, he was elected a regular member of the Academy of Sciences and Arts of Kosovo. Besides teaching at the University of Pristina, he also lectured at the State University of Tetova, the South East European University in Tetovo, and served as a visiting professor at several other universities.

Stavileci was a founder and president of the Association for Administrative Theory and Practice, authoring numerous books in this field. He was one of the most prolific authors in the areas of constitutional and political legal science. His scholarly presence began in 1967 as a participant in the scientific symposium "Autonomous Provinces in Yugoslavia," and for nearly half a century, through many papers and public presentations, he argued for the protection of Kosovo's constitutional position and the advancement of its status within the former Yugoslavia.

Throughout his life, Esat Stavileci authored several books and co-authored others, contributing significantly to legal scholarship. He died on 15 August 2015 in Pristina and was buried in Gjakova two days later. Among those who attended the funeral were Atifete Jahjaga (President of Kosovo from 2011 to 2016), Isa Mustafa (Prime Minister of Kosovo from 2014 to 2017), Arsim Bajrami (Kosovar Minister of Science and Technology), and Hivzi Islami (Chairman of the Academy of Sciences and Arts of Kosovo).

== Publications ==
- "The Dissolution of Former Yugoslavia and the Albanian Question" (1994)
- "Hyrje në shkencat administrative" (1997),
- "Nocione dhe parime të administratës publike" (2005)
- "The Truth about Kosova: Arguments and Facts in Support of Its Independence", (2007)
- "Shteti, shqyrtime të përgjithshme teorike me vështrim rasti i Kosovës” (2008),
- "Fjalor shpjegues i termave administrativë" (2010),
- "Në mbrojtje të pavarësisë së Kosovës” (1998),
- "Vazhdimësia e mendimit për Kosovën dhe çështjen shqiptare" (2001),
- "Kosova dhe çështja shqiptare në udhëkryqet e kohës" (2005)
