= Esad of Ioannina =

18th century Ottoman Greek polymath

Esad of Ioannina (Turkish: Yanyalı Esad Efendi; Arabic: أسعد بن علي بن عثمان اليانيوي; Asʿad ibn ʿAlī ibn ʿUthmān al-Yānyawī; d. c. 1730) was an Ottoman Greek polymath, polyglot scholar, translator and a prominent Muslim physicist, philosopher and astronomer. He is considered "one of the most interesting intellectual figures of the first quarter of the eighteenth century".

A major figure of the Tulip Era, he served as the personal librarian of Sultan Ahmed III. Considered "the most erudite man in the Ottoman Empire", Esad was the first person who translated Aristotle in the Ottoman Empire, translating his works into Arabic instead of Turkish, as he preferred the former. He was crucial in establishing the first printing press in the Ottoman Empire.

== Early life ==
Esad was born in the late 1600s in the city of Ioannina. His parents were Greek converts to Islam and, as such, he was a native speaker of the Greek language. He received his primary education under the mufti of the city and another local scholar. He travelled to Constantinople in 1686 and studied in various madrasas, on mathematics and astronomy.

== Career ==
Esad of Ioannina began his career by aiding Dimitrie Cantemir in logically organizing his material. He influenced Cantemir to write his famous Book of Science of Music. He also taught the Turkish language to Cantemir; he was also the teacher and client of John Mavrocordatos and Chrysanthos Notaras. Excluding philosophy, Esad was knowledgeable in astronomy, mathematical sciences, philosophy, and Euclidian geometry.

Esad served as the personal librarian of Sultan Ahmed III and translated Porphyry's Isagoge and the first four books of Aristotle's Organon and Physics, as well as Ioannis Kottounios' Commentarii lucidissimi in octo libros de physico auditu Aristotelis. He also helped circulate Avicenna's Kitāb al-Šifāʾ within his school, and potentially produced his (now lost) own work concerning Aristotelian logic, as suggested by several marginalia. Kottounios' work and Esad's translation of it was extremely important for the Ottoman court, as evidenced by his pay rising to the levels of the pay of the Judge of Galata, an exceptionally high-ranking and prestigious position within the Ottoman Empire's judicial and administrative hierarchy.

Esad aimed to create a "union of modern Greek and Islamic learning" and address the prevailing ignorance of Aristotle's and Avicenna's ideas among Ottoman scholars through his translation efforts. He was well-regarded by his contemporaries, Muslim and Christian alike. Esad's European acquaintances wrote about him variously as "a follower of Aristotle", "soaked in Democritean philosophy", "the most erudite man in the Ottoman Empire", and a cosmopolitan socialite. An Ottoman court intellectual and a contemporary of Esad called him a "pious and well-educated Muslim scholar with an exemplary career and an extraordinary command of Arabic" who frequented "Greek circles".

Esad's translations were the work of Esad himself and two young Greek assistants, who received permanent tax exemptions from the Sultan (their families did not pay taxes for generations). This suggests that Ahmed, himself a half-Greek, sought to bring forth a philosophical tradition in the Ottoman Empire, which largely lacked intellectual depth. In 1727, Sultan Ahmed issued an imperial firman that officially authorized the establishment of the first Muslim-operated printing press in the Ottoman Empire, in order to combat the social backwardness which plagued his realm. Esad was one of the four designated proof-readers named in Ahmed's firman. He then proceeded to become a member of the committee formed for the revision and copyediting of works to be printed in the printing house. Esad's promotion and translation of works regarding Aristotelian philosophy motivated the establishment of this printing press.

== Death ==
Esad died in obscurity soon after the uprising of Patrona Halil in 1730, in which Sultan Ahmed lost the throne.
