= Esad Kuhinja =

Bosnian footballer

Personal information
- Date of birth: 10 August 1963 (age 63)
- Place of birth: Brodarevo, SFR Yugoslavia
- Position: Defender

Senior career*
Years	Team	Apps	(Gls)
–1983	Jasen Brodarevo		
1983–1985	OFK Titograd	3	(0)
1986	Metalac Gornji Milanovac		
1986–1987	Trepça	7	(0)
1987–1989	Čelik Zenica	56	(2)
1990	FAP Priboj		
1991–1994	Napredak Kruševac	16	(0)
1994–1995	Preußen Münster	6	(0)
- * Club domestic league appearances and goals

Esad Kuhinja (born 10 August 1963) is a Bosnian retired footballer.

== Club career ==
He started his career playing with Jasen Brodarevo. Then he played OFK Titograd, FK Metalac, NK Čelik Zenica and FK Napredak Kruševac before moving to Germany where he played with SC Preußen Münster.
