= Esad Erbili =

Ottoman sheikh and writer (1847–1931)

Personal life
- Born: 1847 Erbil, Mosul, Ottoman Empire
- Died: March 1931 (aged 83–84) Menemen, İzmir, Turkey
- Main interest(s): Sufism, Islamic art, Turkology

Religious life
- Religion: Islam
- Denomination: Sunni
- Jurisprudence: Hanafi
- Tariqa: Naqshbandi
- Creed: Maturidi

Muslim leader
- Influenced by: Abu al-Hassan al-Kharaqani, Baha' al-Din Naqshband, Ahmad Sirhindi, Abu Hanifa, Abu Mansur al-Maturidi, Mirza Mazhar Jan-e-Janaan

Esad Erbili or Mehmed Esad Efendi (1847 – March 1931) was a sheikh of the Naqshi-Khalidi Sufi order. At the beginning of World War I, he took a branch of the Naqshbandiyah school of thought to Istanbul.

== Early years ==
Esad Erbili was born in Arbil (present-day Kurdistan Region, Iraq) in 1847. He was the 30th Chain of the Golden Silsila, entitled to the honorific title Sayyid on both his mother's and father's side. His father, Master M. Said, was the Sheikh of Khalidî tekke in Arbil, while his grandfather, Master Hidayetullah, was a khalifa. After Erbili completed his education in Arbil and Deyr, he became affiliated with the Naqshi-Khalidi Sheikh Taha’l-Hariri at age 23. Five years later he was given the degree of the caliphate.

== Career in Istanbul ==
Returning from Hajj after the death of Sheikh al-Hariri, Erbili came to Istanbul in 1875. He first stayed at the Besiraga Dargah in Salkimsogut, but when his followers and visitors increased, he left and settled in the muezzin room of a mosque in Bayezid-Parmakkapi. He taught the Divān of Hafez and Luccet-ul Asrar of Mawlana Jamii in the Fatih Mosque. Hodja Master Yekta and other scholars took notice of these lessons and affiliated themselves with him.

In a short time, his reputation spread throughout Istanbul. The sultan's son-in-law, Darwish Pashazade Khalid Pasha, invited Erbili to the palace to learn Arabic and religious sciences from him. He was appointed to the rank of Majles-i Mashayih by Sultan Abdul Hamid II. In the meantime, he moved his house to one of the rooms over the Bayezid Mosque gates. He also appealed for a tekke. At that time, Kadiri Dargah was free, but its sheikh was required to have a Kadiri authorization. Erbili was appointed after receiving this authorization from one of the grandchildren of Abdul Kadir Gilani, Abdulhameed er-Refqani.

Erbili was exiled to Arbil in 1900, but returned to Istanbul in 1910 to establish a dargah in Üsküdar. In 1914, he was appointed chairman of the Assembly of Sheikhs (The Council of Islamic Teachers, or Meclis-i Meşâyıh) in Istanbul. He served in this role until the council was closed in 1915.

== Menemen incident and death ==
As part of Atatürk's Reforms, the tekke in Istanbul was banned and closed and Erbili was imprisoned along with his son, Mehmed, because they were suspected of involvement in the 1930 Menemen Incident in İzmir. Erbili was initially sentenced to death, but the sentence was reduced to life in jail due to his old age. He died shortly afterward in a military hospital in İzmir.

== Writings ==
- Kenzul-Irfan - A translation of and commentary on 100,000 hadith.
- Maktubat (Mektubat) - A collection of letters to his students.
- Divan - Kurdish, Turkish and Persian poetry.
- Risale-i Es'adiyye - Autobiography.
- Tevhid Risalesi Tercümesi - A commentary on Ibn Arabi's Kitab al-Tawhid.
- Fatiha-i Şerife Tercümesi - A tafsir (exegesis) on the first chapter of the Qur'an.
