= Esat Bicurri =

Kosovar singer

Esat Bicurri was a Kosovo Albanian singer of popular music. He was executed by Serbian forces during the Kosovo War in 1999. His corpse was found and reburied in 2004.

The Ministry of Culture of Kosovo charted the creation of a National Prize named after Esat Bicurri for excellence in music and popular urban music.
