= Surname-i Hümayun =

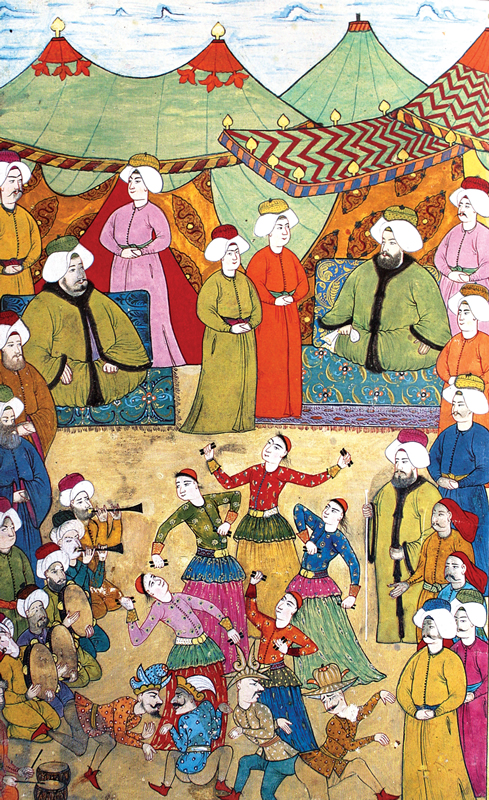
Depiction of musicians and dancers entertaining the crowd, found in the Surname, the manuscript of 1720.

The Surname-i Hümayun (Ottoman Turkish and Persian: سورنامه همایون, romanized: Imperial Festival Books) were albums that commemorated celebrations in the Ottoman Empire in pictorial and textual detail. Such celebrations included mainly imperial weddings and circumcision festivals. These albums were commissioned by the Ottoman Imperial family, usually by the Sultan presiding at the time. The Surnames recount the festivities in order of when the events took place, which includes processions, grand entrances of the Sultan, feasts, entertainers, musicians, dancers, gift giving, firework displays, circumcision and wedding ceremonies. Although many of the Surnames were made to celebrate circumcisions of Ottoman princes, the first Surname was commissioned in 1524 for a wedding ceremony.

== Importance ==
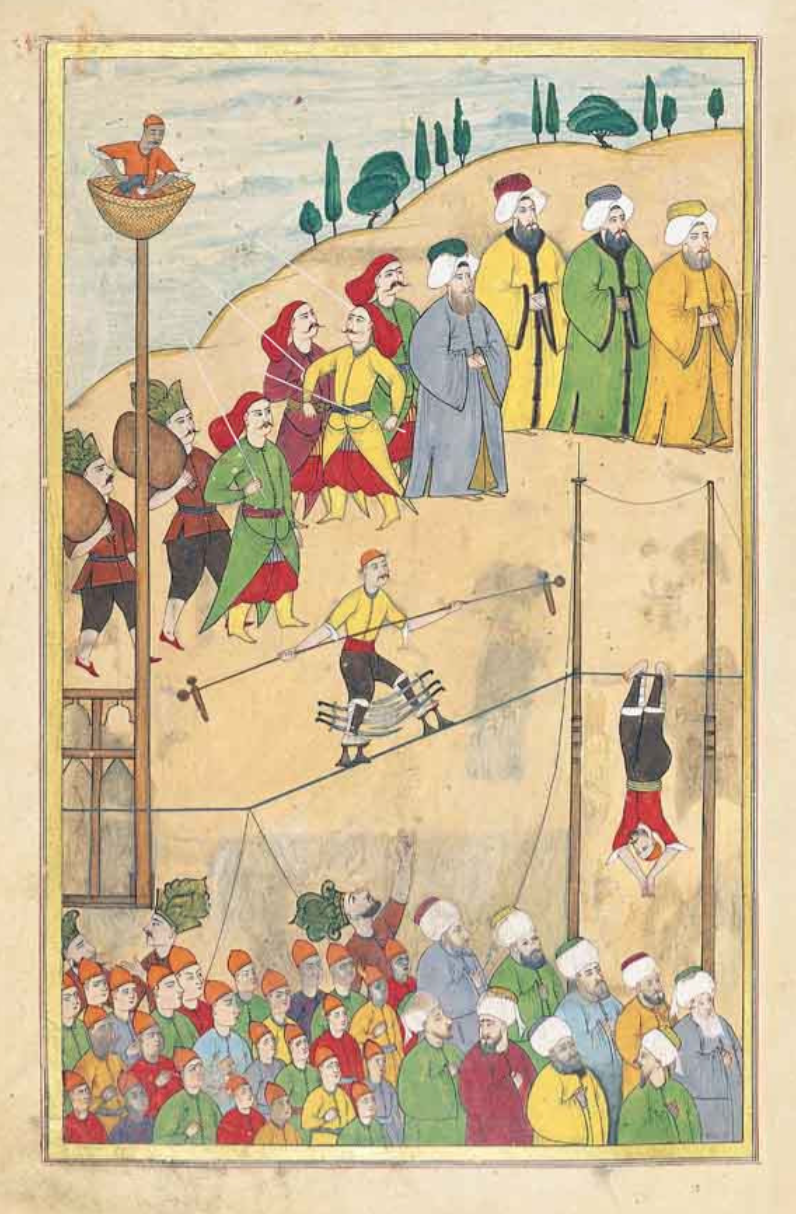
Acrobats during celebrations

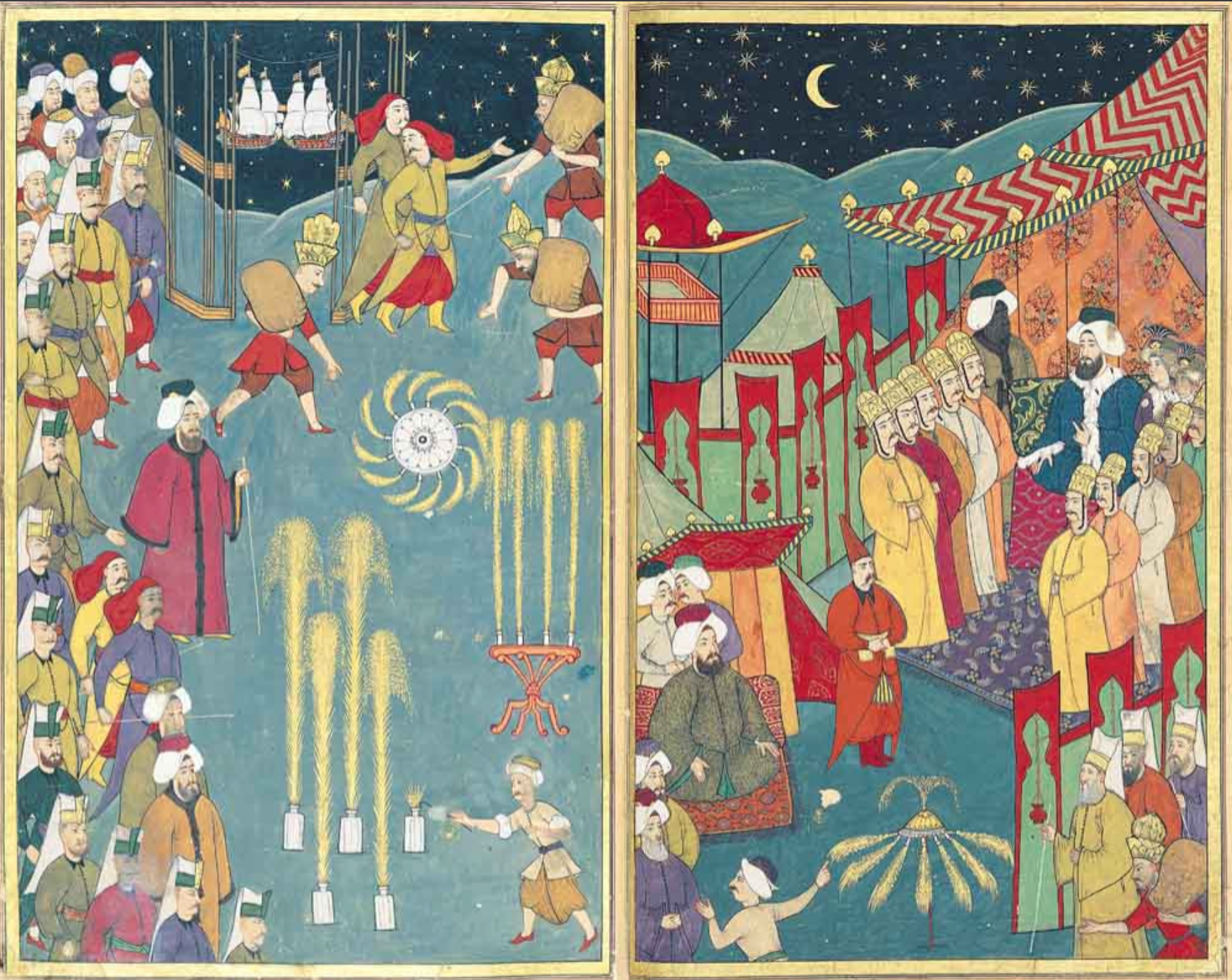
Use of fireworks during the celebrations

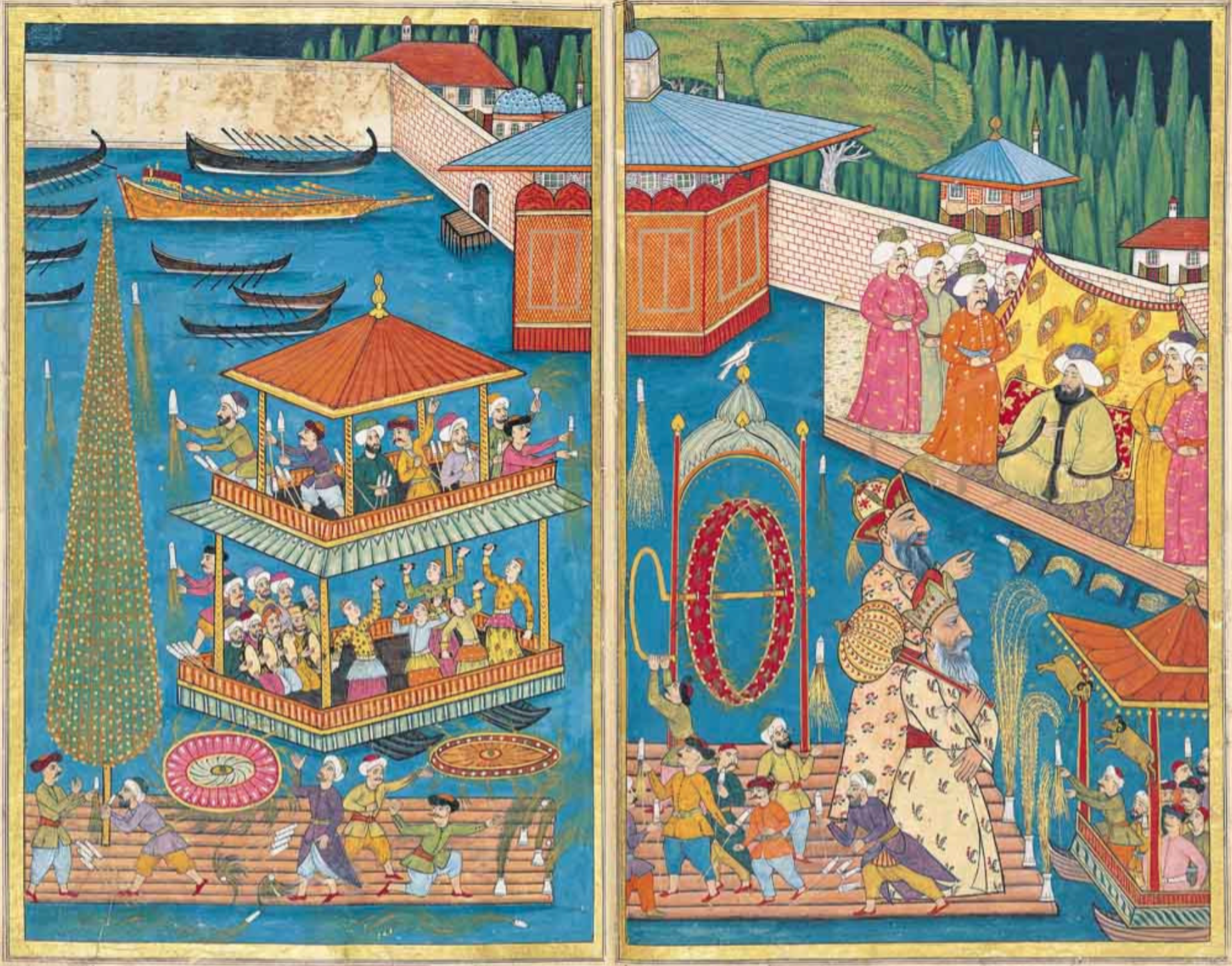
Ships of parade

Many reasons contributed to the formulation of these festival albums. Firstly, by commissioning the albums to be created in celebration of certain processions, it displayed the grandeur of the event. Colourful paintings that filled the pages of the album demonstrated the extravagance of the processions and the high costs. No expense was spared in these celebrations, and the making of the festival books. The Ottoman Sultans also wanted the memory of their son's circumcisions or daughters weddings to live on, beyond the event itself. The albums would allow for the future generations to experience the celebrations. The processions also involved many factions of society taking part and in effect, helped create a sense of unity or community. This aided in the Sultan's efforts to maintain popular support for him and the Ottoman Empire.

The Surnames would often gloss over unwanted and unappealing events, in order to maintain a more suitable image. The albums help create a positive image to show the power of the Sultan and the state. Since it was the Imperial family who put these festivals on, maintaining popular support and consolidating power was important to them because they were not voted into power but rather, passed down to them. The entire festival and in the Surname itself, conveyed a message that state mechanisms created order in a naturally chaotic world. Another motivation behind the creation of these albums was the reputation the Sultans wanted to maintain outside of the Empire. Impressing foreign diplomats who were on hand to witness the festivities was important because the diplomats would report back to their rulers in Europe. They reported not just on current state of affairs in the Ottoman Empire, but the great events and spectacles.

== Processions ==
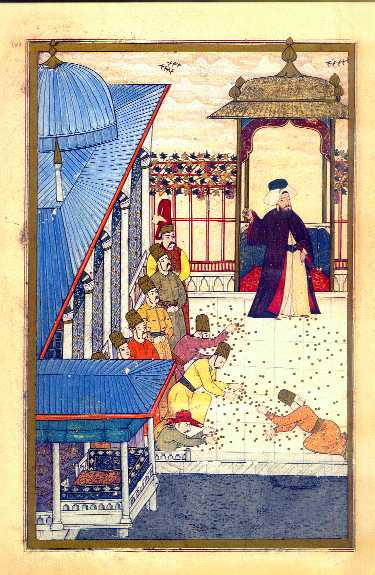
During the various festivals, the Ottoman Sultan would throw gold coins into the crowd as a sign of the great wealth of the imperial household.

There were many festivals and rituals that took place in the Ottoman Empire but only the most elaborate were documented in a Surname-I Hümayun. These are the festivals that are known to be documented in detail.

- 1524 The earliest known festival for which a Surname existed was created for the marriage of Princess Hatice, the sister of Süleyman I, to Grand Vizier Ibrahim Pasha. It was commissioned by Sultan Süleyman the Magnificent in order to have records of the event.
- 1530 Süleyman the Magnificent commissioned this festival in 1530 and it lasted three weeks. He decided to have a festival at this time, because even though his armies had failed to take Vienna, they had not been defeated and had to withdraw so the festival was used as a political strategy.
- 1582 This Surname-I Hümayun was commissioned for a circumcision festival, as well it was to commemorate Sultan Murad III’s son Prince Mehmed. This festival lasted fifty-two days and was probably one of the most elaborate and grandiose festival the Ottomans had ever held, and it was well documented. The organization of this Surname was done chronologically, each day documented in order with what occurred. The book was created by an author named ‘Intizami’ which is a pen-name, and the illustrations were done mainly by court artists including Nakkaş Osman.
- 1720 The Surname-I Hümayun of 1720 was commissioned by Sultan Ahmed III for the circumcision of his four sons, this festival lasted fifteen days. It was documented by Vehbi, who provided the text for the book. The illustrations were made by Levni and his assistants. This was the last festival documented in a Surname and it was also the last of its kind in terms of grandeur. Vehbi also points out in the Surname that he was chosen to create this festival book by winning a competition.

== Gallery ==
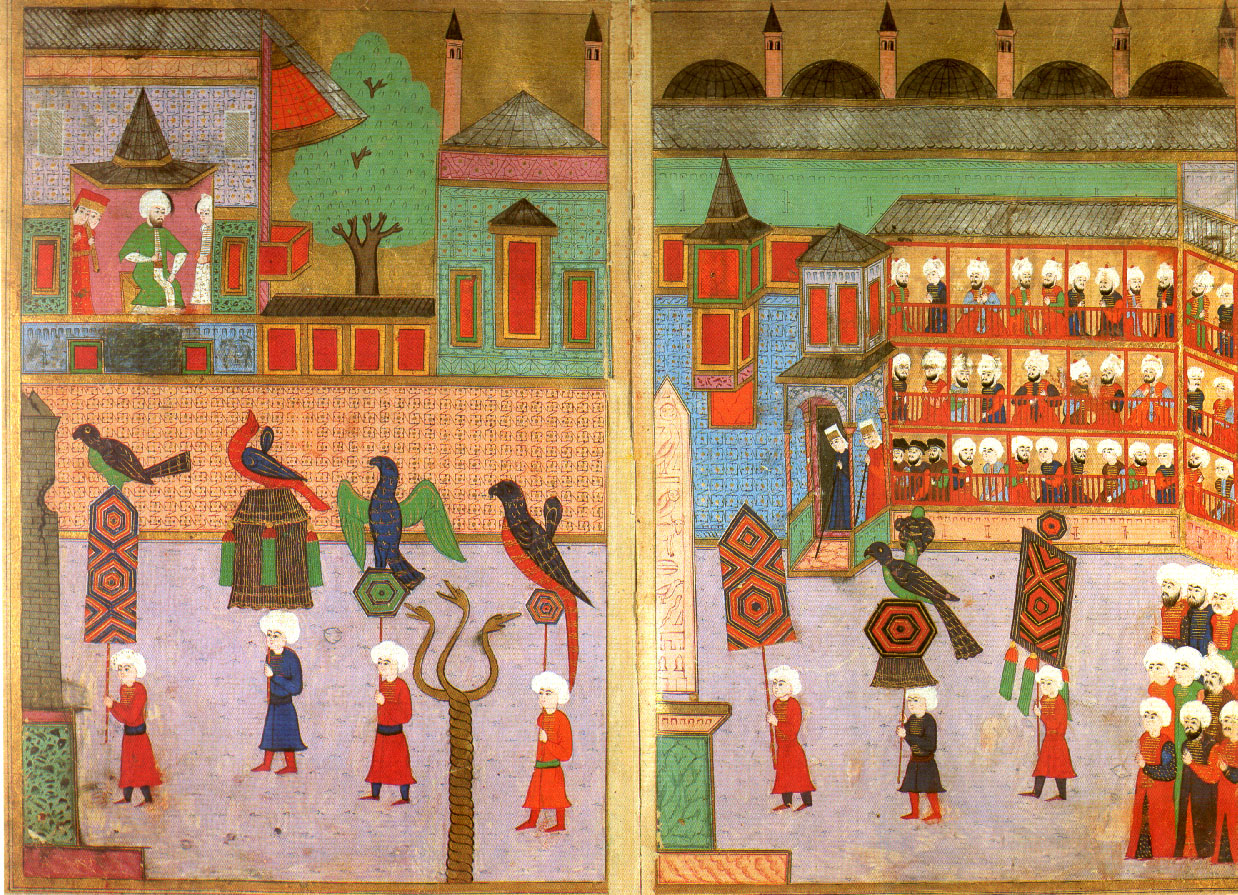

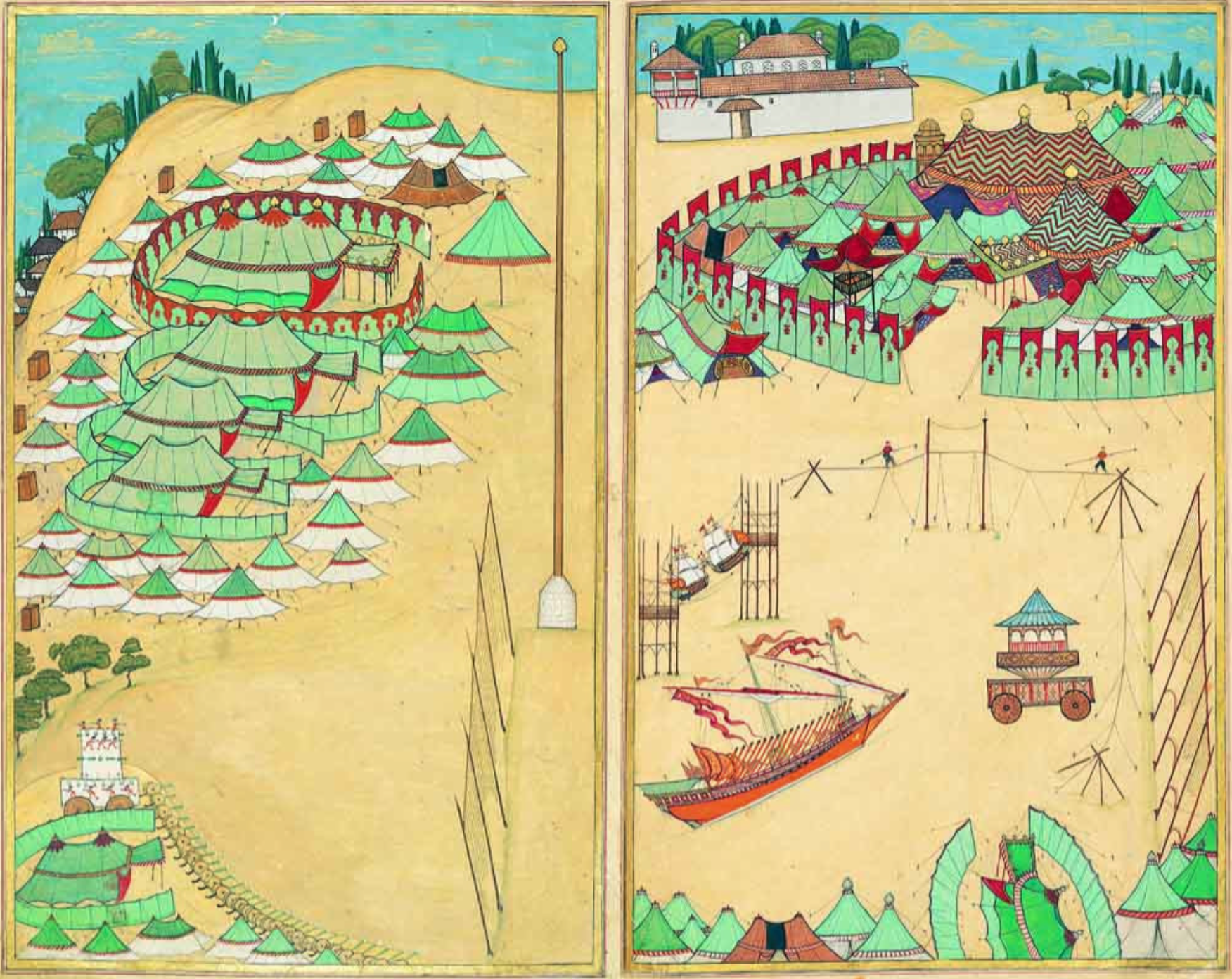

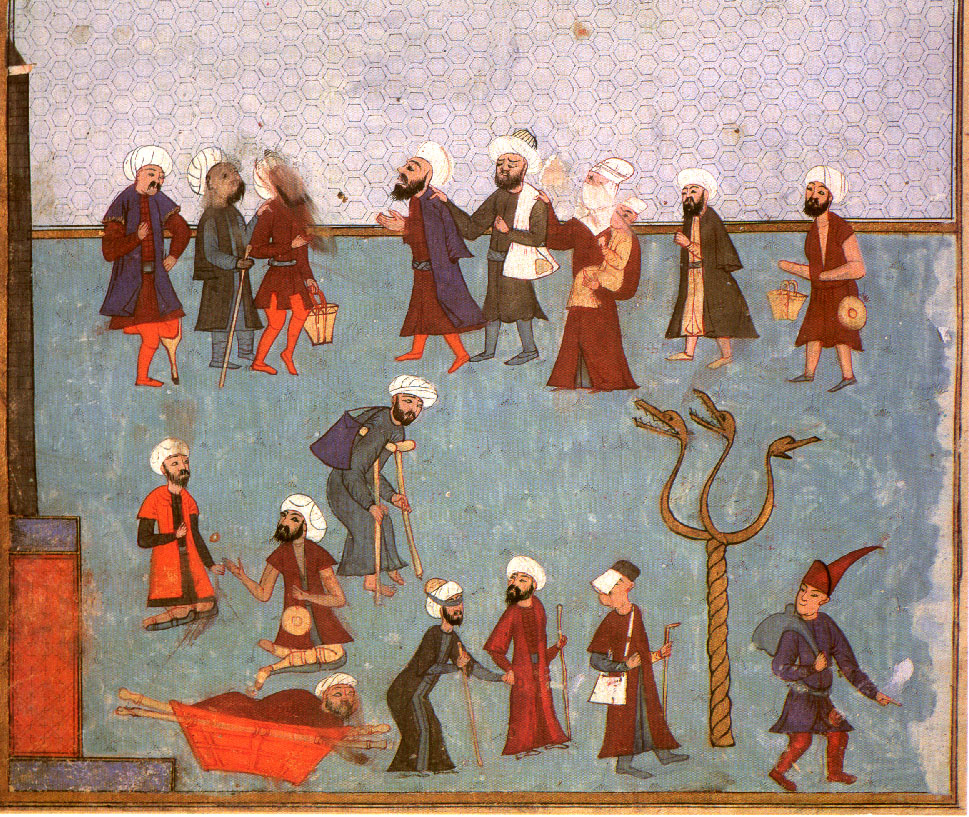

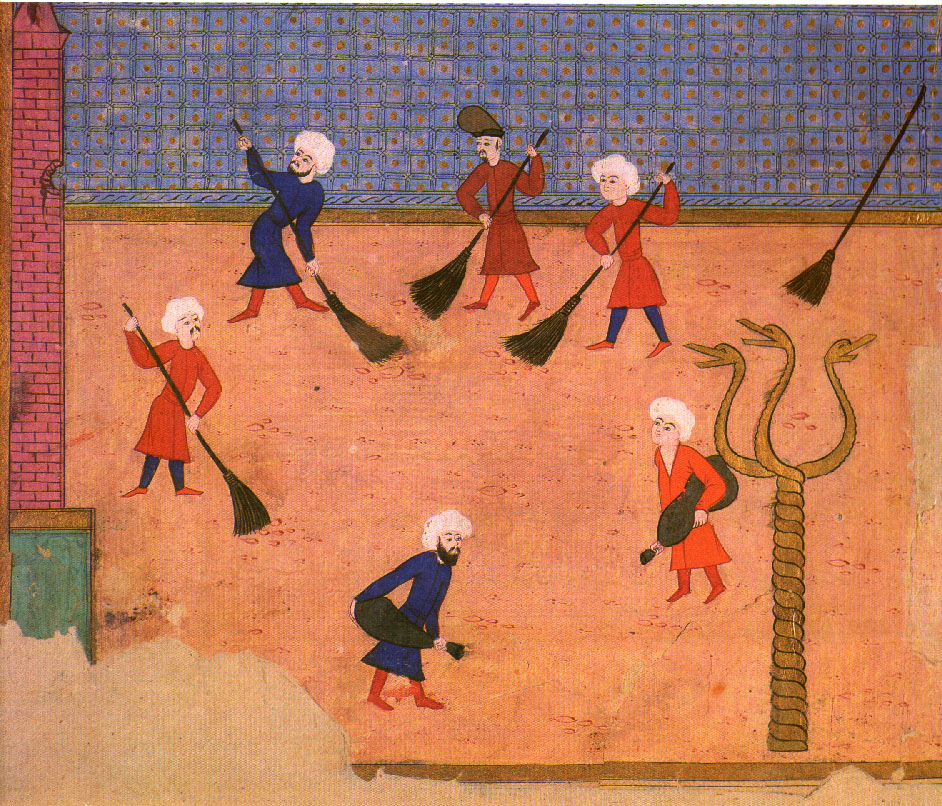

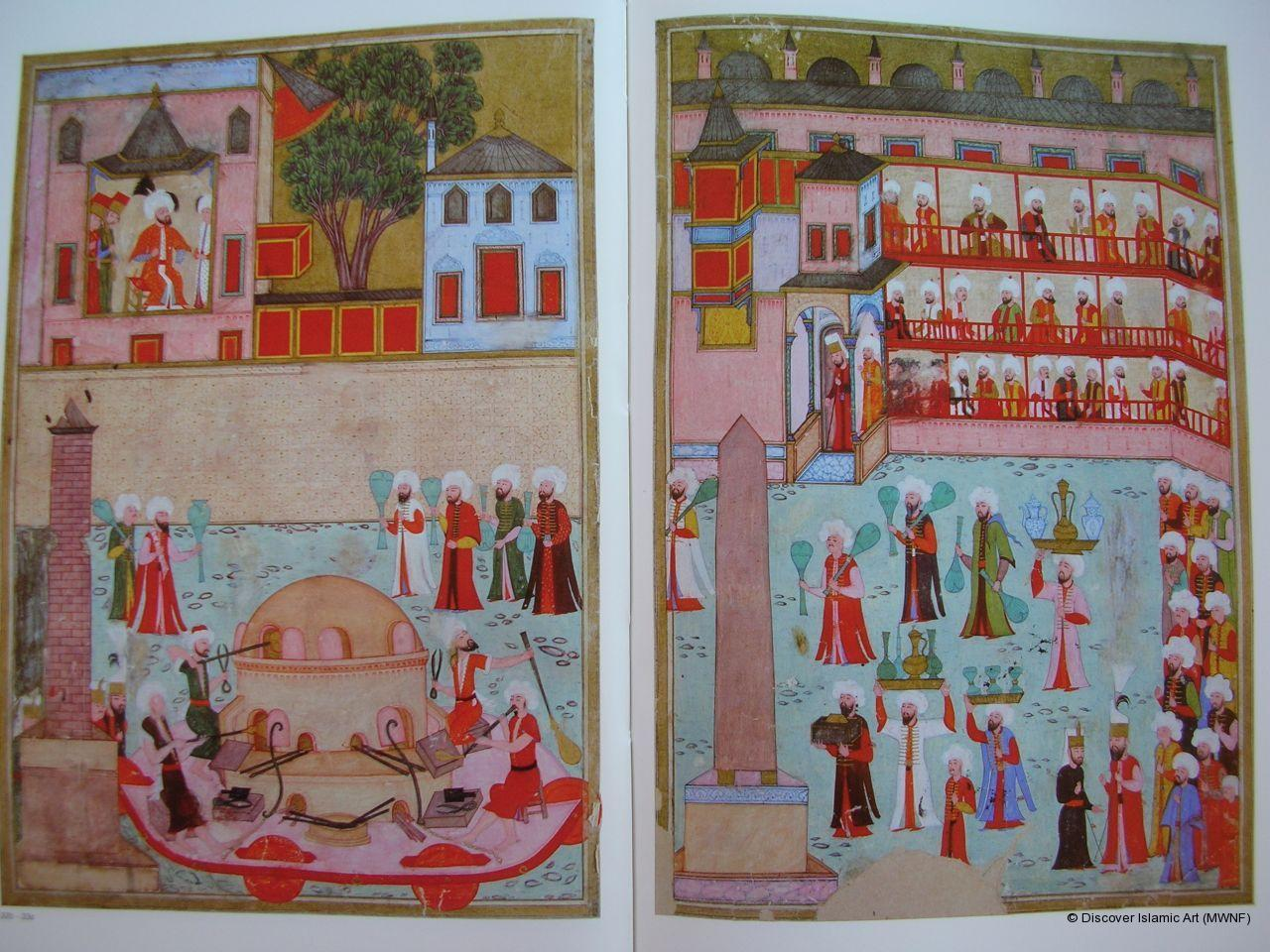

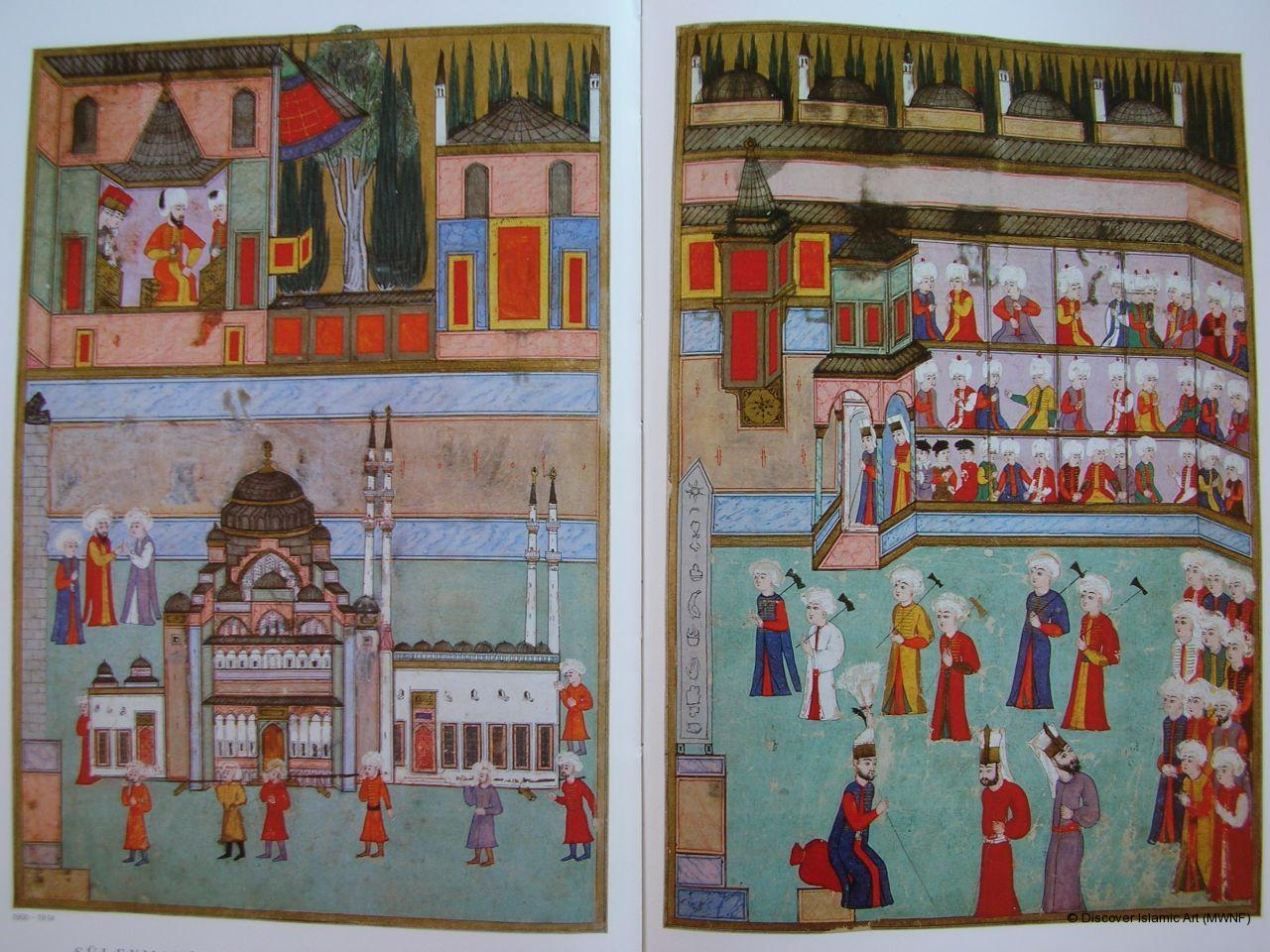

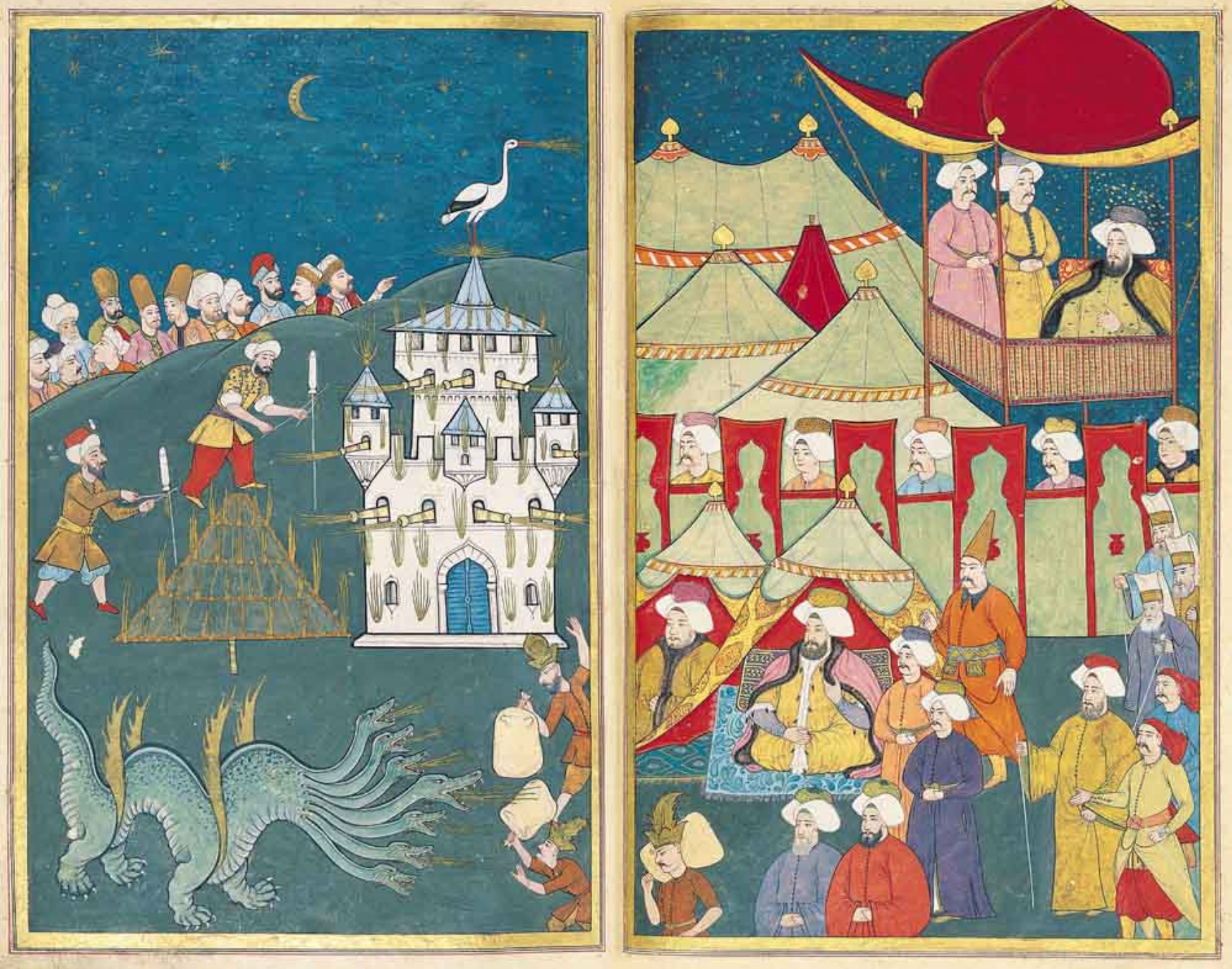

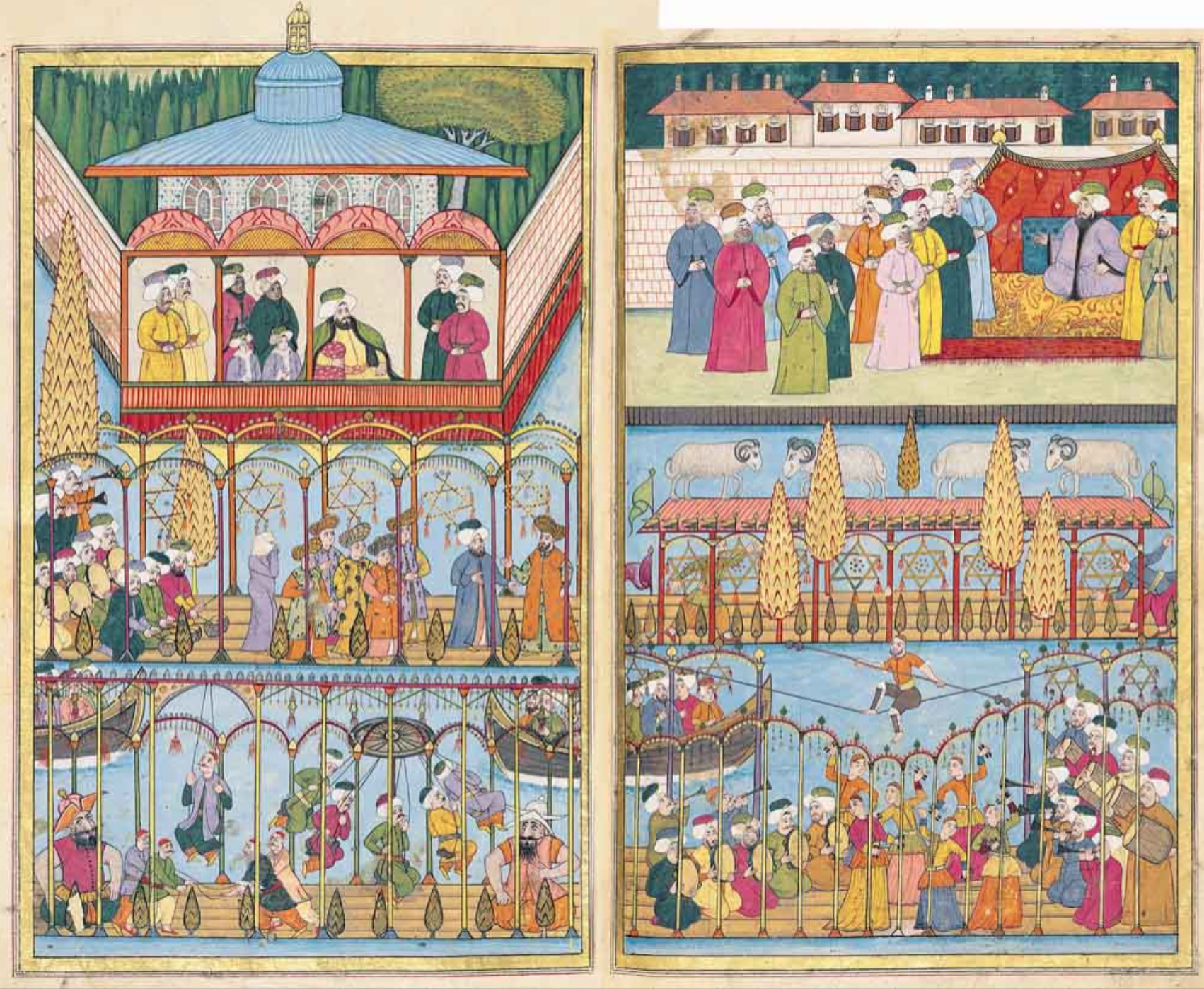

== Guilds and other groups ==
Guilds from many different professions would take part in the processions that occurred over the course of the festival. Artisan processions were not introduced into these festivals until 1582 and with the incorporation of an elaborate guild structure emerging in the seventeenth century, it became even more entrenched. The next two processions after that were limited strictly to guilds participating in processions. All the guilds that participated and created their own processions were depicted through miniatures in the Surname. A variety of guilds and groups were depicted in the Surnames.

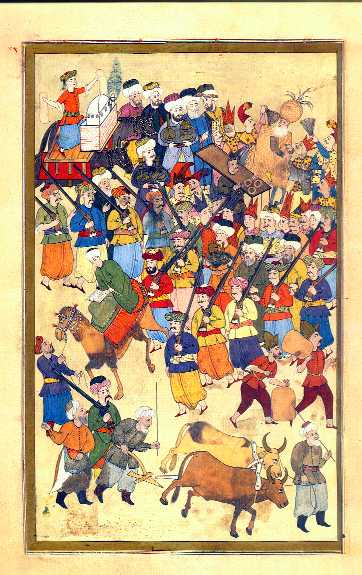
The various guilds found in the Ottoman take part in the festivals, often through parades and processions.

Among these groups were the coffee sellers, they were a prominent group in the 1582 festival. Coffee shops were a new phenomenon in the Ottoman Empire and some were branded with a negative image. This was changed when the coffee sellers paraded a model of a coffeehouse on wheels with customers inside. The Sultan was so pleased with the procession that he promised to be more lenient with them, at least for the time being.

Different artisan groups such as coppersmiths, goldsmiths and tailors would have their own processions. The master of the guild would usually be at the front accompanied by many apprentices and they would have their work on display. Just as the coffee sellers, these groups would also carry recreations of their workshops built on wheels. They were usually accompanied by hundreds of young men who were typically apprentices and they were adorned with gold and many other jewels. The Surname describes these young men in detail; the descriptions are given a lot of space in the Surname and praise their beauty almost as if they were a source of excitement for the spectators.

Guilds were not the only groups to participate in the festivals and they too were well-documented in the Surname. There were also the market inspectors (muhtesibs) who displayed themselves by inspecting the crowd, shopkeepers and artisans, as they would do on a regular basis. There were interactions between the crowd and the tulumcus, where there would be security present to keep the crowds in check. Even though they were officially supposed to make sure the crowd did not get out of hand, the Surname depicts them as buffoon-like figures that would joke with the crowds, imitate the dancers etc.

Although students were not officially a part of a procession, they also found their own unique way to participate. Two thousand students of lower religious studies would come from the countryside and participated mainly to show the Sultan the poverty they were living in. One day they put on their own performance, and on another day they prayed and left. They could have disrupted the festivities, but observed proper behaviour throughout their stay.

== See also ==
- Topkapı Palace
- Ottoman miniature

== Notes ==
=== References ===
- Terzioğlu, Derin (1995). "The imperial circumcision festival of 1582: an interpretation". Muqarnas. 12: 84–100. JSTOR 1523225.
- Stout, Robert E. (1966). The Sur-i Humayun of Murad III: a Study of Ottoman Pageantry and Entertainment (Ph.D. thesis). Ohio State University.
- Yerasimos, Stephane. "The Imperial Procession: Recreating a World's Order". Archived from the original on October 25, 2009.
