= Dautović =

Dautović may refer to:

- Dženan Dautović (born 1980), Bosnian historian
- Emir Dautović (born 1995), Slovenian footballer
