= Esad Komić =

Yugoslav footballer (1944–2022)

Personal information
- Full name: Esad Komić
- Date of birth: 29 February 1944
- Place of birth: Bosanska Krupa, SFR Yugoslavia
- Date of death: 31 August 2022 (aged 78)
- Place of death: Salt Lake City, USA
- Position: Goalkeeper

Senior career*
Years	Team	Apps	(Gls)
- Bratstvo
- Borac Banja Luka
- Šibenik
- Olympique de Marseille
- * Club domestic league appearances and goals

Esad Komić (29 February 1944 – 31 August 2022) was a Yugoslav footballer.

He played for Bratstvo, FK Borac Banja Luka, and HNK Šibenik, in Yugoslavia, and Olympique de Marseille, France.

He lived in the Salt Lake City, Utah, USA and died there 31 August 2022.
