= Rasadnik Hall =

Sports venue in Skopje, North Macedonia

Rasadnik
- Hot Court
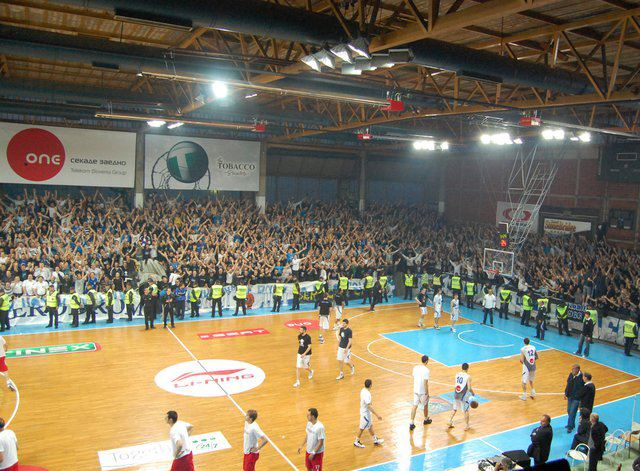
- Location: Kisela Voda
- Owner: Skopje City
- Capacity: 1000

Construction
- Opened: 1983

Tenant
- HC Tinex / HC Vardar / WHC Vardar

Rasadnik Hall in Skopje is a multi-functional indoor sports arena. It is located in the Municipality of Kisela Voda, Skopje. It has a maximum seating capacity of 1.000-1.500. In the past it was used by RK Tineks Prolet. The arena is currently used by RK Vardar.

== Project ==
Faculty of Architecture Skopje / Institute for Studies and Design "BETON" – Skopje

Author: Mihajlo Volkanov

Participants in the design/collaborators: Goce Adji-Mitrevski, Mirce Kokaleski, Dominika Boshkova, Gjorgevic Ljubisa, Simeon Tanev, Lenka Janeva, Cvetanka Mechalova

Year of design: 1978 / 79

Year of construction: 1970 / 83

Contractor: GRO "Granit" – Skopje

Investor: City Assembly of Skopje (self-contribution) from the budget.

Awards: First prize at a public architectural competition (1978), Special award at the 1st Biennial of Macedonian Architecture (1981) for a design study.
