= Daut =

Daut is a given name. Notable people with the name include:

- Daut Boriçi (1825–1896), Albanian alim, müderris and nationalist figure
- Daut Demaku (born 1944), Albanian writer and lecturer
- Daut Haradinaj (born 1978), Kosovo Albanian politician
- Daut Musekwa (born 1988), Zambian footballer

== See also ==
- Daut (surname)
