= Esad Drpljanin =

Macedonian professional handball player

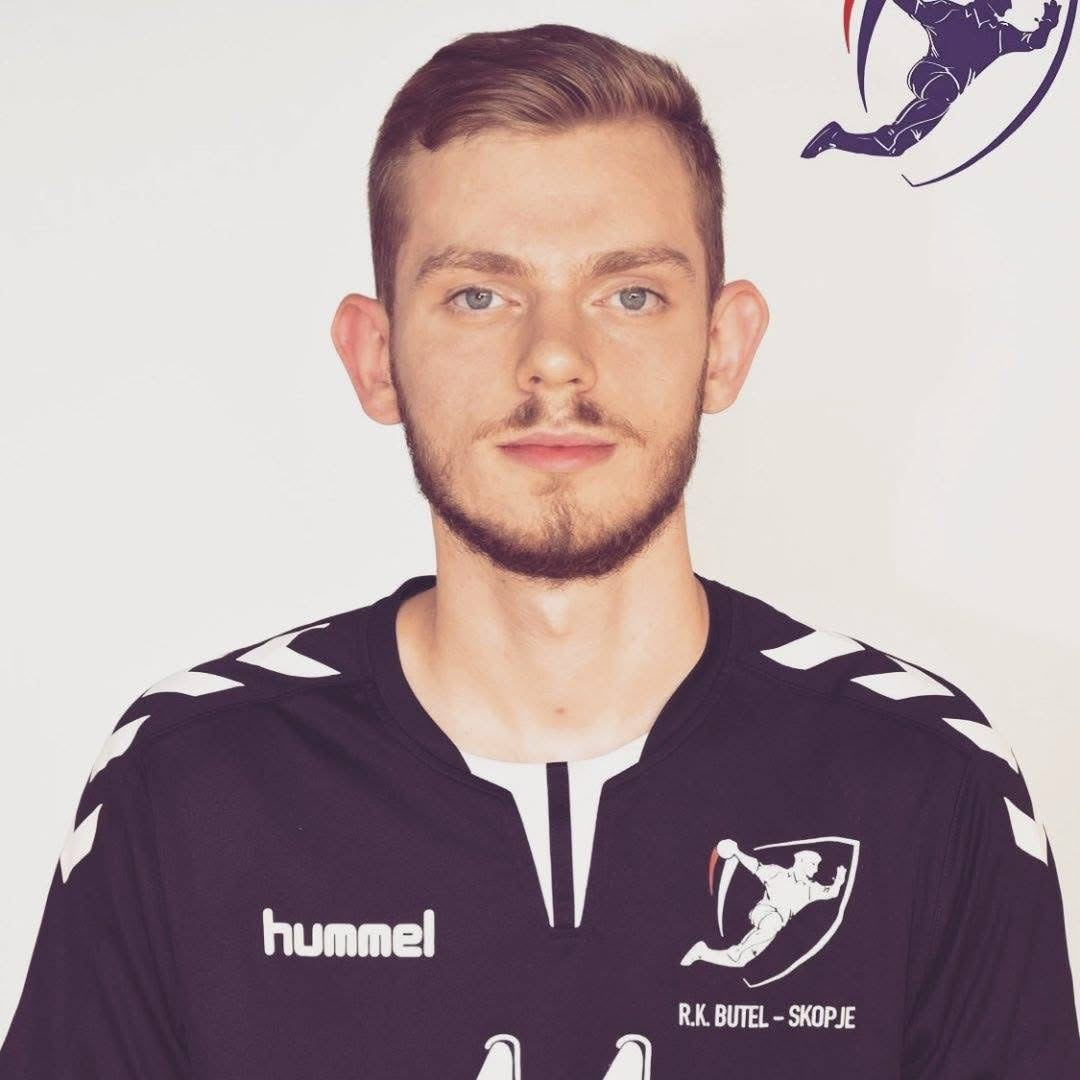

Personal information
- Nationality: Macedonian
- Born: December 18, 2001 (age 24) Skopje, North Macedonia
- Height: 188 cm (74 in)
- Weight: 80 kg (176 lb)

Sport
- Sport: Handball
- Position: Left wing
- Current club: (North Macedonia) RK Prolet 62

Senior clubs
- Years: Team
- 2018–2021: (North Macedonia) HC Butel Skopje
- 2021–2024: (North Macedonia) RK Golden Art
- 2025–: (North Macedonia) RK Prolet 62

Esad Drpljanin (born 18 December 2001) is a Macedonian professional handball player who plays as a left wing for RK Prolet 62. He began his senior career with RK Butel Skopje, later played for Golden Art, and in 2025 joined RK Prolet 62.

== Career ==
Drpljanin started his professional handball career in 2018 with RK Butel Skopje, competing in the Macedonian Super League and European competitions.

From 2021 to 2024, he played for Golden Art. In 2025, he joined RK Prolet 62.

== Playing style ==
Drpljanin is known for his speed, sharp counterattacks, strong defense, and precise finishing from the left wing, marked by agility and quick transitions.
