= Esad Dauti =

Kosovan educationalist and politician (1937–2020)

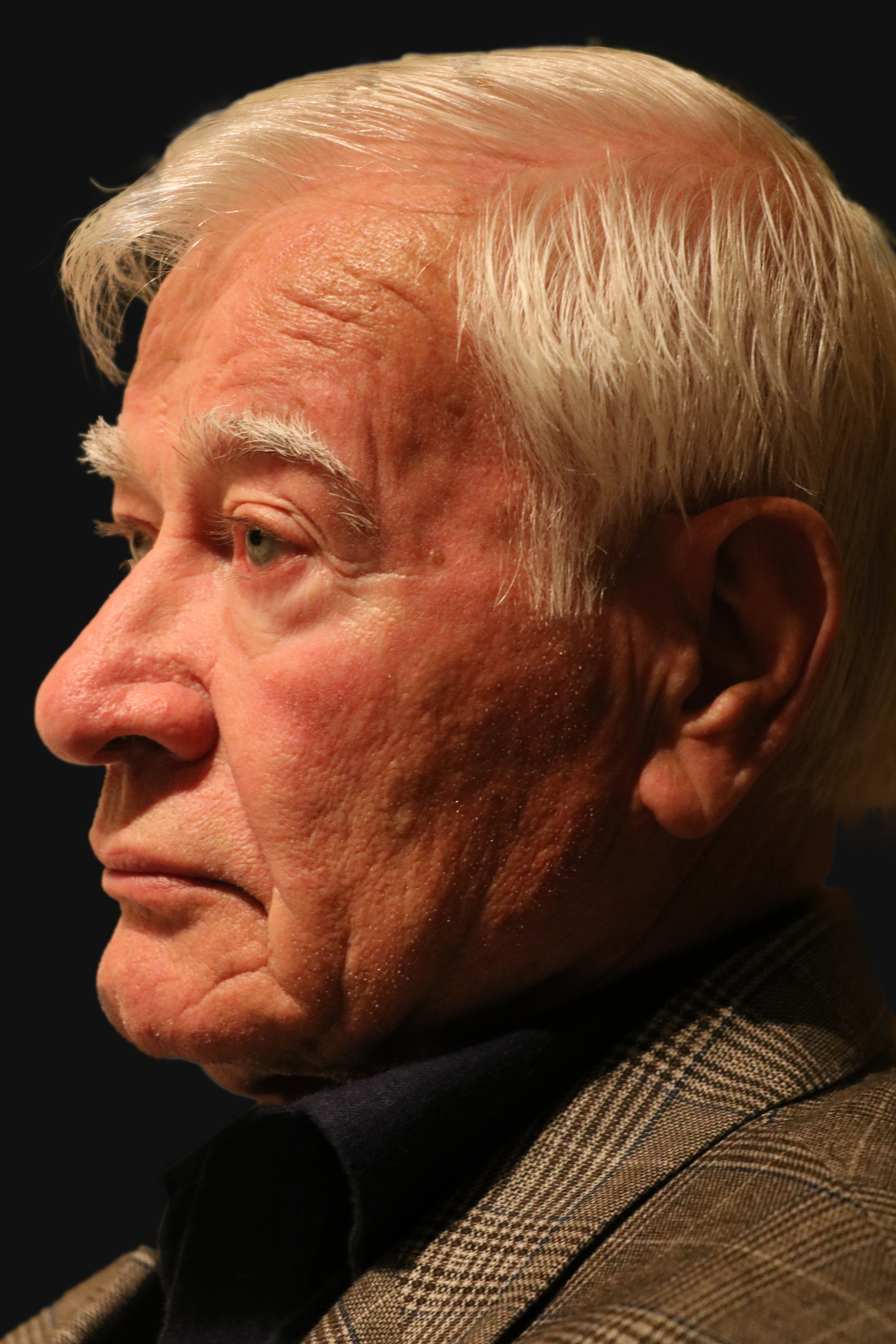
Esad Dauti aged 82

Esad Dauti (1937 – 2020) was an educationalist, member of parliament, environmentalist and entomologist. He was a co-founder of the Green Movement of Kosovo in 1990 and was three times member of parliament: in the Assembly of Kosovo in 1972, in the Assembly of the Republic of Kosovo in 1996 and in 2001 (as a member of the Democratic League of Kosovo which he helped found).

As a university professor, he worked from 1974 in the Faculty of Natural and Mathematical Sciences at the University of Pristina. He was Dean of faculty and head of the general council of the university. His speciality was zoo-ecology and zoogeography. He had many graduate students and he also lectured in different universities on these subjects.

He went to primary school in Peja and completed his secondary education at the Gymnasium in 1954-55. He studied teaching in Skopje, specialising in biology and chemistry, in 1956, and also taught in a primary school in Liria. After secondary school he had been given a place to study economics in Belgrade but just as he was about to travel there, the police stopped him and took him from the train and told him he was forbidden further studies, but was to teach at a village school in Peja. This was because his father had been declared an enemy of the Yugoslav state. He worked first in the high school in Ferizaj and in 1970-71 as a teacher in a high school in Gjakova where he lectured in zoology. He completed his university degree in 1969 at the University of Skopje in the faculty of natural sciences, specialising in biology. In 1973 he began to lecture at the University of Pristina as an assistant in the area of zoology and zoogeography.

In 1977 he completed a master’s degree at the University of Zagreb in ecology and animal categorisation; he followed this with a PhD in ecology in 1981 in Zagreb. He later undertook a further specialty as a Fulbright scholar in West Berlin, Vienna and Leipzig, in entomology.
