= Ümmügülsüm Sultan (daughter of Ahmed III) =

Ottoman princess, daughter of Ahmed III

- Born: 11 February 1708; Topkapı Palace, Constantinople, Ottoman Empire
- Died: 28 November 1732 (aged 24); Constantinople, Ottoman Empire
- Burial: New Mosque, Istanbul
- Spouse: Genç Ali Pasha (m. 1724; died 1730)
- Issue: Sultanzade Mustafa Bey; Sultanzade Mehmed Bey; Sultanzade Hafız Bey; Sultanzade Hacı Bey; Fülane Hanımsultan
- Dynasty: Ottoman
- Father: Ahmed III
- Religion: Sunni Islam

Ümmügülsüm Sultan (Ottoman Turkish: ام کلثوم سلطان; 11 February 1708 – 28 November 1732) was an Ottoman princess, daughter of Sultan Ahmed III.

== Early life ==
Ümmügülsüm Sultan was born on 11 February 1708 in the Topkapı Palace. She had a twin sister Zeynep Sultan, who died on 5 November 1708. In 1710 at the age of about two, she was engaged to the elderly Abdurrahman Pasha, a vizier. It was an expensive affair for the pasha. He sent to Topkapı a great number of valuable engagement presents. The engagement cost Abdurrahman more than 10,000 gold coins. However, he died in 1715 before the marriage could take place.

== Marriage ==
In 1724, her father arranged her marriage to Genç Ali Pasha, nephew of Grand Nevşehirli Damat Ibrahim Pasha. The first of the processions on 21 February 1724, on the occasion of the transfer of the betrothal gifts of Ali Bey from the grand vezir's palace to the Topkapı Palace, was led by the Grand Admiral Kaymak Mustafa Pasha. The grand admiral was the best man of Ali Pasha. Her half-sisters Hatice Sultan and Atike Sultan were also married on the same day.

The procession, comprising the high-ranking members of the two best men's retinues, and a crowd of elite guards chosen from the private entourage of the grand vezir, entered the palace from the Imperial Gate, and a series of rituals took place in the palace. The sultan's gifts to Ali Pasha were received, and the marriage contract were signed on 20 February. Eight days later, on 28 February 1724, the trousseau of the princess was transferred from the Topkapı Palace to her palace at Kadırga Limanı.

On Thursday, 2 March 1724, Ümmügülsüm was taken from the Topkapı Palace and transported to the Kadırga Palace which was assigned to her. This final procession included the sultan, the grand vizier and their households, as well as members of the ulema; various formalities were observed along the way, such as an elaborate acclamation in front of Alay Köşkü.

Ümmügülsüm's wedding celebration rivaled that of her sister Fatma Sultan. Yet her life was a troubled one. She and her husband soon found themselves in financial straits, and she appealed to her father for help.

Ümmügülsüm was widowed in 1730, at 22, when her husband was killed in the Patrona Halil Rebellion and her father was dethroned.

== Charity ==
In 1728, her father commissioned a fountain in her name in Rum Mehmed Pasha neighborhood.

== Death ==
The Patrona Halil rebellion against her father ended whatever good days Ümmügülsüm may have had, and on 28 November 1732, at the age of twenty four, she died. She is buried in the New Mosque, Istanbul.

== Issue ==
By her marriage, Ümmügülsüm Sultan had four sons and one daughter:

- Sultanzade Mustafa Bey
- Sultanzade Mehmed Bey
- Sultanzade Hafız Bey
- Sultanzade Hacı Bey
- Fülane Hanımsultan

== See also ==
- List of Ottoman princesses

== Sources ==
- Davis, Fanny (1986). The Ottoman Lady: A Social History from 1718 to 1918. Greenwood Publishing Group. ISBN 978-0-313-24811-5.
- Duindam, Jeroen; Artan, Tülay; Kunt, Metin (August 11, 2011). Royal Courts in Dynastic States and Empires: A Global Perspective. BRILL. ISBN 978-9-004-20622-9.
- Sakaoğlu, Necdet (2008). Bu mülkün kadın sultanları: Vâlide sultanlar, hâtunlar, hasekiler, kadınefendiler, sultanefendiler. Oğlak Yayıncılık. pp. 613–18. ISBN 978-9-753-29623-6.
- Uluçay, Mustafa Çağatay (2011). Padişahların kadınları ve kızları. Ankara: Ötüken. ISBN 978-9-754-37840-5.
