= Şehzade Mehmed (son of Ahmed III) =

Ottoman prince (1717–1756)

Şehzade Mehmed شہزادہ محمد
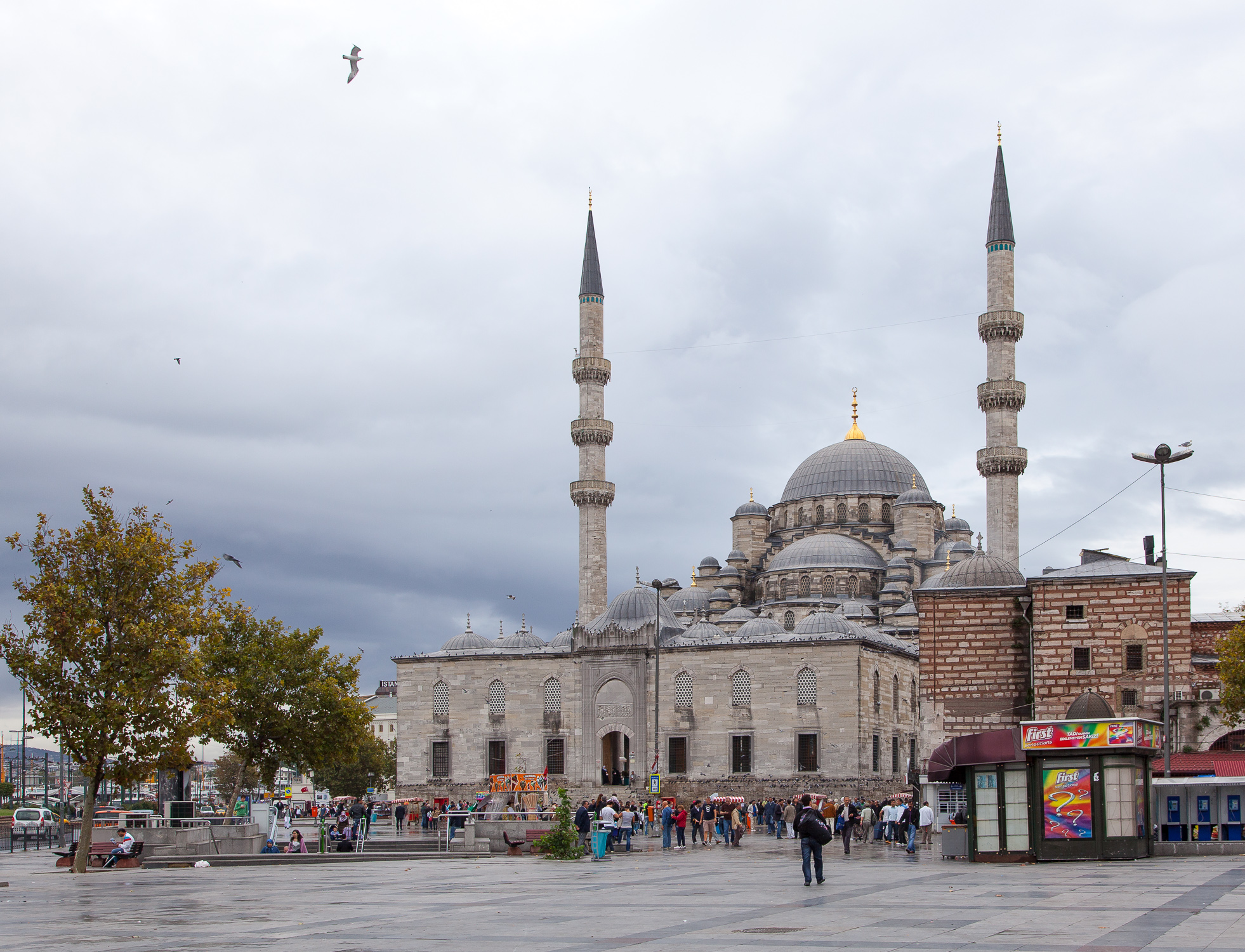
- The sarcophagus of Şehzade Mehmed is located inside the Turhan Hatice Sultan Mausoleum at New Mosque at Eminönü in Istanbul.
- Born: 2 January 1717; Topkapi Palace, Constantinople, Ottoman Empire (modern-day Istanbul, Turkey)
- Died: 2 January 1756 (aged 39); Constantinople, Ottoman Empire (modern-day Istanbul, Turkey)
- Burial: Turhan Hatice Sultan Mausoleum, Istanbul
- Dynasty: Ottoman
- Father: Ahmed III
- Mother: Rukiye Kadın
- Religion: Islam

Şehzade Mehmed (Ottoman Turkish: شہزادہ محمد; 2 January 1717 – 2 January 1756) was the son of Ottoman Sultan Ahmed III (reign 1703–1730) and his consort Rukiye Kadın.

== Early life ==
Şehzade Mehmed was born on 2 January 1717 to Ahmed III and his consort Rukiye Kadın. He had a full-sister named Hatice Sultan seven years older than him.

Following his birth, his half-brother Mustafa (later Mustafa III) was born and the birth of both princes were celebrated in February 1717. Large volumes of food, sweets and clothes were provided to the people on the birth of the two princes. In 1720, an extensive fifteen-day circumcision ceremony took place for Mehmed and his brothers, princes Süleyman, Mustafa, and Bayezid. After his circumcision he was educated, and taught in the Topkapi Palace.

He was taught by his lala (teacher). He had mastered mathematics and geography. He spoke fluent Persian and English.

== Life in the Kafes ==
After his father's deposition, he lived mostly confined to Kafes. Mehmed went on campaigns along with his cousin Mahmud I. He met French ambassadors and also had good relations with the Admiral of the Fleet.

In 1743, he built a rest house in Manisa for travellers. He met the grand vizier and Şeyḫülislām.

== Death ==
Şehzade Mehmed died in the Kafes on 2 January 1756. He was buried inside the Mausoleum of Turhan Sultan in Istanbul, Turkey.

== Sources ==
- Aktaş, Ali (2008). ÇELEBİZÂDE ÂSIM TARİHİ: Transkripsiyonlu metin.
