= Hatice Sultan =

Hatice Sultan or Hadice Sultan may refer to the following:

- Hatice Sultan (daughter of Bayezid II), Ottoman princess
- Hatice Sultan (daughter of Selim I), Ottoman princess
- Hatice Sultan (daughter of Murad III), Ottoman princess
- Hatice Sultan (daughter of Mehmed III), Ottoman princess
- Hatice Sultan (daughter of Mehmed IV), Ottoman princess
- Hatice Sultan (daughter of Ahmed III), Ottoman princess
- Hatice Sultan (daughter of Mustafa III), Ottoman princess
- Hatice Sultan (daughter of Murad V), Ottoman princess
