= Ahmed III =

Sultan of the Ottoman Empire from 1703 to 1730

- Custodian of the Two Holy Mosques
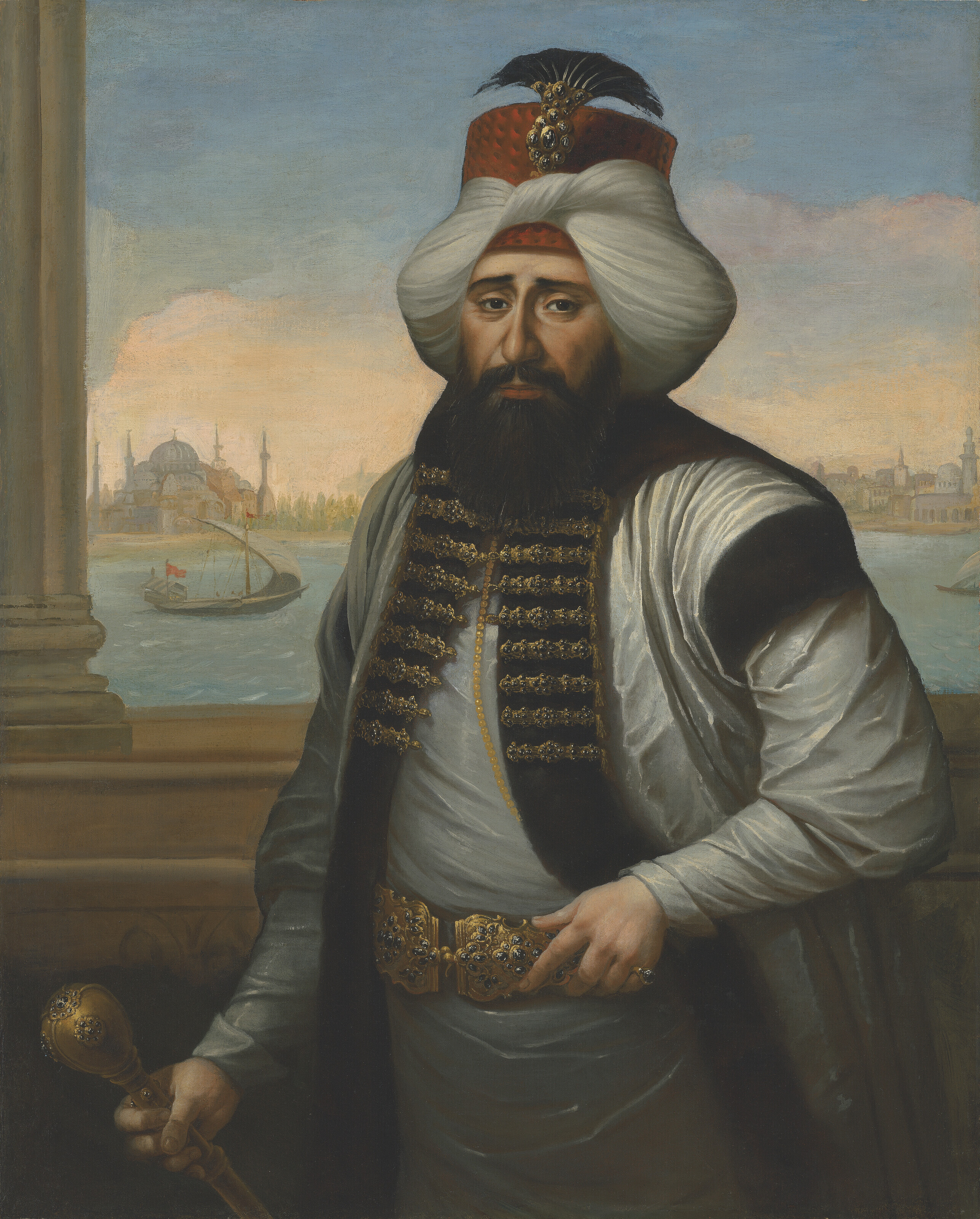
- Portrait by Jean Baptiste Vanmour

Sultan of the Ottoman Empire (Padishah)
- Reign: 22 August 1703 – 20 September 1730
- Predecessor: Mustafa II
- Successor: Mahmud I

Ottoman Caliph (Amir al-Mu'minin)
- Predecessor: Mustafa II
- Successor: Mahmud I
- Born: 30 December 1673; Hacıoğlu Pazarcık, Ottoman Empire
- Died: 1 July 1736 (aged 62); Constantinople, Ottoman Empire
- Burial: Tomb of Turhan Sultan, Istanbul, Turkey
- Consorts: Emetullah Kadın; Mihrişah Kadın; Rabia Şermi Kadın; Musli Kadın others
- Issue Among others: Fatma Sultan; Ümmügülsüm Sultan; Hatice Sultan; Atike Sultan; Zeynep Sultan; Saliha Sultan; Ayşe Sultan; Şehzade Mehmed; Mustafa III; Abdul Hamid I; Esma Sultan; Zübeyde Sultan
Names
- Ahmed bin Mehmed
- Dynasty: Ottoman
- Father: Mehmed IV
- Mother: Gülnuş Sultan
- Religion: Sunni Islam
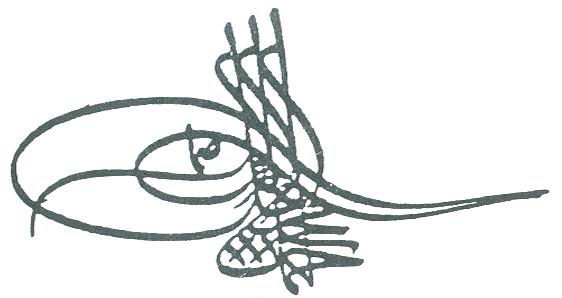
- Tughra

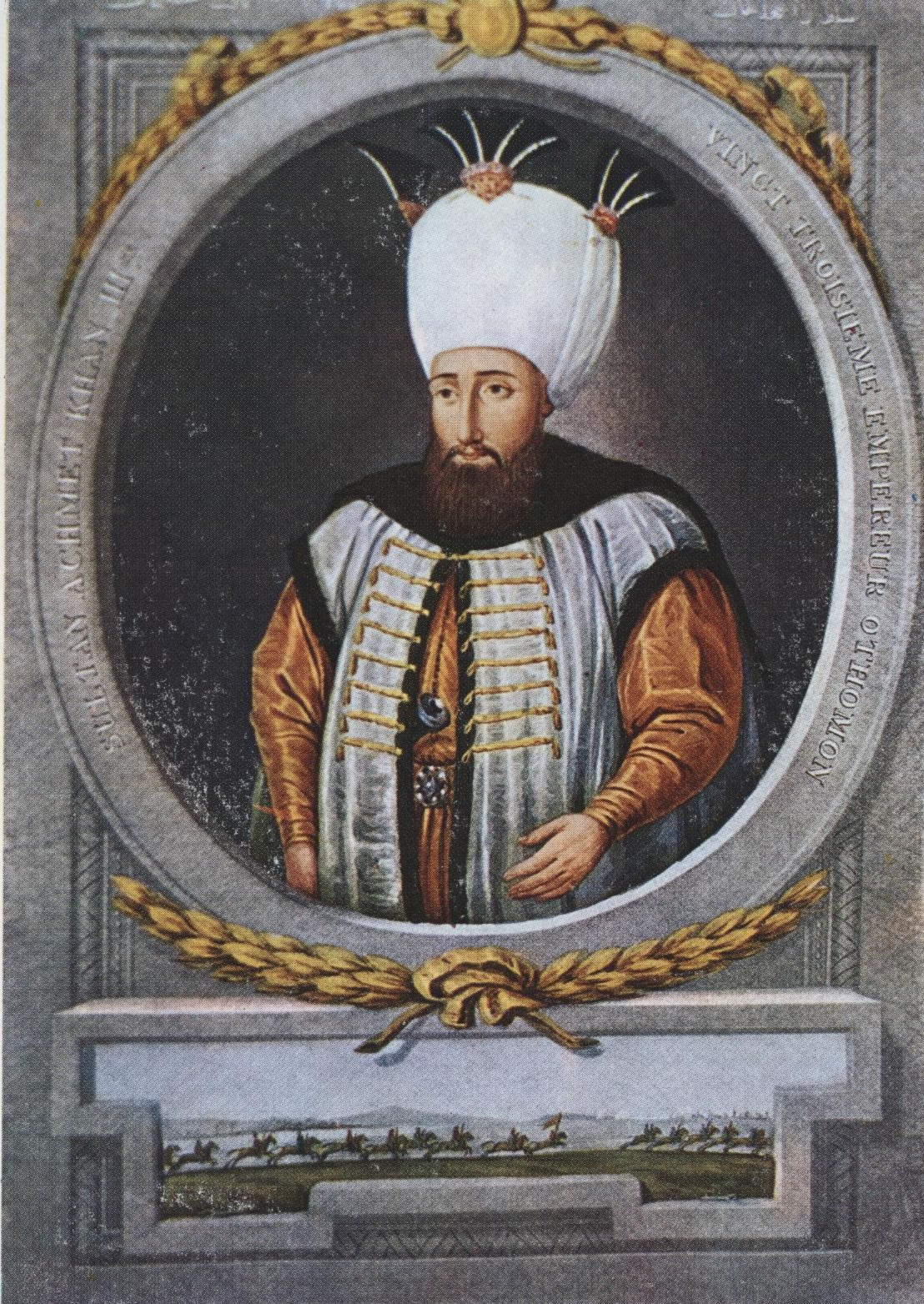
Sultan Ahmed III

Ahmed III (Ottoman Turkish: احمد ثالث, Aḥmed-i sālis; Turkish: III. Ahmed; 30 December 1673 – 1 July 1736) was sultan of the Ottoman Empire from 1703 to 1730. He was a son of sultan Mehmed IV (r. 1648–1687) and Gülnuş Sultan, originally named Evmania Voria, who was an ethnic Greek. He was born at Hacıoğlu Pazarcık, in Dobruja. He succeeded to the throne in 1703 on the abdication of his brother Mustafa II (1695–1703). Nevşehirli Damat İbrahim Pasha and the Sultan's daughter, Fatma Sultan (wife of the former) directed the government from 1718 to 1730, a period referred to as the Tulip Era.

During the initial days of Ahmed III's reign, significant efforts were made to appease the janissaries. However, Ahmed's effectiveness in dealing with the janissaries who had elevated him to the sultanate was limited. Grand Vizier Çorlulu Ali Pasha, whom Ahmed appointed, provided valuable assistance in administrative affairs and implemented new measures for the treasury. He supported Ahmed in his struggles against rival factions and provided stability to the government. Ahmed was an avid reader, skilled in calligraphy and knowledgeable on history and poetry.

== Early life and education ==
Sultan Ahmed was born on 30 December 1673. His father was Sultan Mehmed IV, and his mother was Gülnuş Sultan, originally named Evmania/Eugenie Voria. His birth occurred in Hacıoğlupazarı, where Mehmed stayed to hunt on his return from Poland in 1673, while Gülnuş was pregnant at that time. In 1675, he and his brother, Prince Mustafa (future Mustafa II) were circumcised. During the same ceremony their sisters Hatice Sultan and Fatma Emetullah Sultan were married to Musahip Mustafa Pasha and Kara Mustafa Pasha respectively. The celebrations lasted 20 days.

He grew up in the Edirne Palace. His schooling began during one of the sporadic visits of the court to Istanbul, following a courtly ceremony called bad-i basmala, which took place on 9 August 1679 in the Istavroz Palace. He was brought up in the imperial harem in Edirne with a traditional princely education, studying the Qur’an, the hadiths (traditions of Muhammad), and the fundamentals of Islamic sciences, history, poetry and music under the supervision of private tutors. One of his tutors was chief mufti Feyzullah Efendi.

Ahmed was apparently curious and intellectual in nature, spending most of his time reading and practising calligraphy. The poems that he wrote manifest his profound knowledge of poetry, history, Islamic theology and philosophy. He was also interested in calligraphy, which he had studied with the leading court calligraphers, primarily with Hafız Osman Efendi (died 1698), who influenced his art immensely, and, therefore, practiced it because of the influence of his elder brother, the future Sultan Mustafa II, who also became a notable calligrapher.

During his princehood in Edirne, Ahmed made friends with a bright officer-scribe, Ibrahim, from the city of Nevşehir, who was to become one of the outstanding Grand Viziers of his future reign. From 1687, following the deposition of his father, he lived in isolation for sixteen years in the palaces of Edirne and Istanbul. During this period he dedicated himself to calligraphy and intellectual activities.

== Reign ==
=== Accession ===
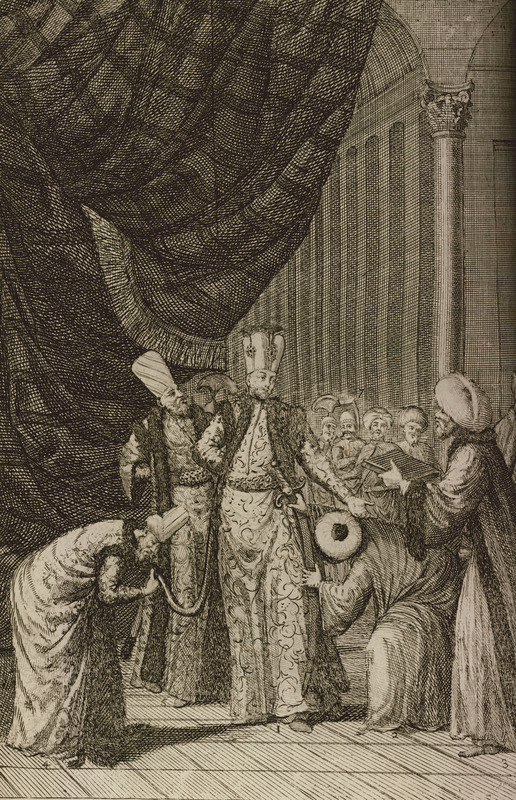
Ahmed III is proclaimed sultan and prepares to gird the sword of Osman

The Edirne succession occurred between 19 August to 23 August. Under Mustafa, Istanbul had been out of control for a long time. As arrests and executions mounted, theft and robbery incidents became common. The people were dissatisfied with the poor governing of the Empire. Mustafa was deposed by the Janissaries and Ahmed, who succeeded him to the throne on 22 August 1703. The first Friday salute was held in Bayezid Mosque.

Fındıklılı Mehmed Ağa welcomed the new sultan at the Harem gate on the Hasoda side, entered the arm, brought him to the Cardigan-i Saadet Department and placed them on the throne, and were among the first to pay tribute to him.

As part of the fief system, Ahmed reorganized the land law in 1705. Bringing order to land ownership reduced the crime wave and brought peace to the troubled Empire. Due to his ardent support of the new laws, Ahmed was given the title 'law-giver', a title given to only three sultans earlier, Bayezid II (r. 1481–1512), Selim I (r. 1512–1520) and Suleiman I (r. 1520–1566). In the first three years of his reign, Ahmed appointed four separate Grand Viziers. However, the government only gained some stability after the appointment of Çorlulu Ali Pasha in May 1706.

=== Russo-Turkish War of 1710–1711 ===
Ahmed III cultivated good relations with France, doubtless in view of Russia's menacing attitude. He afforded refuge in Ottoman territory to Charles XII of Sweden (1682–1718) after the Swedish defeat at the hands of Peter I of Russia (1672–1725) in the Battle of Poltava of 1709. In 1710 Charles XII convinced Sultan Ahmed III to declare war against Russia, and the Ottoman forces under Baltacı Mehmet Pasha won a major victory at the Battle of Prut. In the aftermath, Russia returned Azov back to the Ottomans, agreed to demolish the fortress of Taganrog and others in the area, and to stop interfering in the affairs of the Polish–Lithuanian Commonwealth.

Forced against his will into war with Russia, Ahmed III came nearer than any Ottoman sovereign before or since to breaking the power of his northern rival, whose armies his grand vizier Nevşehirli Damat İbrahim Pasha succeeded in completely surrounding at the Pruth River Campaign in 1711. The subsequent Ottoman victories against Russia enabled the Ottoman Empire to advance to Moscow, had the Sultan wished. However, this was halted as a report reached Istanbul that the Safavids were invading the Ottoman Empire, causing a period of panic, turning the Sultan's attention away from Russia.

=== Wars with Venice and Austria ===
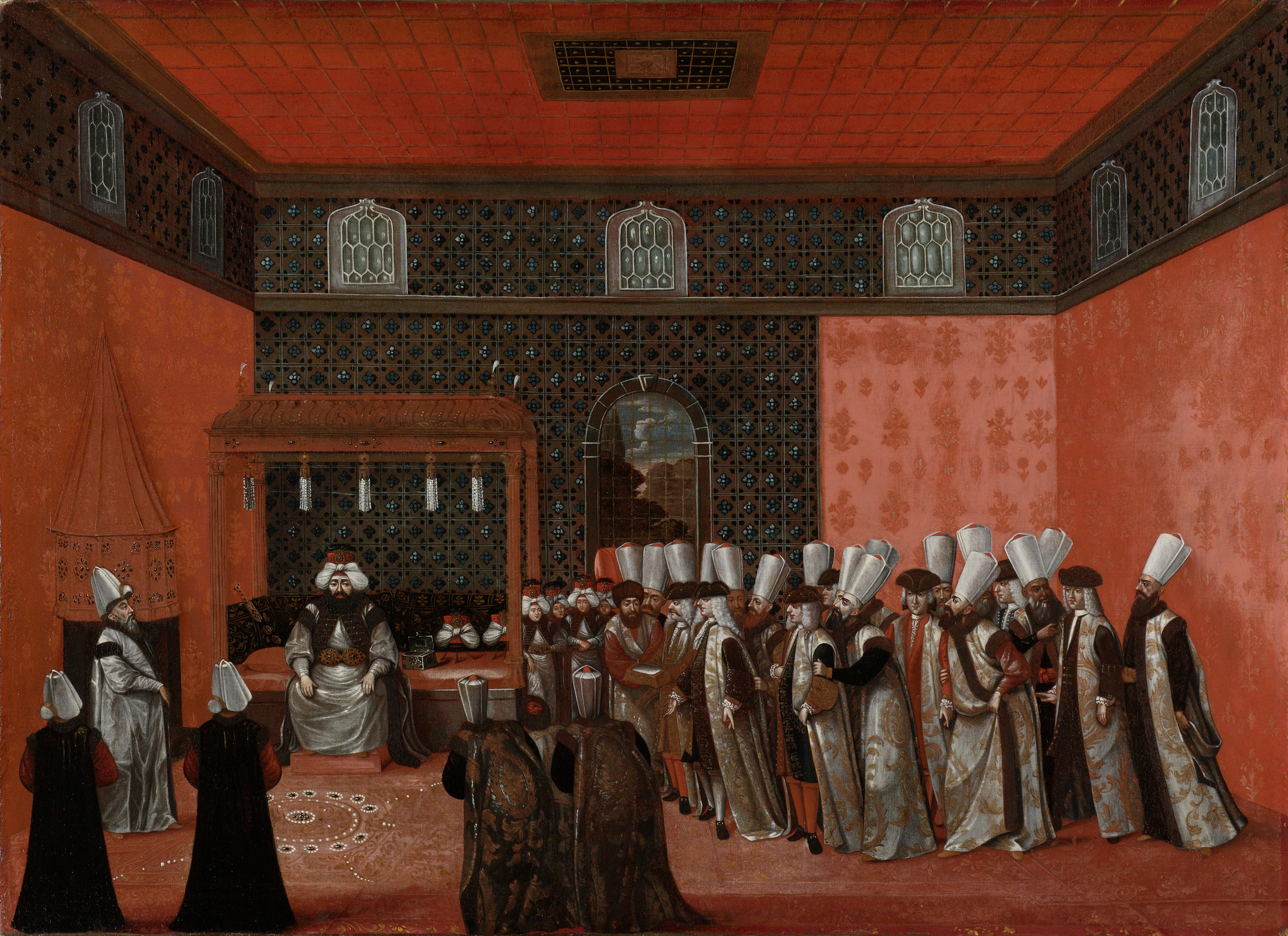
Ahmed III in the Imperial Darbar of Topkapi Palace.

On 9 December 1714, war was declared on Venice, an army under Silahdar Damat Ali Pasha's command managed to recover the whole Morea (Peloponnese) from Venice through coordinated operations of the army and navy.

This success alarmed Austria and, in April 1716, Emperor Charles VI provoked the Porte into a declaration of war. The war went badly for the Ottomans, with an army commanded by Silahdar Ali Pasha defeated heavily at the Battle of Petrovaradin, with another serious defeat occurring at the Siege of Belgrade (1717). The war finalized with the Treaty of Passarowitz, signed on 21 July 1718, according to which Belgrade, Banat, and Oltenia were ceded to Austria. This failure was a disappointment for Ahmed as the treaty led to Istanbul's economy suffering from increased inflation.

Nevşehirli Damat Ibrahim Pasha who was the second leading figure of the empire after Ahmed had joined the Morea campaign in 1715, and was appointed as the city of Nish's minister of finance the following year. This post helped him realize the downturn of the state's finances, which led him to avoid war as much as possible during his vizierate. Ibrahim Pasha's policy of peace suited Ahmed well since he had no wish to lead any military campaigns, in addition to the fact that his interest in art and culture made him reluctant to leave Istanbul.

=== Character of Ahmed's rule ===
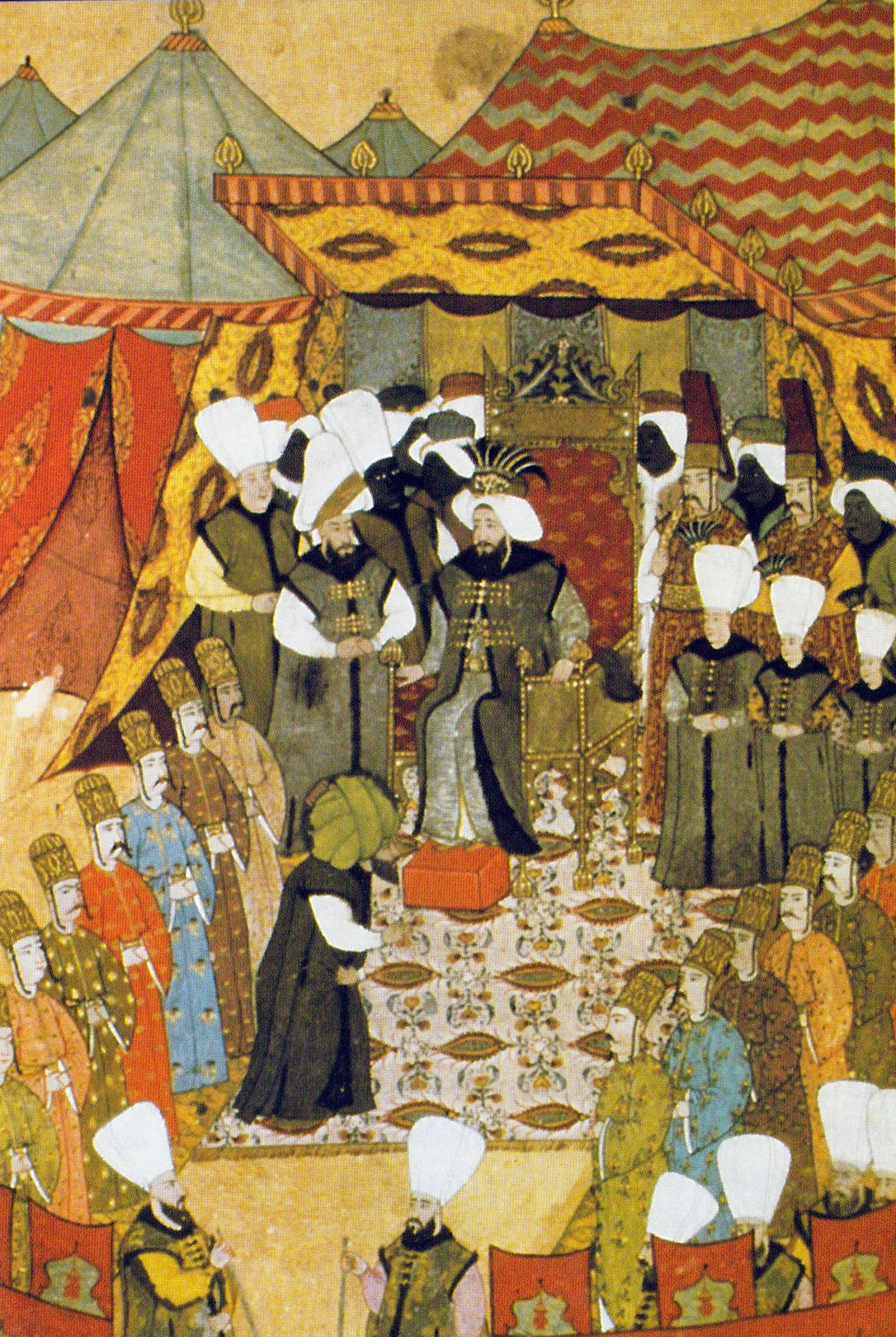
Sultan Ahmed III at a reception, painted in 1720

While shooting competitions were held in Okmeydanı, Istanbul with the idea of increasing the morale of the soldiers and the people, a new warship was launched in Tersane-i Amire.

He tried three grand viziers at short intervals. Instead of Hasan Pasha, he appointed Kalaylikoz Ahmed Pasha on 24 September 1704, and Baltacı Mehmed Pasha on 25 December 1704.

In 1707, a conspiracy led by Eyüplü Ali Ağa was unearthed to bring the sultan off the throne. What resulted were that necks were ordered to be cut in front of the Bab-I-Hümayun.

Ahmed III left the finances of the Ottoman Empire in a flourishing condition, which had remarkably been obtained without excessive taxation or extortionate procedures. He was a cultivated patron of literature and art, and it was in his time that the first printing press was authorized to use either the Arabic or Turkish languages; it was set up in Istanbul, and operated by Ibrahim Muteferrika (while the printing press had been introduced to Constantinople in 1480, all published works before 1729 were in Greek, Armenian, or Hebrew). Esad of Ioannina was the press's copyeditor.

It was in his reign that an important change in the government of the Danubian Principalities was introduced: previously, the Porte had appointed Hospodars, usually native Moldavian and Wallachian boyars, to administer those provinces; after the Russian campaign of 1711, during which Peter the Great found an ally in Moldavia Prince Dimitrie Cantemir, the Porte began overtly deputizing Phanariote Greeks in that region, and extended the system to Wallachia after Prince Stefan Cantacuzino established links with Prince Eugene of Savoy. The Phanariotes constituted a kind of Dhimmi nobility, which supplied the Porte with functionaries in many important departments of the state.

=== Foreign relations ===
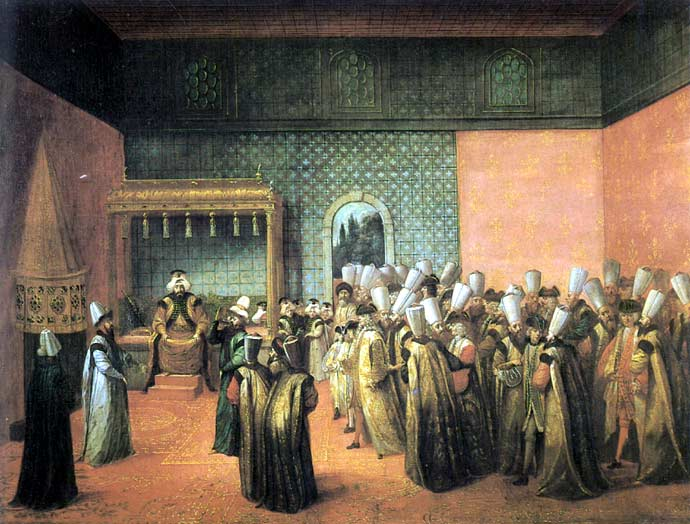
Sultan Ahmed III receives French ambassador Vicomte d'Andrezel at Topkapı Palace.

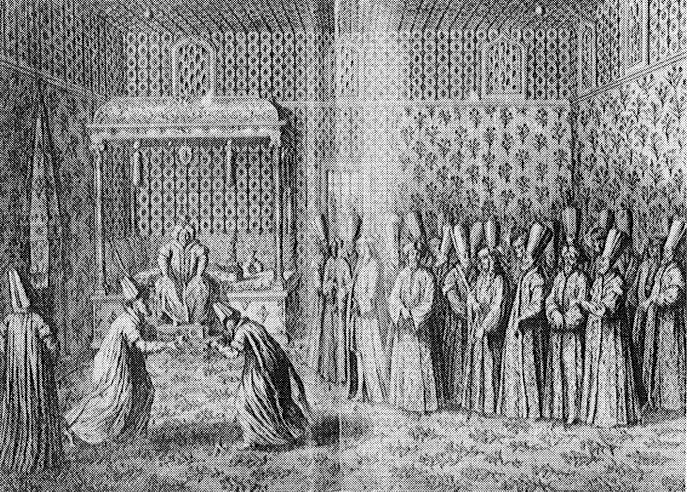
French ambassador Marquis de Bonnac being received by Sultan Ahmed III.

The ambassadors of Safavid Iran and Austria were well received when they arrived in 1706 to 1707.

In the year 1712, the Mughal Emperor Jahandar Shah, a grandson of Aurangzeb, sent gifts to the Ottoman Sultan Ahmed III and referred to himself as the Ottoman Sultan's devoted admirer.

The Mughal Emperor Farrukhsiyar, another grandson of Aurangzeb, is also known to have sent a letter to the Ottomans but this time it was received by the Grand Vizier Nevşehirli Damad Ibrahim Pasha. The letter provided a graphic description of the efforts of the Mughal commander Syed Hassan Ali Khan Barha fighting against the Rajput and Maratha rebellion.

=== Deposition ===
Sultan Ahmed III had become unpopular by reason of the excessive pomp and costly luxury in which he and his principal officers indulged; on 20 September 1730, a mutinous riot of seventeen Janissaries, led by the Albanian Patrona Halil, was aided by the citizens as well as the military until it swelled into an insurrection, this consequently led the Sultan to give up his throne.

Ahmed voluntarily led his nephew Mahmud I (1730–1754) to the seat of sovereignty and paid allegiance to him as Sultan of the Empire. He then retired to the Kafes previously occupied by Mahmud and died at Topkapı Palace after six years of confinement.

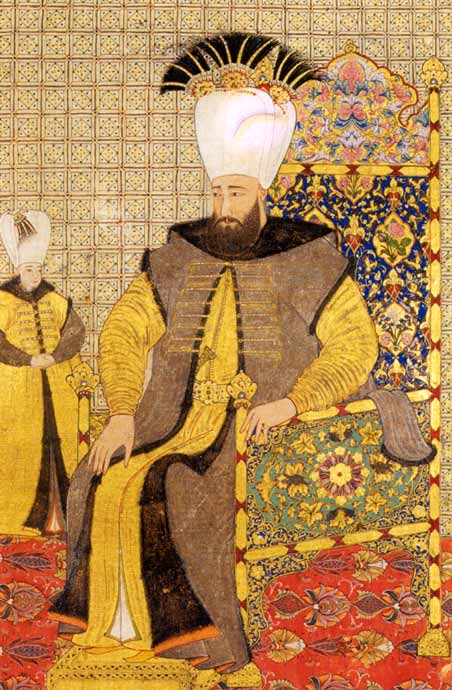
Levni miniature

== Architecture ==
Ahmed III commissioned the building of water claps, fountains, park waterfalls and three libraries, one inside the Topkapı Palace, with the famous lines "Ahmed was a master in the writings on plates" which have survived. The “Basmala” at the Topkapi Palace apartment door with its plates in the Üsküdar Yeni Mosque are among them.

A library was built by Ahmed in 1724–1725 situated next to the tomb entrance of Turhan Sultan, the structure has stone-brick alternate meshed walls, is square-shaped and covered with a flattened dome with an octagonal rim, which is provided with pendentives. There are original pen works left in the pendentives and dome of the library.

== Disasters ==
In 1714, an Egyptian galleon near the Gümrük (Eminönü) Pier caught fire and burned, which resulted in the deaths of 200 people.

While Nevşehirli Damat Ibrahim Pasha continued his preparations for his return to Istanbul, a fire broke out in the city. The districts of Unkapanı, Azapkapı, Zeyrek, Fatih, Saraçhane, Horhor, Etmeydanı, Molla Gürani, Altımermer, Ayazma Gate, Kantarcılar, Vefa, Vez Neciler, Old Rooms, Acemioğlanlar Barracks, Çukur Çeşme, Langa, Davudpaşa were burned from the fire.

A large three-minute earthquake occurred on 14 May 1719. While the city walls of Istanbul were destroyed in the earthquake, 4,000 people died in Izmit and Yalova was destroyed. Reconstruction work followed after the quake ended in Istanbul. The most meaningful element to reflect the cultural aspect or weight of these works today is the Topkapı Palace Enderun Library, which was built in that year. A rich foundation was established for this institution, which is also known as the Sultan Ahmed-i Salis Library, which has a face-to-face with its architectural and valuable manuscripts.

== Family ==
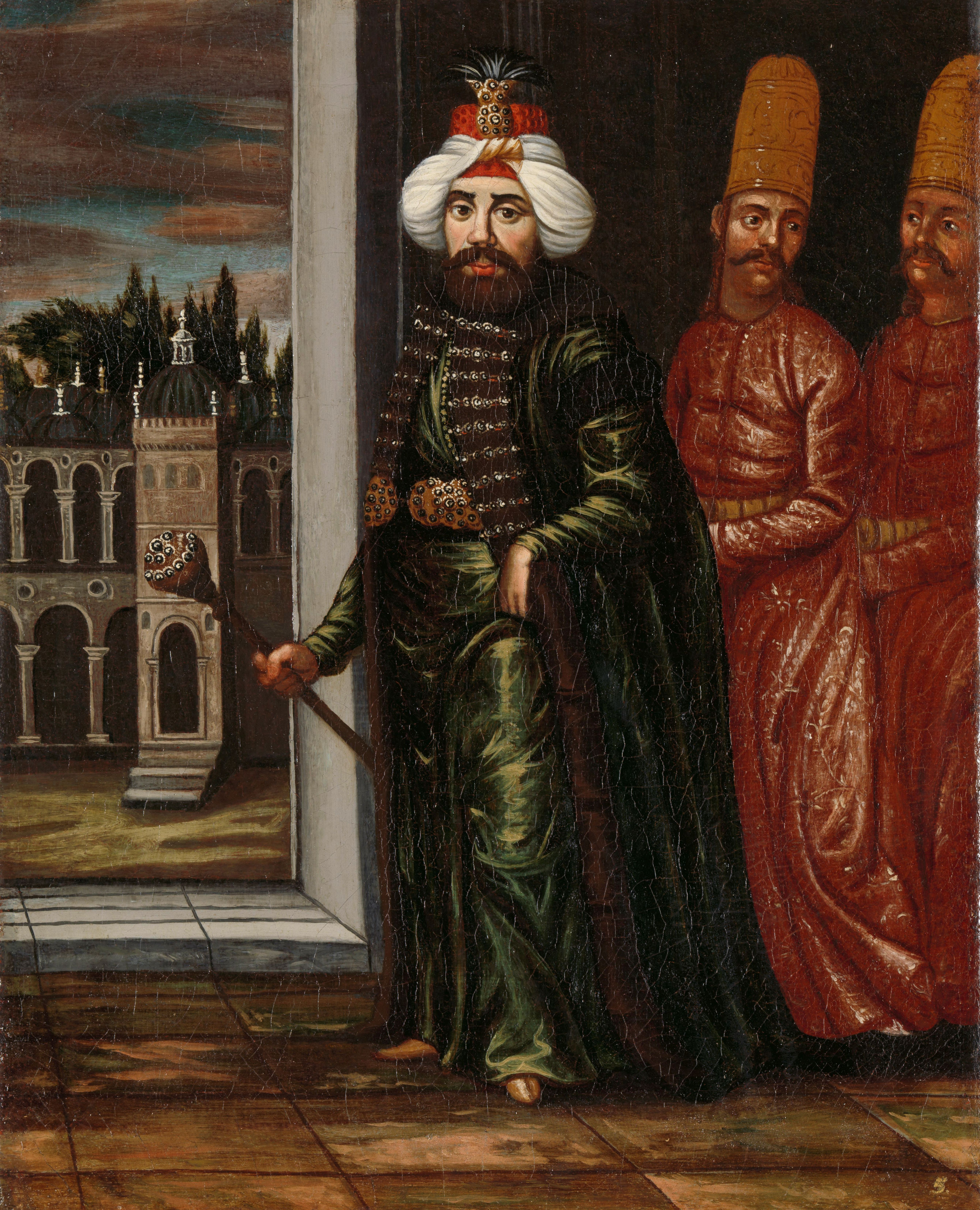
Jean Baptiste Vanmour portrait

Ahmed III is known to be the Sultan with the largest family (and harem) of the Ottoman dynasty. The hostess of his harem was Dilhayat Kalfa, known to be one of the greatest Turkish composeress of the early modern period.

=== Consorts ===
Ahmed III had at least twenty-one consorts:

- Emetullah Banu Kadın. Baş Kadin (first consort) and his first concubine, she was the mother of Fatma Sultan, Ahmed's firstborn and favorite daughter. She was Ahmed's most beloved consort, who dedicated a mosque, a school and a fountain to her. Very devoted and active in charity, she died in 1740 in the Old Palace.
- Emine Mihrişah Kadın. She was the mother of four sons including Mustafa III, 26th Sultan of the Ottoman Empire, but she died before her son's rise and therefore was never Valide Sultan. She died in April 1732. Her son built the Ayazma Mosque in her honor in Üsküdar.
- Rabia Şermi Kadın. She was the mother of Abdülhamid I, 27th Sultan of the Ottoman Empire, but she premorted at the rise of her son and therefore was never Valide Sultan. In 1728, a fountain was dedicated to her in Üsküdar. She died in 1732. Her son built the Beylerbeyi Mosque in her honor.
- Ayşe Mihri Behri Kadın. Before she became a consort, she was treasurer of the harem.
- Hatem Kadın. Mother of twins, she died in 1772 and was buried in Eyüp cemetery.
- Emine Musli Kadın. Also called Muslıhe Kadın, Muslu Kadin or Musalli Kadın. She was the mother of two daughters, she died in 1750 and was buried with them in the Yeni Cami.
- Rukiye Kadın. Mother of a daughter and a son, she built a fountain near the Yeni Cami. She died after 1738 and was buried with her daughter in the Yeni Cami.
- Fatma Hümaşah Kadın. She died in 1732 and was buried by the Yeni Cami.
- Gülneş Kadın. Also called Gülnuş Kadın. She is listed in a document naming her consorts exiled to Old Palace after the deposition of Ahmed III whose jewels were confiscated. She died after 1730.
- Hürrem Kadın. Listed in a document that names the consorts exiled to Old Palace after the deposition of Ahmed III whose jewels were confiscated. She died after 1730.
- Meyli Kadın. Listed in a document that names the consorts exiled to Old Palace after the deposition of Ahmed III whose jewels were confiscated. She died after 1730.
- Hatice Kadın. She died in 1722 and was buried in the Yeni Cami.
- Nazife Kadın. Listed in a document that names the consorts exiled to Old Palace after the deposition of Ahmed III whose jewels were confiscated. She died after 1730, perhaps the 29 December 1764.
- Nejat Kadın. Listed in a document that names the consorts exiled to Old Palace after the deposition of Ahmed III whose jewels were confiscated. She died after 1730.
- Sadık Kadın. Also called Sadıka Kadin. Listed in a document that names the consorts exiled to Old Palace after the deposition of Ahmed III whose jewels were confiscated. She died after 1730.
- Hüsnüşah Kadın. She died in 1733 and was buried in the Yeni Cami.
- Şahin Kadın. She died in 1732 and was buried in the Yeni Cami.
- Ümmügülsüm Kadın. She died in 1768 and was buried in the Yeni Cami.
- Zeyneb Kadın. Mother of a daughter, she died in 1757 and was buried by the Yeni Cami.
- Hanife Kadın. Mother of a daughter, she died in 1750 and was buried in the Yeni Cami.
- Şayeste Hanim. BaşIkbal. She died in 1722 and was buried by the Yeni Cami.

=== Sons ===
Ahmed III had at least twenty-one sons, all buried, apart from the two who became Sultans, in the Yeni Cami:

- Şehzade Mehmed (24 November 1705 - 30 July 1706).
- Şehzade Isa (23 February 1706 - 14 May 1706).
- Şehzade Ali (18 June 1706 - 12 September 1706).
- Şehzade Selim (29 August 1706 - 15 April 1708).
- Şehzade Murad (17 November 1707 - 1707).
- Şehzade Murad (25 January 1708 - 1 April 1708).
- Şehzade Abdülmecid (12 December 1709 - 18 March 1710). Twin of Şehzade Abdülmelek.
- Şehzade Abdülmelek (12 December 1709 - 7 March 1711). Twin of Şehzade Abdülmecid.
- Şehzade Süleyman (25 August 1710 - 11 October 1732) - with Mihrişah Kadin. He died in the Kafes after two years of imprisonment.
- Şehzade Mehmed (8 October 1712 - 15 July 1713).
- Şehzade Selim (21 March 1715 - February 1718) - with Hatem Kadın. Twin of Saliha Sultan.
- Şehzade Mehmed (2 January 1717 - 2 January 1756) - with Rukiye Kadın. He died in the Kafes after twenty-six years of imprisonment.
- Mustafa III (28 January 1717 - 21 January 1774) - with Mihrişah Kadin. 26th Sultan of the Ottoman Empire after twenty-seven years of imprisonment in the Kafes.
- Şehzade Bayezid (4 October 1718 - 24 January 1771) - with Mihrişah Kadin. He died in the Kafes after forty-one years of imprisonment.
- Şehzade Abdullah (18 December 1719 - 19 December 1719).
- Şehzade Ibrahim (12 September 1720 - 16 March 1721).
- Şehzade Numan (22 February 1723 - 29 December 1764). He died in the Kafes after thirty-four years of imprisonment.
- Abdul Hamid I (20 March 1725 - 7 April 1789) - with Rabia Şermi Kadın. 27th Sultan of the Ottoman Empire after forty-four years of imprisonment in the Kafes.
- Şehzade Seyfeddin (3 February 1728 - 1732) - with Mihrişah Kadin. He died in the Kafes after two years of imprisonment.
- Şehzade Mahmud (1730 - 22 December 1756). He died in the Kafes after twenty-six years of imprisonment.
- Şehzade Hassan (? - ?). He probably died in the Kafes.

=== Daughters ===
Ahmed III had at least thirty-six daughters:

- Fatma Sultan (22 September 1704 - May 1733) - with Emetullah Kadın. She was her father's favorite daughter. She married twice and had two sons and two daughters. She and her second husband were the real power during the Tulip Era. She fell from grace after the Patrona Halil revolt and was confined to Çırağan Palace, where she died three years later.
- Ayşe Sultan (? - 1706). Buried in the Yeni Cami.
- Mihrimah Sultan (17 June 1706 - ?). She died as a child and was buried in the Yeni Cami.
- Hatice Sultan (21 January 1707 - 22 January 1708). Buried in the mausoleum Turhan Sultan in the Yeni Cami.
- Rukiye Sultan (3 March 1707 - 29 August 1707). She was buried in the Yeni Cami.
- Ümmügülsüm Sultan (11 February 1708 - 28 November 1732). Twin of Zeynep Sultan. She married once and had four sons and a daughter.
- Zeynep Sultan (11 February 1708 - 5 November 1708). Twin sister of Ümmügülsüm Sultan. She was buried in the Yeni Cami.
- Zeynep Sultan (5 January 1710 - July 1710). She was buried in the Yeni Cami.
- Hatice Sultan (8 February 1710 - 1710, before September). She was buried in the Turhan Sultan mausoleum in Yeni Cami.
- Hatice Sultan (27 September 1710 - 1738) - with Rukiye Kadın. She married twice and had a son.
- Emine Sultan (1711 - 1720). She was buried in the Yeni Cami.
- Atike Sultan (29 February 1712 - 2 April 1737). She got married once and she had a son.
- Rukiye Sultan (7 March 1713 - October 1715). Buried in the Turhan Sultan mausoleum in Yeni Cami.
- Zeynep Asima Sultan (8 April 1714 - March 25, 1774). She married twice and she had a son.
- Saliha Sultan (21 March 1715 - 11 October 1778) - with Hatem Kadın. Twin of Şehzade Selim. She was married five times and had a son and four daughters.
- Ayşe Sultan (10 October 1715 - 9 July 1775) - with Musli Kadın. Nicknamed Küçük Ayşe (meaning Ayşe the youngest) to distinguish her from her cousin Ayşe the eldest, daughter of Mustafa II. She married three times and had a daughter.
- Ferdane Sultan (? - 1718). She died as a child and she was buried in the Yeni Cami.
- Reyhane Sultan (1718 - 1729). Also called Reyhan Sultan or Rihane Sultan. She was buried in the Yeni Cami.
- Ümmüseleme Sultan (? - 1719). Also called Ümmüselma Sultan. She died as a child and was buried in the Yeni Cami.
- Rabia Sultan (19 November 1719 - before 1727). She was buried in the Yeni Cami.
- Emetullah Sultan (1719 - 1723) Also called Ümmetullah Sultan. She was buried in the Yeni Cami.
- Rukiye Sultan (? - 1720). She died as a child and was buried in the Yeni Cami.
- Beyhan Sultan (? - 1720). She died as a child and was buried in the Yeni Cami.
- Emetullah Sultan (17 September 1723 - 28 January 1724). She was buried in the Yeni Cami.
- Emine Sultan (late 1723/early 1724 - 1732). She was buried in the Yeni Cami.
- Nazife Sultan (May 1723/1725 - before 1730 or 29 December 1764). Exceptionally, she never married, most likely because she was chronically ill or had physical and/or mental problems. She lived in seclusion in the Old Palace all her life. However, according to other historians, she actually died a child and the Nazife who died in the Old Palace in 1764 was instead one of Ahmed III's consorts with the same name, Nazife Kadin.
- Ümmüselene Sultan (12 October 1724 - 5 December 1732). She was buried in the Yeni Cami.
- Naile Sultan (15 December 1725 - October 1727). She was buried in the Yeni Cami.
- Esma Sultan (14 March 1726 - 13 August 1778) - with Hanife Kadın or Zeyneb Kadın. Nicknamed Büyük Esma (meaning Esma the eldest) to distinguish her from her niece Esma the younger, daughter of Abdülhamid I. She married three times and had a daughter.
- Sabiha Sultan (19 December 1726 - 17 December 1726). She was buried in the Yeni Cami.
- Rabia Sultan (28 October 1727 - 4 April 1728). Also called Rebia Sultan. She was buried in the Yeni Cami.
- Zübeyde Sultan (28 March 1728 - 4 June 1756) - with Musli Kadın. She married twice.
- Ümmi Sultan (? - 1729). Called also Ümmügülsüm Sultan. She was buried in the Yeni Cami.
- Ümmühabibe Sultan (? - 1730). She was buried in the Yeni Cami.
- Akile Sultan (? - 1737). She was buried in the Yeni Cami.
- Ümmi Sultan (1730 - 1742). Called also Ümmügülsüm Sultan. She was buried in the Yeni Cami.

== Death ==
Ahmed lived in Kafes of the Topkapi Palace for six years following his deposition, where he fell ill and died on 1 July 1736. He was buried in his grandmother's tomb in Turhan Sultan Mausoleum in New Mosque, at Eminönü in Istanbul.

== In fiction ==
In Voltaire's Candide, the eponymous main character meets the deposed Ahmed III on a ship from Venice to Constantinople. The Sultan is in the company of five other deposed European monarchs, and he tells Candide, who initially doubts his credentials:

I am not jesting, my name is Achmet III. For several years I was Sultan; I dethroned my brother; my nephew dethroned me; they cut off the heads of my viziers; I am ending my days in the old seraglio; my nephew, Sultan Mahmoud, sometimes allows me to travel for my health, and I have come to spend the Carnival at Venice."

This episode was taken up by the modern Turkish writer Nedim Gürsel as the setting of his 2001 novel Le voyage de Candide à Istanbul.

In fact, there is no evidence of the deposed Sultan being allowed to make such foreign travels, nor did Voltaire (or Gürsel) assert that it had any actual historical foundation.

== See also ==
- Fountain of Ahmed III
- Fountain of Ahmed III (Üsküdar)
- Ibrahim Muteferrika

== Sources ==
- This article incorporates text from the History of Ottoman Turks (1878)
- Aktep, Münir (1989). "Ahmed III". TDV Encyclopedia of Islam, Vol. 2 (Ahlâk – Amari̇) (in Turkish). Istanbul: Presidency of Religious Affairs, Centre for Islamic Studies. pp. 34–38. ISBN 978-975-389-429-6.
- Ágoston, Gábor; Masters, Bruce, eds. (2009). Encyclopedia of the Ottoman Empire. New York: Facts On File. ISBN 978-0816062591.
- Aktaş, Ali (2008). ÇELEBİZÂDE ÂSIM TARİHİ: Transkripsiyonlu metin.
- Haskan, Mehmet Nermi (2001). Yüzyıllar boyunca Üsküdar - Volume 3. Üsküdar Belediyesi. p. 1332. ISBN 978-9-759-76063-2.
- Keskiner, Philippe Bora (2012). Sultan Ahmed III (r. 1703–1730) as a Calligrapher and Patron of Calligraphy.
- Sakaoğlu, Necdet (2008). Bu mülkün kadın sultanları: Vâlide sultanlar, hâtunlar, hasekiler, kadınefendiler, sultanefendiler. Oğlak Yayıncılık. ISBN 978-9-753-29623-6.
- Sakaoğlu, Necdet (2015). Bu Mülkün Sultanları. Alfa Yayıncılık. ISBN 978-6-051-71080-8.
- Topal, Mehmet (2001). Silahdar Findiklili Mehmed Agha Nusretnâme: Tahlil ve Metin (1106–1133/1695–1721).
- Türkal, Merve (2013). Silahdar Findiklili Mehmed Ağa'nin Hayati ve eserleri (1658 / 1726–27).
- Uluçay, Mustafa Çağatay (2011). Padişahların kadınları ve kızları. Ankara: Ötüken. ISBN 978-9-754-37840-5.
- Uysal, Zekiye (2019). Topkapı Sarayındaki III. Ahmet Kütüphanesi'nin Alçı Bezemeleri.

Ahmed III House of Osman Born: 30 December 1673 Died: 1 July 1736
Regnal titles
Preceded by Mustafa II	Sultan of the Ottoman Empire; 22 August 1703 – 1 October 1730	Succeeded by Mahmud I
Sunni Islam titles
Preceded by Mustafa II	Caliph of the Ottoman Caliphate; 22 August 1703 – 1 October 1730	Succeeded by Mahmud I
