= Ibrahim Muteferrika =

Ottoman polymath

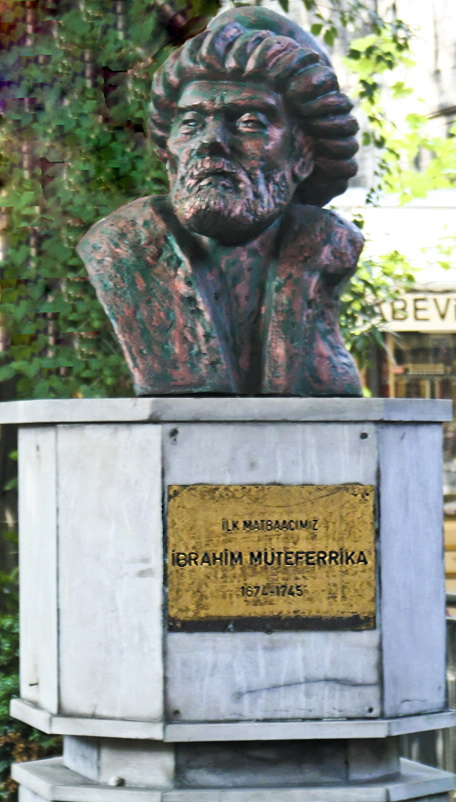
Bust of Muteferrika

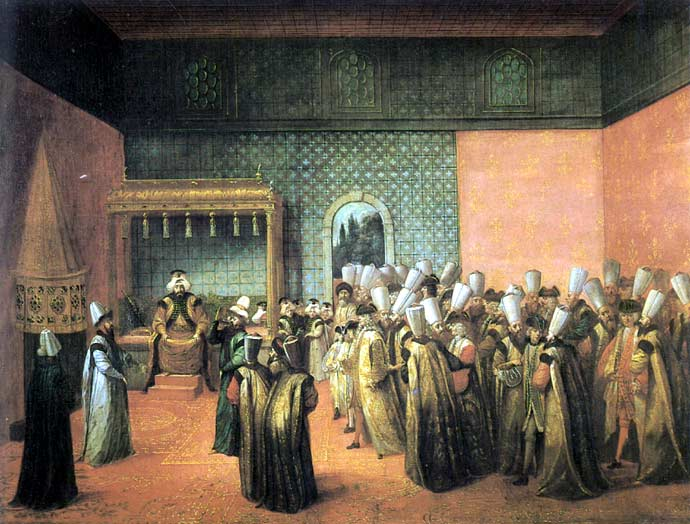
Sultan Ahmed III receives French ambassador Vicomte d'Andrezel at Topkapı Palace.

Ibrahim Muteferrika (Turkish: İbrahim Müteferrika; 1674–1745 CE) was a Hungarian-born Ottoman diplomat, publisher, economist, historian, Islamic theologian, sociologist, and the first Muslim to run a printing press with movable Arabic type.

== Early life ==
Ibrahim Muteferrika was born in Kolozsvár (present-day Cluj-Napoca, Romania). He was an ethnic Hungarian Unitarian who converted to Islam, but his original Hungarian name is unknown.

== Diplomatic service ==
At a young age, Ibrahim Muteferrika entered the Ottoman diplomatic services. He took an active part in the negotiations with Austria and Russia. Ibrahim Muteferrika was an active figure in promoting the Ottoman-French alliance (1737–1739) against Austria and Russia. Ibrahim Muteferrika was also acclaimed for his role in the Ottoman-Swedish action against Russia.

During his services as a diplomat, he is known to have befriended many influential personalities including Osman Aga of Temesvar, a fellow diplomat of Transylvanian origins and former prisoner-of-war imprisoned in Austria.

It was during his years as a diplomat that he took a keen interest in collecting books that helped him understand the ongoing Renaissance, the emergence of Protestant movements in Europe, and the rise of powerful colonial empires in Europe.

== Printing press ==
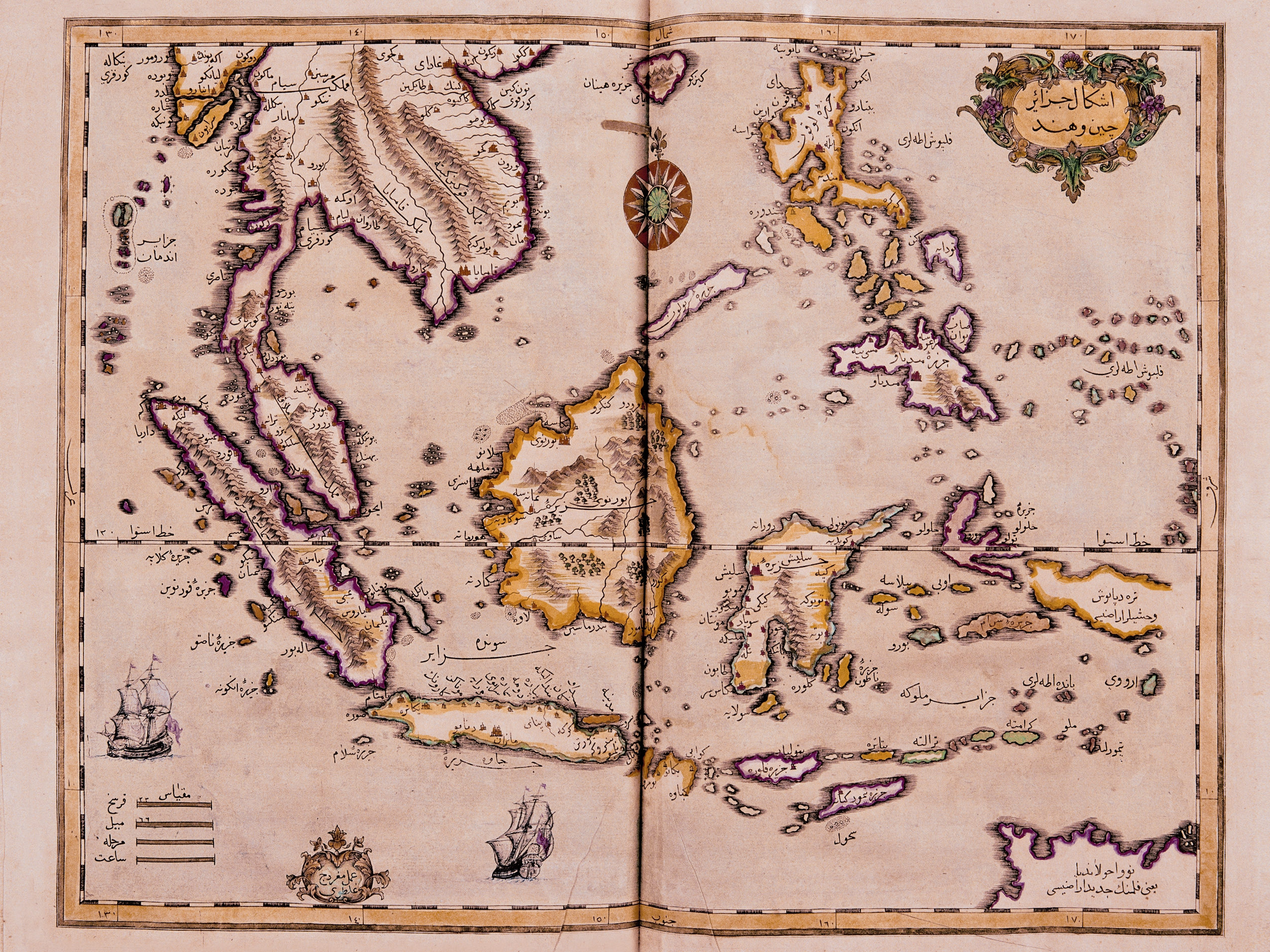
This map of the Indian Ocean and the China Sea was engraved in 1728 by the Hungarian-born Ottoman polymath and publisher Ibrahim Muteferrika; it is one of a series that illustrated Katip Çelebi’s Cihannuma (Universal Geography), the first printed book of maps and drawings to appear in the Muslim world.

The printing press had already been known in the Ottoman Empire since 1493 or 1504 in Hebrew characters. Other communities operated presses. The first Ottoman press using movable Arabic type was operated in 1706–1711 in Aleppo by Christians. Kenyan academic Calestous Juma argues that printing was delayed in the Islamic world due to the greater emphasis on oral transmission in Islamic tradition compared to Christianity and Judaism, as well as the cultural significance of religious books and calligraphy manuscripts; scribes especially exerted a strong resistance.

Muteferrika's volumes, printed in Istanbul and using custom-made fonts, are occasionally referred to as "Turkish incunabula". Muteferrika, whose last name derived from his employment as a müteferrika, or head of the household, under Sultan Ahmed III and during the Tulip Era, was also a geographer, astronomer, and philosopher.

Following a 1726 report on the efficiency of the new system, which he drafted and presented simultaneously to Grand Vizier Nevşehirli Damat İbrahim Pasha, the Grand Mufti, and the clergy, and a later request submitted to Sultan Ahmed III, he received permission to publish non-religious books (despite opposition from some Islamic calligraphers and religious leaders). Muteferrika's press published its first book in 1729, and, by 1743, issued 17 works in 23 volumes (each having between 500 and 1,000 copies). The first book ever published by Muteferrika is "Vankulu Lügati", a 2-volume Arabic-Turkish dictionary. Printing religious books was prohibited until 1803.

Among the works published by Müteferrika were historical and generically scientific works, as well as Katip Çelebi's world atlas Cihannüma (loosely translated as The Mirror of the World or the World Seer). In a digression that he added to his printing, Müteferrika discussed the heliocentrism of astronomy in detail, with references to relatively up-to-date scientific arguments for and against it. In that regard, he is considered one of the first people to properly introduce heliocentrism to Ottoman readers.

After 1742, however, Ibrahim Muteferrika's printing activities were discontinued and an attempt by the British diplomat James Mario Matra, motivated by the exorbitant prices for manuscript books, to re-establish a press in Istanbul was aborted in 1779. In his account, Matra refers to the strong opposition of the scribes that Müteferrika's enterprise had faced:

A Press had been set up here about sixty years ago in the turbulent reign of Ahmed III but those who maintained themselves by copying of Books, apprehending with reason that their trade would be totally ruined, were so loud in their clamours as to alarm the Seraglio, and as they were supported by a seditious Corps of Janissary, the Sultan apprehending what really did after happen, that as he mounted the throne by one insurrection, he might be tumbled from it by another, gave way to their complaints, and suppressed the Press, before anything better than the Quran, Sunnah, and some trifling books of Mathematics had been struck off.

== Legacy ==
A statue of Muteferrika can be found in the Sahaflar Çarşısı adjacent to the Grand Bazaar in Istanbul.

== Books published ==
There were 17 titles published by Muteferrika at his press during his lifetime:

1. Kitab-ı Lügat-ı Vankulu (Sihah El-Cevheri), 2 volumes, 1729
2. Tuhfet-ül Kibar fi Esfar el-Bihar, 1729
3. Tarih-i Seyyah, 1729
4. Tarih-i Hind-i Garbi, 1730
5. Tarih-i Timur Gürgan, 1730
6. Tarih-I Mısr-i Kadim ve Mısr-i Cedid, 1730
7. Gülşen-i Hülefa, 1730
8. Grammaire Turque, 1730
9. Usul el-Hikem fi Nizam el-Ümem, 1732
10. Fiyuzat-ı Mıknatısiye, 1732
11. Cihan-nüma, 1732
12. Takvim el-Tevarih, 1733
13. Kitab-ı Tarih-i Naima, 2 volumes, 1734
14. Tarih-i Raşid, 3 volumes, 1735
15. Tarih-i Çelebizade, 1741
16. Ahval-i Gazavat der Diyar-ı Bosna, 1741
17. Kitab-ı Lisan el-Acem el Müsemma bi-Ferheng-i Şuuri, 2 volumes, 1742

(Most of the copies of the book Tarih-i Çelebizade have been bound into the third and last volume of Tarih-i Raşid and sold together with it and thus have erroneously led several sources to believe a total of 16 items have been published.)

== Own works ==
- Risâle Islâmiyye (available in manuscript form) (published by [Esed Cosan] in 1993)

== See also ==
- Great Divergence
- Printing

== Sources ==
- Clogg, Richard (1979), "An Attempt to Revive Turkish Printing in Istanbul in 1779", International Journal of Middle East Studies, 10 (1): 67–70, doi:10.1017/s0020743800053320, S2CID 159835641
- Watson, William J. (1968), "İbrāhīm Müteferriḳa and Turkish Incunabula", Journal of the American Oriental Society, 88 (3): 435–441, doi:10.2307/596868, JSTOR 596868
