= Fatma Sultan (daughter of Ahmed III) =

Ottoman princess, daughter of Ahmed III and Emetullah Kadın

- Born: 22 September 1704; Topkapı Palace, Constantinople, Ottoman Empire
- Died: 4 January 1733 (aged 28); Constantinople, Ottoman Empire
- Burial: Turhan Sultan Mausoleum, New Mosque, Istanbul
- Spouse: Silahdar Damat Ali Pasha (m. 1709; died 1716) Nevşehirli Damat Ibrahim Pasha (m. 1717; died 1730)
- Issue: Second marriage Sultanzade Mehmed Pasha; Sultanzade Genç Mehmed Bey; Fatma Hanımsultan; Hibetullah Hanımsultan
- Dynasty: Ottoman
- Father: Ahmed III
- Mother: Emetullah Kadın
- Religion: Sunni Islam

Fatma Sultan (Ottoman Turkish: فاطمہ سلطان; 22 September 1704 – 4 January 1733) was an Ottoman princess, daughter of Sultan Ahmed III and Emetullah Kadın. She was politically active and influential in the affairs of state during the late Tulip era (1718–1730).

== Early life ==
Fatma Sultan was born on 22 September 1704 in the Topkapı Palace. Her father was Sultan Ahmed III, and her mother was Emetullah Kadın. She was the eldest child and daughter born to her father. She was also his favorite child.

== First marriage ==
In 1709, at the age of five, Ahmed betrothed her to Silahdar (Şehid) Ali Pasha. The wedding events took place from 11 to 16 May 1709 in the Topkapı Palace. In the meantime, Silahdar Ali Pasha was given the rank of vizier and kaymakam. On 16 May, Fatma was taken from the Topkapı Palace to the Valide Sultan's palace in Eyüp, which was allocated for the wedding. The wedding lasted until 20 May.

Silahdar Ali Pasha became Grand Vizier in 1713. However, he died in 1716, when Fatma was twelve years old.

== Second marriage ==
In 1717, when Fatma was thirteen, Ahmed arranged her marriage to Nevşehirli Ibrahim Pasha. For the wedding, Ibrahim received a sable fur coat. The wedding took place on 22 February 1717 in Edirne. Ibrahim Pasha was fifty years old at that time, older than her father, and had divorced his first wife in order to marry the princess. The marriage was consummated only a few years later, as Fatma was too young. Just over a year later, Ibrahim Pasha took over as grand vizier on 9 May 1718.

Despite the age difference, the marriage was very happy. Ibrahim was very much in love with his wife and was happy to grant her every wish, while Fatma was famous for being incredibly jealous of her husband and constantly asked her father to tell her if he was faithful to her or not.

By 1724 Ibrahim Pasha and Fatma had several palaces at different locations. Following their marriage in 1717, the one across from the Kiosk of Processions on the landwalls of the Topkapı Palace, which had long housed many grand viziers, grew into a monumental complex as Ibrahim Pasha and Fatma continued to annex nearby palaces, and busied themselves with restoring and rebuilding them.

Ibrahim Pasha stated his longing for Fatma Sultan with a poem. Pasha explains this love and sorrow in one place:

"The crown of my life! The light of my eye! I am drowning in painful tears.

She was described as having had a large political influence on both her father, who left the ruling to her husband, and on her husband, the Grand Vizier. Some sources regard her as the real ruler of the later part of the Tulip era. She often acted as an intermediary between foreign ambassadors and her father or husband. A French ambassador complained that obtaining his favor was the only way to obtain an audience with the sultan and the Grand Vizier.

Fatma favored the French and intervened several times on their behalf. She obtained the release of an imprisoned French consul, who in exchange gave her three diamond buttons. In addition, she introduced certain French customs and behaviors to the court, including fashion. She was said to have assisted the Marquis de Villeneuve, French ambassador to the Ottoman Empire from 1728 to 1741, in favour of an Ottoman policy benefitting to French interests during the Russo-Austrian-Turkish War (1735–1739).

She has been referred to as the last really influent princess of the Ottoman Empire.

The couple lived for several years during Tulip Age (Lâle Devri), an era associated with the reign of Sultan Ahmed III and characterized by courtly extravagance. They had four children: two sons and two daughters.

Fatma Sultan was widowed in 1730, when her husband Ibrahim Pasha, who was sixty-four years old, was killed during the Patrona Halil revolt, which led to the deposition of her father Sultan Ahmed. She was twenty-six years old.

After the revolt and the ascension to the throne of her cousin Mahmud I, son of Mustafa II, her possessions and wealth were seized and she was exiled to the Old Çırağan Palace, because the government feared that she might act to put her father back on the throne.

== Charities ==
In 1727, Fatma Sultan commissioned a fountain near the Ibrahim Pasha Palace, which bears her name. In 1728, she also commissioned a fountain near the New Mosque in Üsküdar. During her lifetime she founded waqfs in the capital bequeathing mülk properties she had received from her father. Along with her husband, she also constructed a water network of twenty fountains. She had also constructed a primary school and library near the Şehzade Mosque.

She also commissioned a mosque known as "Fatma Sultan Mosque", located in Eminönü district in Istanbul, which was built in the place of Terzibaşı Piri Ağa Mosque. Nevşehirli Ibrahim Pasha commissioned a palace near this mosque, Fatma Sultan repaired the mosque and added from the land of her palace and built a large mosque.

Following her father's death, she donated the lands and the palaces that her father granted her in 1717, which she had given for charitable foundations.

== Death ==
Fatma Sultan died at the age of twenty-eight on 4 January 1733. She was buried in the mausoleum of Turhan Sultan in New Mosque, Istanbul.

== Issue ==
By her second marriage, Fatma Sultan had two sons and two daughters:

- Sultanzade Mehmed Pasha (1718 – 16 June 1778)
- Sultanzade Genç Mehmed Bey (March 1723 – 1737)
- Fatma Hanımsultan (? – 1765). She had a son, Mehmed Bey, who married Hatice Hanımsultan, daughter of Saliha Sultan, another daughter of Ahmed III.
- Hibetullah Hanımsultan (? – 1774)

== In popular culture ==
- In the 2012 Turkish historical television series Bir Zamanlar Osmanlı: Kıyam, Fatma Sultan is portrayed by Turkish actress Leyla Göksun.

== Sources ==
- Duindam, Jeroen; Artan, Tülay; Kunt, Metin (11 August 2011). Royal Courts in Dynastic States and Empires: A Global Perspective. BRILL. ISBN 978-9-004-20622-9.
- Sakaoğlu, Necdet (2008). Bu mülkün kadın sultanları: Vâlide sultanlar, hâtunlar, hasekiler, kadınefendiler, sultanefendiler. Oğlak Yayıncılık. ISBN 978-9-753-29623-6.
- Uluçay, Mustafa Çağatay (2011). Padişahların kadınları ve kızları. Ankara, Ötüken.
