= Atike Sultan =

Atike Sultan may refer to:

- Ayşe Atike Hanımsultan, daughter of Gevherhan Sultan
- Atike Sultan (daughter of Ahmed I) (1613–1674), Ottoman princess
- Atike Sultan (1646–1686), Ottoman princess, daughter of Sultan Ibrahim I
- Atike Sultan, Ottoman princess, daughter of Sultan Ahmed II
- Atike Sultan (daughter of Ahmed III) (1712–1738), Ottoman princess
