= Hatice Sultan (daughter of Ahmed III) =

Ottoman princess, daughter of Ahmed III and Rukiye Kadın

- Born: 27 September 1710; Topkapı Palace, Constantinople, Ottoman Empire
- Died: c. 1738 (aged 27–28); Kıbleli Palace, Istanbul, Ottoman Empire
- Burial: New Mosque, Istanbul
- Spouse: Hafız Ahmed Pasha (m. 1724; died 1730) Halil Ağa (m. 1730)
- Issue: Second marriage Sultanzade Süleyman Izzi Efendi
- Dynasty: Ottoman
- Father: Ahmed III
- Mother: Rukiye Kadın
- Religion: Sunni Islam

Hatice Sultan (Ottoman Turkish: خدیجه سلطان; 27 September 1710 – c. 1738) was an Ottoman princess, the daughter of Sultan Ahmed III and his consort Rukiye Kadın.

== Life ==
=== Birth ===
Hatice Sultan was born on 27 September 1710 in the Topkapı Palace. Her father was Sultan Ahmed III, and her mother was Rukiye Kadın.

=== Marriage ===
In 1724, her father betrothed her to Hafız Ahmed Pasha, a prominent provincial governor, the son of Çerkes Osman Pasha, a distinguished vezir, and a close companion of the Grand vizier Nevşehirli Damat Ibrahim Pasha. On 21 February 1724 the betrothal gifts presented by Hafız Ahmed Pasha were transported from the palace of the grand vizier to the Imperial Palace, and the marriage contract was concluded the same day. Her half-sisters Ümmügülsüm Sultan and Atike Sultan were also married the same day. Apparently Hafız Ahmed had not yet arrived from Sayda, so his marriage to Hatice was formalised in the presence of his proxy. Hafız Ahmed Pasha arrived four days later. On 6 March 1724, the trousseau of Hatice Sultan was transported from the Topkapı Palace through Ahırkapı Yolu to the Kıbleli Palace that had been assigned to her. Then on 9 March, the princess herself was taken to her palace.

Hatice was widowed in 1730, when her husband was killed in the Patrona Halil Rebellion, and her father was dethroned. She later married Halil Ağa and had a son.

== Charities ==
In 1728, and 1729, Hatice Sultan commissioned two fountains in Üsküdar. Another fountain was commissioned by her father in her honor.

== Death ==
Hatice Sultan died in 1738 in the Kıbleli Palace, and was buried in New Mosque, Istanbul.

== Issue ==
By her second marriage, Hatice Sultan had a son:

- Sultanzade Süleyman Izzi Efendi

== See also ==
- List of Ottoman princesses

== Sources ==
- Duindam, Jeroen; Artan, Tülay; Kunt, Metin (11 August 2011). Royal Courts in Dynastic States and Empires: A Global Perspective. BRILL. ISBN 978-9-004-20622-9.
- Sakaoğlu, Necdet (2008). Bu mülkün kadın sultanları: Vâlide sultanlar, hâtunlar, hasekiler, kadınefendiler, sultanefendiler. Oğlak Yayıncılık. ISBN 978-9-753-29623-6.
