= Tomb of Turhan Sultan =

Mausoleum of 5 Ottoman Sultans, at Fatih, İstanbul, Turkey

Coordinates: 41°00′58.2″N 28°58′18.8″E

- Turhan Sultan Türbesi
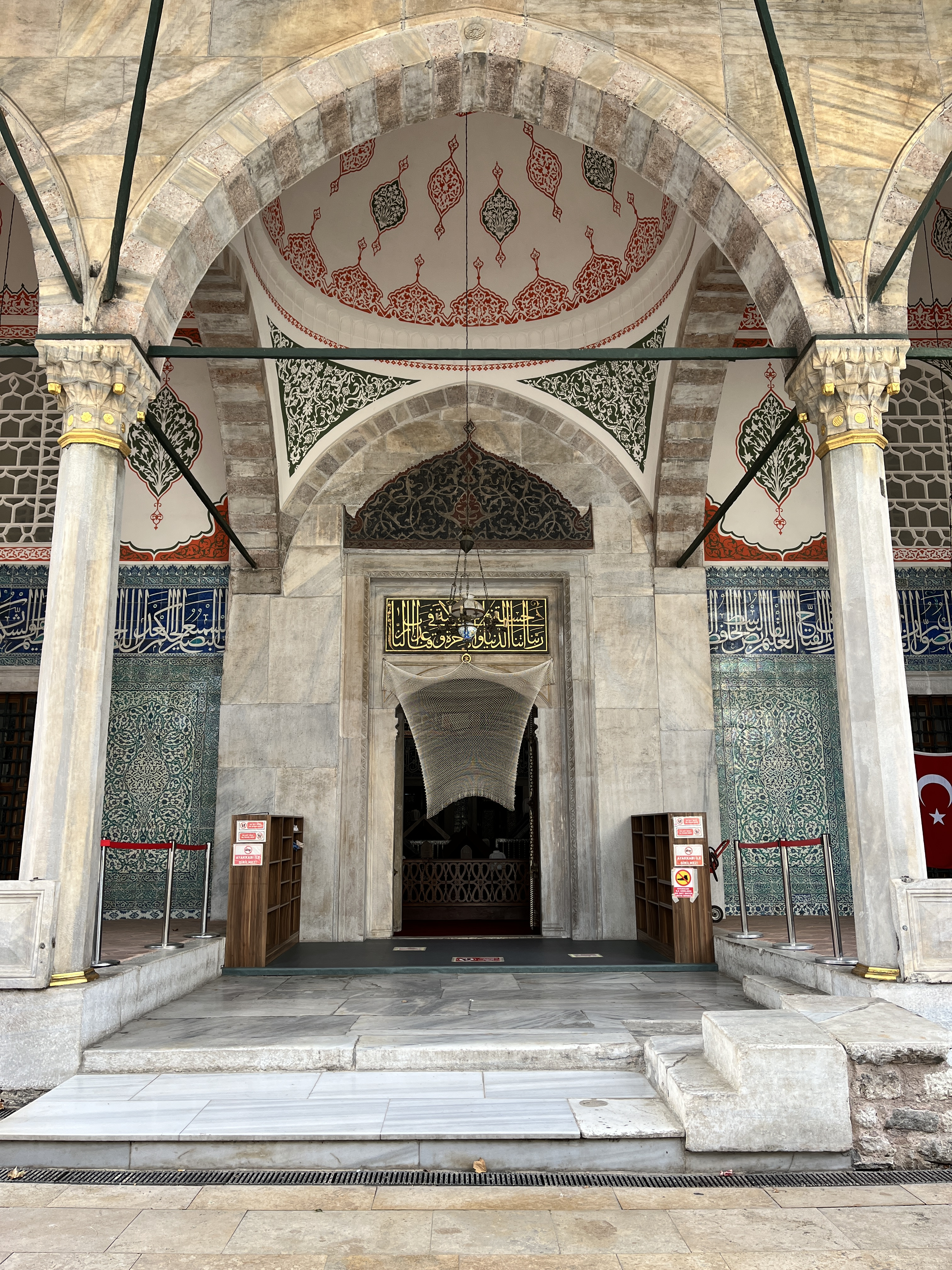
- Entrance to the Tomb of Turhan Sultan
- Interactive map of Tomb of Turhan Sultan
- Location: Fatih, Istanbul, Turkey
- Designer: Mustafa Agha
- Type: Mausoleum
- Material: Iznik tiles, mother-of-pearl inlaid woodwork
- Length: 15 metres (49 ft)
- Width: 15 metres (49 ft)
- Completion date: 1663
- Restored date: 1959
- Dedicated to: Turhan Sultan
- Graves: 44

The Tomb of Turhan Sultan (Turkish: Turhan Sultan Türbesi) is the mausoleum of five Ottoman sultans, located at Fatih in Istanbul, Turkey. It was built in 1663 for Turhan Sultan, first Haseki of Sultan Ibrahim and mother of Sultan Mehmed IV.

== Overview ==
The tomb is situated on the corner of Bankacılar St. and Yeni Cami St. in Eminönü quarter of Fatih in Istanbul. It was built in 1663 for Turhan Sultan (c. 1627–1683). She was the first Haseki Sultan of Sultan Ibrahim (reigned 1640–1648) and the mother and Valide Sultan of Sultan Mehmed IV (r. 1648–1687). The tomb was built as part of the New Mosque complex, of which construction was started in 1598 by Safiye Sultan (c. 1550 – c. 1619), the Haseki of Sultan Murad III (r. 1574–1595), the Valide Sultan of Sultan Mehmed III (r. 1595–1603) as well as the grandmother of Sultans Ahmed I (r. 1603–1617) and Mustafa I (r. 1617–1618, 1622–1623), and completed by Turhan Hatice Sultan in 1665. The tomb contains 44 graves in total. In addition to Turhan Sultan, five sultans, Mehmed IV, Mustafa II (r. 1695–1703), Ahmed III (r. 1703–1730), Mahmud I (r. 1730–1754) and Osman III (r. 1754–1757), rest in the tomb. Other notables are Şehzades and Sultanas, namely princes, princesses, and Kadın (consorts) as relatives of the sultans.

== Architecture ==
The tomb was built by court architect Mustafa Agha. It was designed in square-plan having a porch of the size 15 m × 15 m (49 ft × 49 ft) in front of its entrance gate. The porch's dome is carried by pendant vaults and arched vaults built with interchangeably white and red stones. The porch is decorated with tiles and carvings. The rectangular panels on the porch walls contain each a red and pale green rosette on white ground. The panels have decorative fillings on the corners. On the right side of the gate, an inscription reads literally "Oh! my Allah, who opens the doors, open auspicial doors to us".

Windows in two rows around the building, with exception on the porch side, bring light inside the tomb. The lower row windows are rectangular and are barred while the upper row windows have pointed-arch design. The tomb's interior is decorated with Iznik tiles and carvings. The original decorations on the walls and at the dome interior were recovered during the restoration works in 1959. In the 19th and 20th centuries, some carvings were added as copies of the original ones in the medallions and rosettes. A tile belt surrounding the interior contains the inscription of the 1st-30th āyāt of the Quranic surah Al-Mulk. An inscription in two lines of Taʿlīq script was attached into the western wall of the tomb during the burial of Sultan Mehmed IV. Sultan Ahmed III built a library on the right side of the porch. In later years, two more tombs, named "Havatin" and "Cedid Havatin", were built next to the tomb.
