= Dilhayât Kalfa =

Ottoman singer

- Born: c. 1710; Constantinople, Ottoman Empire (?)
- Died: c. 1780 (aged 69-70) Constantinople, Ottoman Empire
- Instrument: Tambur

Dilhayât Kalfa (c. 1710 - c. 1780) was a musician, singer, and composer at the Ottoman court. She is regarded as the most significant female composer in the history of Ottoman music. Her title kalfa indicates that she was an enslaved woman with a relatively high status at the court. In particular, she was the housekeeper of Sultan Ahmed III's harem. A singer and tanbûr player, she composed over a hundred pieces for voice and instrument, 12 of which survive today.

== Life ==
Dilhayât Kalfa is thought to have been born in 1710 in Constantinople. Her title kalfa indicates that she was an enslaved woman with a relatively high status at the court. In particular, she was the housekeeper of Sultan Ahmed III's harem. She likely received her musical education at the Ottoman court. A singer, composer and tanbûr player, she composed over a hundred pieces for voice and instrument, 12 of which survive today. Despite the fact that few of her compositions survive, Kalfa is regarded as the most significant female composer in the history of Ottoman music. Her works are "among the most important examples of the technique and aesthetic of the Ottoman classical school".

Cohen records Dilhayât as having died in 1780, whilst others report a much earlier death. In 1999 a document was discovered by Talip Mert that listed her effects at death. The document is dated to before April 1740. Tradition holds that Dilhayât Kalfa was the teacher of Selim III, but as he was born in 1761, she did not overlap with him if she died in late 1730s.
