= Saliha Sultan (daughter of Ahmed III) =

Daughter of Ahmed III

- Born: 21 March 1715; Edirne Palace, Edirne, Ottoman Empire
- Died: 11 October 1778 (aged 63); Constantinople, Ottoman Empire
- Burial: Eyüp Cemetery, Istanbul, Turkey
- Spouse: Sari Mustafa Pasha (m. 1728; died 1731); Sarhoş Ali Pasha (m. 1740; died 1744); Hatibzade Yahya Pasha (m. 1745; died 1755); Koca Ragıp Mehmed Pasha (m. 1758; died 1763); Turşu Mehmed Pasha (m. 1764; died 1770)
- Issue: First marriage; Sultanzade Ahmed Bey; Fatma Hanımsultan; Unknown marriages; Ayşe Hanımsultan; Emine Hanımsultan; Hatice Hanımsultan
Names
- Saliha binti Ahmed Han
- Dynasty: Ottoman
- Father: Ahmed III
- Mother: Hatem Kadın
- Religion: Sunni Islam

Saliha Sultan (Ottoman Turkish: صالحہ سلطان; "the devotous one" 21 March 1715 – 11 October 1778) was an Ottoman princess, the daughter of Sultan Ahmed III, and his consort Hatem Kadın. She had a twin brother, Şehzade Selim, who died in infancy. She was the half-sister of Sultans Mustafa III and Abdul Hamid I.

== Life ==
=== Birth ===
Saliha Sultan was born on 21 March 1715 at the Edirne Palace. Her father was Sultan Ahmed III, and her mother was one of his consorts, Hatem Kadın. She had a twin brother named Şehzade Selim, who died in infancy, on February 1718.

=== Marriages ===
On 25 May 1728, at the age of thirteen, her father betrothed her to Sari Mustafa Pasha, son of Gazi Deli Husein Pasha. The marriage took place three days later on 28 May. Her dowry was 10,000 ducats. On the same day she and her trousseau were taken to her palace located in Eyüp. The two together had at least a son and a daughter. She was widowed at his death in 1731.

On 30 June 1740, during the reign of her cousin Sultan Mahmud I, she married Sarhoş Ali Pasha, son of Abdi Pasha. She was widowed at his death in 1744. After Ali Pasha's death, she married Hatibzade Yahya Pasha. She was widowed at his death in 1755.

Three years later, on 6 April 1758, during the reign of her brother Sultan Mustafa III, she married Grand Vizier Koca Ragıp Pasha, when she was forty three, and Ragıp Pasha was sixty one years old. She was widowed at his death in 1763. On 9 May 1764, she married Vezir Turşu Mehmed Pasha, who had formerly served as the agha of the janissaries, and Kapudan Pasha. She was widowed at his death in 1770.

== Death ==
Saliha Sultan died on 11 October 1778 in Bahariye Palace in Eyüp at the age of sixty-three, and was buried in Eyüp cemetery, Istanbul. After her death, her goods were captured by the treasury. Her houses and plots were assigned to Esma Sultan.

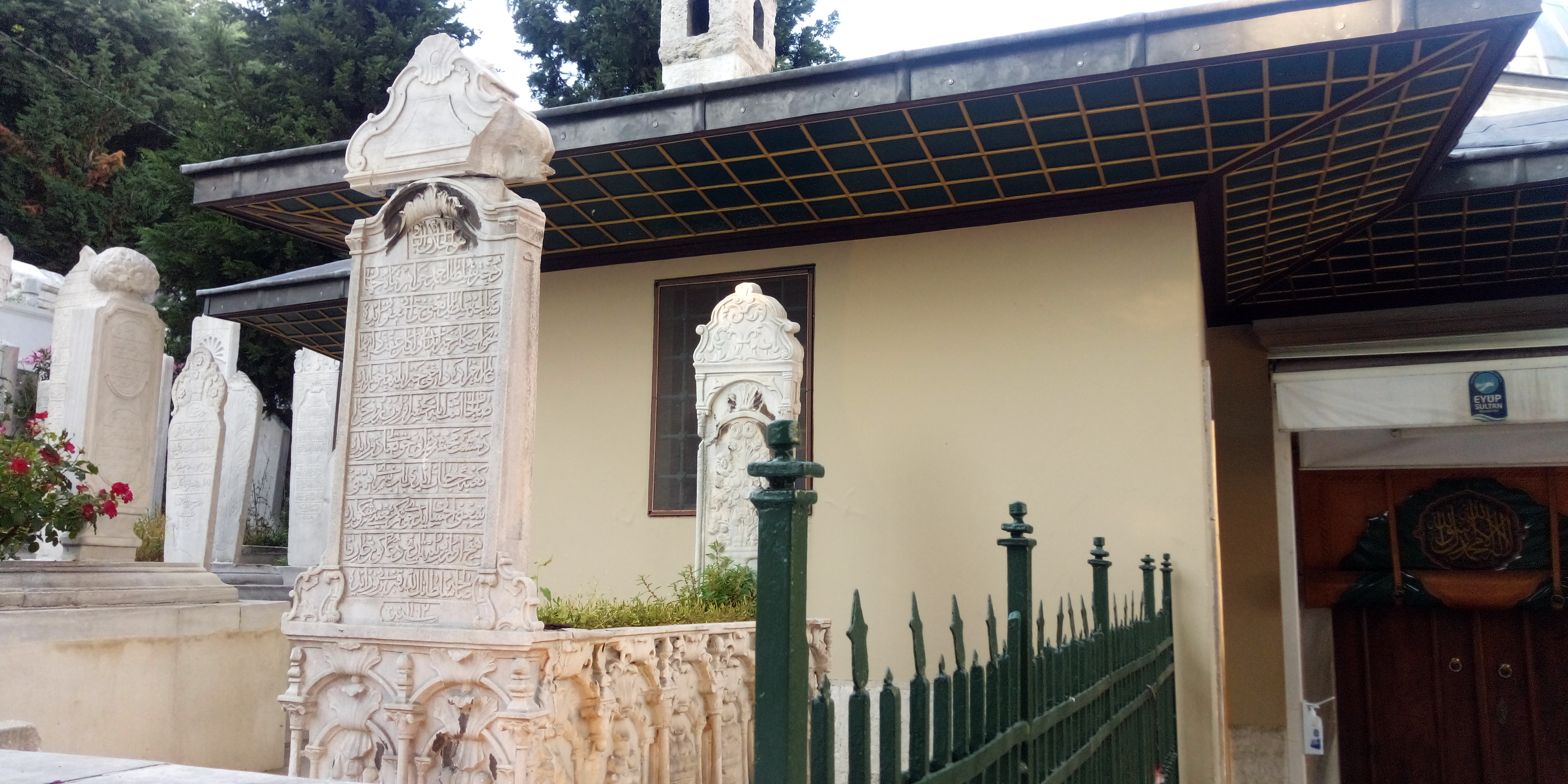
Tombstone of Saliha Sultan at Eyüp Sultan Mosque Cemetery

== Issue ==
Saliha Sultan had a son and four daughters.

By her first marriage, Saliha Sultan had at least a son and a daughter:

- Sultanzade Ahmed Bey (1729 - 1736);
- Fatma Hanımsultan, married in 1748 to Ibrahim Bey, brother of Hatibzade Yahya Pasha;

Saliha Sultan had also other three daughters, but it is not known from which marriages they were born:

- Ayşe Hanımsultan (died in 1754, buried in Eyüp cemetery);.
- Emine Hanımsultan (died 12 May 1783, buried in Eyüp cemetery).
- Hatice Hanımsultan, married Mehmed Bey, son of Fatma Hanımsultan, daughter of Fatma Sultan.

== Sources ==
- Davis, Fanny (1986). The Ottoman Lady: A Social History from 1718 to 1918. Greenwood Publishing Group. ISBN 978-0-313-24811-5.
- Güngör, Tahir (2014). Vak'a-nüvîs Hâkim Efendi Tarihi (Metin ve Tahlil).
- Sakaoğlu, Necdet (2008). Bu mülkün kadın sultanları: Vâlide sultanlar, hâtunlar, hasekiler, kadınefendiler, sultanefendiler. Oğlak Yayıncılık. ISBN 978-9-753-29623-6.
- Uluçay, Mustafa Çağatay (2011). Padişahların kadınları ve kızları. Ankara, Ötüken.
