= Mahmud I =

Sultan of the Ottoman Empire from 1730 to 1754

- Custodian of the Two Holy Mosques; Sultan of the two lands, Khagan of the two seas
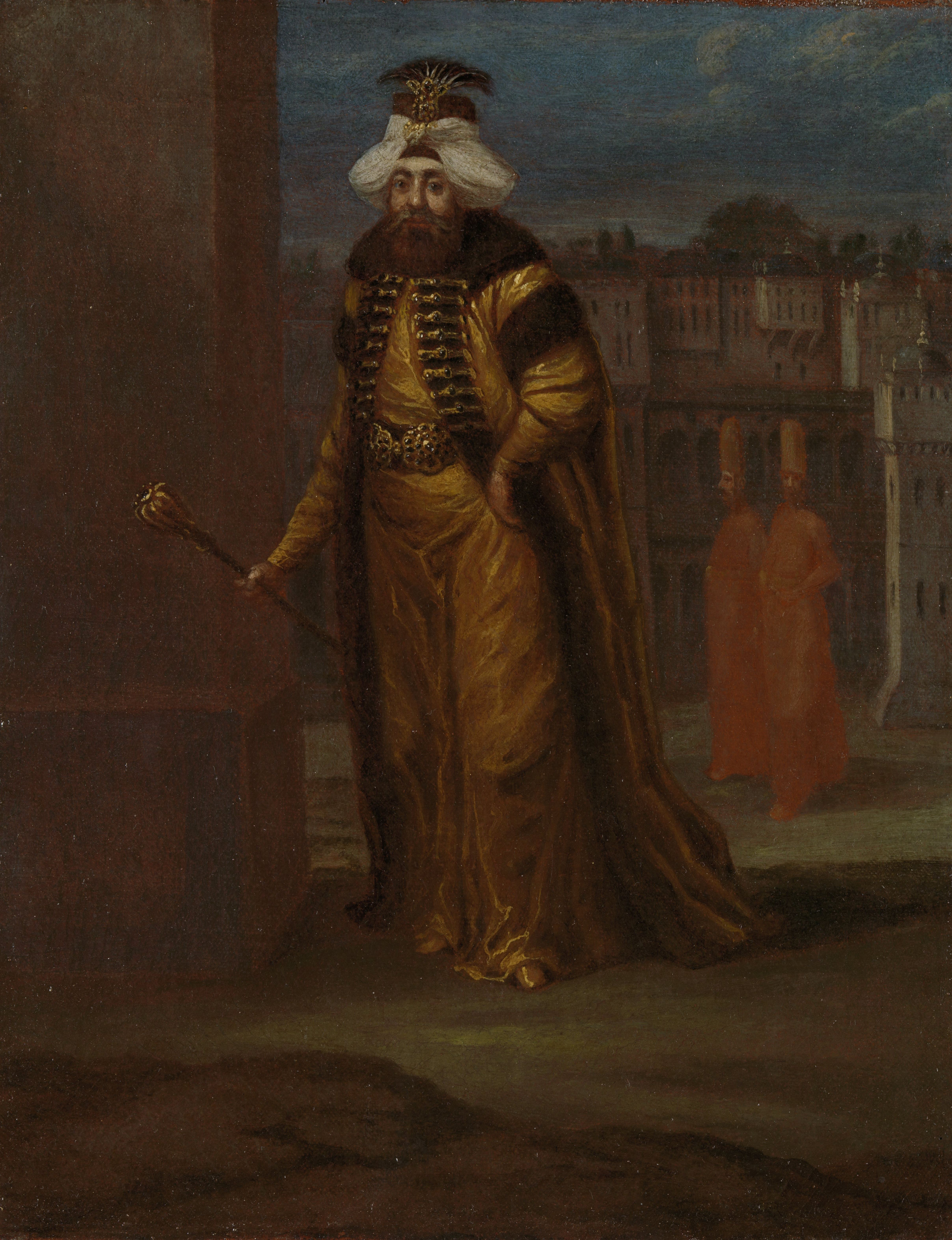
- Portrait by Jean Baptiste Vanmour

Sultan of the Ottoman Empire (Padishah)
- Reign: 1 October 1730 – 13 December 1754
- Predecessor: Ahmed III
- Successor: Osman III

Ottoman Caliph (Amir al-Mu'minin)
- Predecessor: Ahmed III
- Successor: Osman III
- Born: 2 August 1696; Edirne Palace, Edirne, Ottoman Empire
- Died: 13 December 1754 (aged 58); Topkapı Palace, Constantinople, Ottoman Empire
- Burial: Tomb of Turhan Sultan, New Mosque, Istanbul, Turkey
- Consorts: Ayşe Kadın; Hatem Kadın; Alicenab Kadın; Verdinaz Kadın; Hatice Rami Kadın; Tiryal Kadın; Raziye Kadın; Meyyase Hanim; Fehmi Hanim; Sirri Hanim; Habbabe Hanim
Names
- Mahmud bin Mustafa
- Dynasty: Ottoman
- Father: Mustafa II
- Mother: Saliha Sultan
- Religion: Sunni Islam
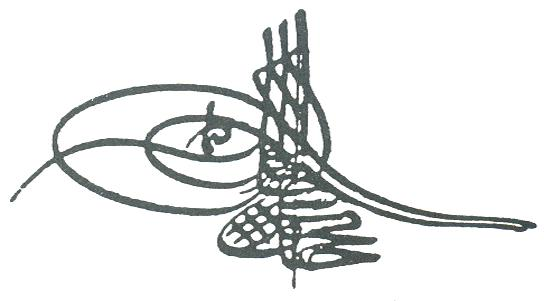
- Tughra

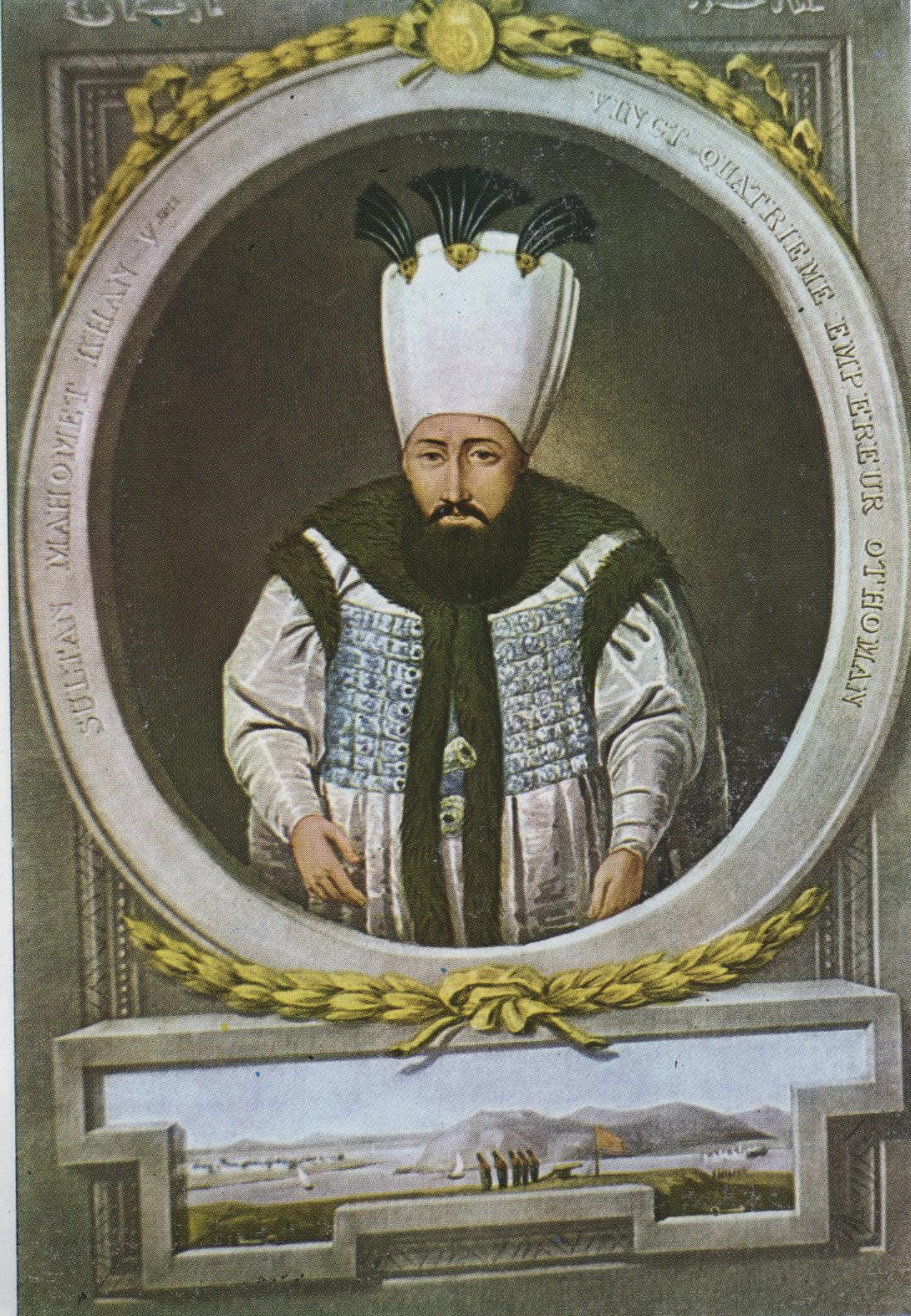
Sultan Mahmud I

Mahmud I (Ottoman Turkish: محمود اول, Turkish: I. Mahmud; 2 August 1696 – 13 December 1754), known as Mahmud the Hunchback, was the sultan of the Ottoman Empire from 1730 to 1754. He took over the throne after the quelling of the Patrona Halil rebellion. His reign was marked by wars in Persia and conflicts in Europe. He delegated government affairs to his viziers and devoted time to writing poetry. Nader Shah's devastating campaign weakened the Mughal Empire and created the opportunity for Mahmud I to initiate war with cooperation from Muhammad Shah. The alliance ended with the latter's death, leading to tensions between the Afsharids and the Ottomans. In 1748, he outlawed Freemasonry within the Ottoman Empire.

== Early life ==
He was born at Edirne Palace on 2 August 1696, the son of Mustafa II (1664–1703); his mother was Saliha Sultan. Mahmud I was the older half-brother of Osman III (1754–57). He developed a humped back.

His father Mustafa II mostly lived in Edirne. Mahmud passed his childhood in Edirne. On 18 May 1702 he started his education in Edirne. When his father was deposed, he was brought to Istanbul and locked up in the Kafes where he spent 27 years of his life.

It is not known what kind of culture he acquired during this time, since he continued to play chess, write poetry, and deal with music. In addition for childhood and youth, there were dangers, especially for the Kafes life.

== Reign ==
=== Accession ===
On 28 September 1730, Patrona Halil with a small group of fellow Janissaries aroused some of the citizens of Constantinople who opposed the reforms of Ahmed III. Sweeping up more soldiers Halil led the riot to the Topkapı Palace and demanded the death of the grand vizer, Nevşehirli Damat İbrahim Pasha and the abdication of Ahmed III. Ahmed III acceded to the demands, had İbrahim Pasha strangled, and agreed to his nephew, Mahmud, becoming sultan.

Mahmud's real reign began on 25 November 1730, after this incident. First of all, Istanbul was taken under strict control. Measures were taken. About two thousand suspicious people were captured, some were executed, some were exiled.

=== Mahmud's rule ===
Mahmud I was recognized as sultan by the mutineers as well as by court officials but for some weeks after his accession the empire was in the hands of the insurgents. Halil rode with the new sultan to the Mosque of Eyüb where the ceremony of girding Mahmud I with the Sword of Osman was performed; many of the chief officers were deposed and successors to them appointed at the dictation of the bold rebel who had served in the ranks of the Janissaries and who appeared before the sultan bare-legged and in his old uniform of a common soldier. A Greek butcher, named Yanaki, had formerly given credit to Halil and had lent him money during the three days of the insurrection. Halil showed his gratitude by compelling the Divan to make Yanaki Hospodar of Moldavia. However, Yanaki never took charge of this office.

The Khan of the Crimea assisted the Grand Vizier, the Mufti and the Aga of the Janissaries in putting down the rebellion. On 24 November 1731, Halil was strangled by the sultan's order and in his presence, after a Divan in which Halil had dictated that war be declared against Russia. His Greek friend, Yanaki, and 7,000 of those who had supported him were also put to death. The jealousy which the officers of the Janissaries felt towards Halil, and their readiness to aid in his destruction, facilitated the exertions of Mahmud I's supporters in putting an end to the rebellion after it had lasted over a year.

The Austrian ambassador, who came to Istanbul in August 1740, was given a dinner in Davudpaşa. Çavuşbaşı took the ambassador and took him to his mansion prepared in Beyoğlu. On the day of the Ulufe Court, he presented his name to the Sultan. Various demonstrations were held in places where welcome and farewell ceremonies were held for the ambassador from Yeniköy Pier.

The rest of Mahmud I's reign was dominated by wars in Persia, with the collapsing Safavid dynasty and the ascendance of Nader Shah. Mahmud also faced a notable war in Europe—the Austro-Russian-Turkish War (1735–1739).

After the condemnation of Freemasonry by Pope Clement XII in 1738, he followed suit outlawing the organization and since that time Freemasonry has been equated with atheism in the Ottoman Empire and the broader Islamic world.

Mahmud I entrusted government to his viziers and spent much of his time composing poetry.

=== Fires of 1750 ===
The fire that started at the Ayazma gate in January 1750 lasted for 19 hours. Numerous shops, houses, and mansions burned until the fire reached Vefa district. The sultan dismissed Boynueğri Abdullah Pasha and appointed Divitdar Mehmed Emin Pasha on 9 January 1750. In the second fire that broke out on 31 March 1750, Bitpazan, Abacılar, Yorgancılar, Yağlıkcılar, and Haffaflar were completely burned. The fire spread to Fingerkapi and Tatlikuyu. The sultan, with the help of the treasury, restored the burned down areas.

=== Architecture and construction under him ===
Mahmud I started construction of the Cağaloğlu Bath, called Yeni Hamam, in the spring of 1740 on the site of Cağaloğlu Palace, which covers a large area. Foundation houses were built on the remaining empty lands and a neighborhood was established. The sultan opened the one in the courtyard of the Hagia Sophia Mosque, the first of the three libraries it established in Istanbul, with a ceremony and made 4,000 volumes. In the library, Sahih-i Buharf reading of ten inhabitants every day was one of the conditions of the foundation. Mahmud also came to the Rosary Gate of Hagia Sophia several times, sat in the library and listened to the commentary of tafsir. The famine, which appeared due to the heavy winter, became increasingly heavier at the end of spring.

== Foreign relations ==
=== Relations with the Mughal Empire ===
Nader Shah's devastating campaign against the Mughal Empire, created a void in the western frontiers of Persia, which was effectively exploited by the Ottoman Sultan Mahmud I, who initiated the Ottoman–Persian War (1743–46), in which the Mughal Emperor Muhammad Shah closely cooperated with the Ottomans and their ambassador Haji Yusuf Agha, these relations between the two empires continued until Muhammad Shah's death in 1748.

=== Relations with Afsharid Empire ===
In March 1741, the ambassador of Nadir Shah from Iran’s government, Hacı Han, came to Istanbul with 3,000 people and his guards unit to prolong the peace between them. Among his gifts were fabrics embroidered with jewels, ten elephants, and valuable weapons. Hacı Han was given a banquet in Fener Bahçesin. It was also a problem to pass the elephants brought by hand to Istanbul, and wide shakes were laid on the barges, so wooden curtains were laid around them so that elephants could not be scared.

The relations between the Afsharid Empire and Ottoman Empire became increasingly tense, reached a new dimension in February 1743, and Shah Safi, who was one of Shah Hussein's princes and held hostage on Chios, was condemned and led to Nader Shah's inability to complete. He was sent to the Afsharid border with the troops that joined him.

== Death ==
Mahmud I was disturbed by fistula and during the harsh winter his health declined day by day. On Friday, 13 December 1754 he went for attending the Friday prayer. After attending the prayer he went back to his palace but in the journey he collapsed on his horse and died on the same day and was buried in his great-grandmother Turhan Sultan Mausoleum in New Mosque, at Eminönü, in Istanbul, Turkey.

== Family ==
There are eleven known consorts of Mahmud I, but he had no children by any of them (just as his heir, his younger half-brother Osman III, who also remained childless), despite a reign of twenty-four years. This is why Sakaoğlu, a Turkish historian, speculates that Mahmud may have been castrated during his years of imprisonment in Kafes.

The known consorts of Mahmud I are:

- Hace Ayşe Kadın. BaşKadin (first consort) until her death. (Note: However, according to Oztüna, Alicenab was instead the BaşKadin, while Ayşe was the second Kadın.) She built a school in Çörekçikapısı, near the Fatih Mosque. The name Hace indicated that she had made the pilgrimage to Mecca by proxy. She died in 1746.
- Hatem Kadın. BaşKadin from the death of Ayşe Kadın in 1746 until the death of Mahmud I in 1754. (Note: However, according to Oztüna, Alicenab Kadın was instead the BaşKadin for the whole reign of Mahmud I and not Ayşe and Hatem therefore never obtained this title.) She died in 1769 and was buried in the Ayazma mosque in Üsküdar.
- Hace Alicenab Kadın. (Note: However, according to Oztüna, she was instead Mahmud I's BaşKadin throughout his reign, with Ayşe second consort.) She built schools and fountains in the Fatih neighborhood. The name Hace indicated that she had made the pilgrimage to Mecca by proxy. She died in 1775 and was buried in Yeni Cami.
- Hace Verdinaz Kadın. She built a school and a fountain in Murâdpaşa and another fountain in Galata. The name Hace indicated that she had made the pilgrimage to Mecca by proxy. She died on 16 December 1804, and was buried in Şehzâdebaşı. Her late death date suggests that she was one of the youngest consorts.
- Hatice Rami Kadın. She built a school and a fountain in Beşiktaş. A year after Mahmud I's death in 1755, she married Inspector Haremeyn Mustafapaşazade İbrahim Bey. She died on 16 January 1780.
- Tiryal Kadın, who died between 1785 and 1789.
- Raziye Kadın
- Meyyase Hanim
- Fehmi Hanim
- Sirri Hanim
- Habbabe Hanim

== Notes ==
Mahmud I House of Osman Born: 2 August 1696 Died: 13 December 1754[aged 58]
Regnal titles
Preceded by Ahmed III	Sultan of the Ottoman Empire; 20 Sep 1730 – 13 Dec 1754	Succeeded by Osman III
Sunni Islam titles
Preceded by Ahmed III	Caliph of the Ottoman Caliphate; 20 Sep 1730 – 13 Dec 1754	Succeeded by Osman III
