= Atike Sultan (daughter of Ahmed III) =

Ottoman princess, daughter of Ahmed III

- Born: 29 March 1712; Topkapı Palace, Constantinople, Ottoman Empire
- Died: 2 April 1737 (aged 25); Cağaloğlu Palace, Istanbul, Ottoman Empire
- Burial: Mausoleum of Turhan Sultan, New Mosque, Istanbul
- Spouse: Nevşehirli Mehmed Pasha (m. 1724)
Names
- Turkish: Atike Sultan; Ottoman Turkish: عتیقه سلطان
- Dynasty: Ottoman
- Father: Ahmed III
- Religion: Sunni Islam

Atike Sultan (Ottoman Turkish: عتیقه سلطان; 29 March 1712 – 2 April 1737) was an Ottoman princess, the daughter of Sultan Ahmed III. She was a half-sister of Mustafa III and Abdul Hamid I.

== Life ==
=== Birth ===
Atike Sultan was born on 29 March 1712 in the Topkapı Palace. Her father was Sultan Ahmed III.

=== Marriage ===
On 6 January 1724, her father betrothed her to Mehmed Pasha, the son of Grand Vizier Nevşehirli Damat Ibrahim Pasha and his first wife. On 21 February 1724 the betrothal gifts presented by Mehmed Pasha were transported from the palace of the grand vezir to the Imperial Palace, and the marriage contract was concluded the same day. On the same day, her half-sisters Ümmügülsüm Sultan and Hatice Sultan were also married. Ten days later, on 13 March, Atike's trousseau, and on 16 March Atike Sultan herself were transported from the Topkapı Palace to her palace at Cağaloğlu Palace, located on the Divanyolu street.

=== Charity ===
In 1728–29, Atike's father commissioned a fountain in Üsküdar in her name.

== Death ==
Atike Sultan died on 2 April 1737 at the age of twenty five in the Çağaloğlu Palace, and was buried in New Mosque, Istanbul.

== Sources ==
- Duindam, Jeroen; Artan, Tülay; Kunt, Metin (11 August 2011). Royal Courts in Dynastic States and Empires: A Global Perspective. BRILL. ISBN 978-9-004-20622-9.
- Sakaoğlu, Necdet (2008). Bu mülkün kadın sultanları: Vâlide sultanlar, hâtunlar, hasekiler, kadınefendiler, sultanefendiler. Oğlak Yayıncılık. ISBN 978-9-753-29623-6.
- Haskan, Mehmet Nermi (2001). Yüzyıllar boyunca Üsküdar - Volume 3. Üsküdar Belediyesi. p. 1332. ISBN 978-9-759-76063-2.
