= Nevşehirli Damat Ibrahim Pasha =

Grand Vizier of the Ottoman Empire from 1718 to 1730

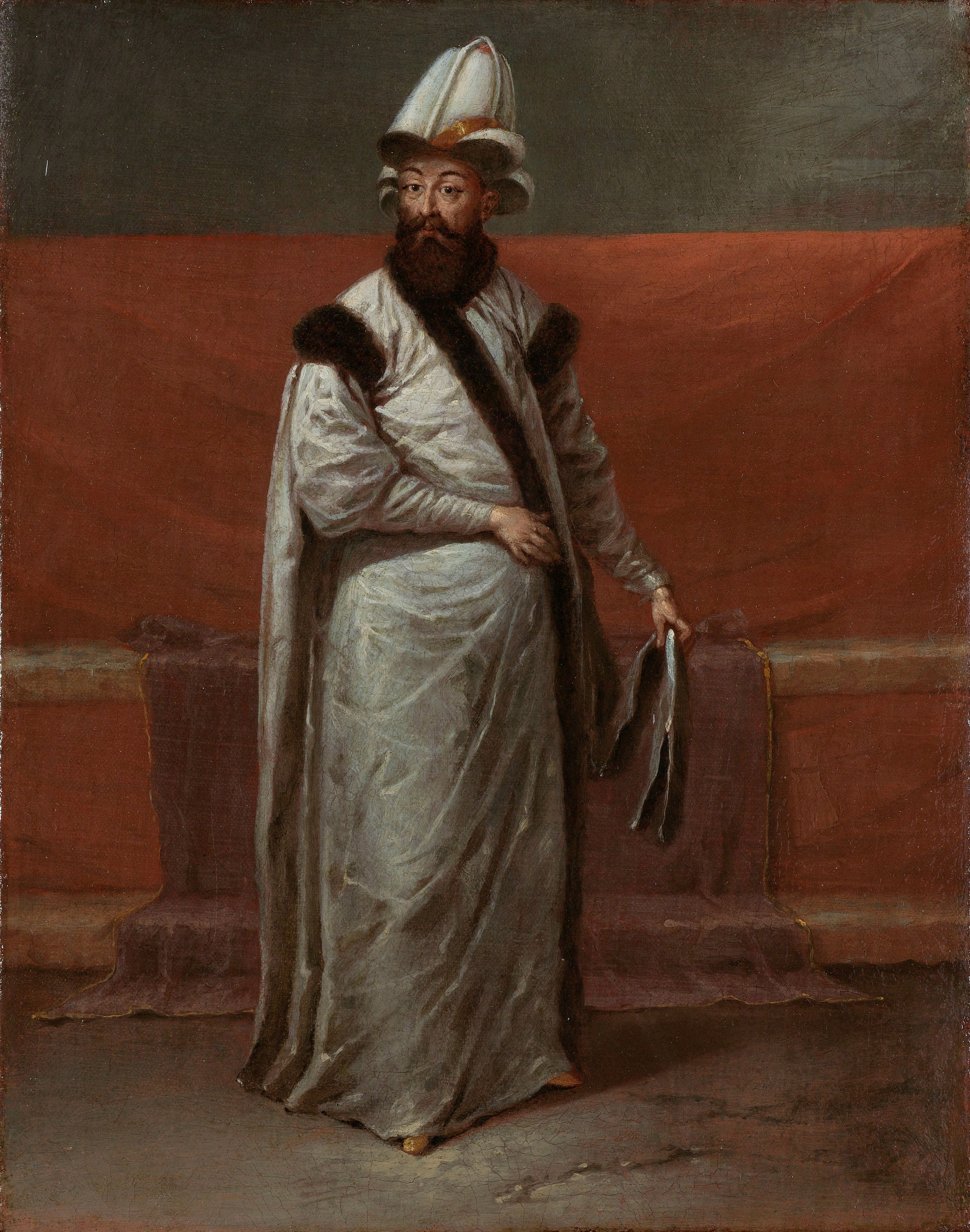

Grand Vizier of the Ottoman Empire
- In office 9 May 1718 – 1 October 1730
- Monarch: Ahmed III
- Preceded by: Nişancı Mehmet Pasha
- Succeeded by: Silahdar Damat Mehmed Pasha

Personal details
- Born: 1662 Nevşehir
- Died: 1 October 1730 (aged 67–68) Constantinople, Ottoman Empire (present-day Istanbul, Turkey)
- Spouse(s): Fülane Hatun Fatma Sultan (m. 1717)
- Children: First marriage Nevşehirli Mehmed Bey; Second marriage Sultanzade Mehmed Paşah; Sultanzade Genç Mehmed Bey; Fatma Hanımsultan; Hibetullah Hanımsultan
- Parent(s): Ali Ağa; Fatma Hanım

Nevşehirli Damat Ibrahim Pasha (Ottoman Turkish: نوشہرلی داماد ابراہیم پاشا c. 1662 – 1 October 1730) served as Grand Vizier for Sultan Ahmed III of the Ottoman Empire during the Tulip period. He was also the head of a ruling family which had great influence in the court of Ahmed III.

== Early life ==
He was born in Nevşehir (formerly Muşkara) in 1662, to Sipahi Ali Aga, the voivode of Izdin, and Fatma Hanım. In 1689 he went to Istanbul, to see his relatives and to find a job.

== Achievements ==
The abilities of Ibrahim, who directed the government from 1718 to 1730, preserved an unusual internal peace in the empire, though the frontier provinces were often the scenes of disorder and revolt. This was repeatedly the case in Egypt and Arabia, and still more frequently in the districts northward and eastward of the Black Sea, especially among the fierce Noghai tribes of the Kuban. The state of the countries between the Black Sea and the Caspian Sea was rendered still more unstable by the rival claims of Russia and the Porte; it was difficult to define a boundary between the two empires in pursuance of the partition treaty of 1723.

The Tulip period, called Lâle Devri (the Tulip epoch), was a time of extravagant garden parties and sumptuous entertainment. In 1730, when Tahmasp II of the Safavid dynasty attacked Ottoman possessions, the empire's leadership was caught unprepared. Infuriated by Ibrahim Pasha's apparent indifference to state affairs and by the sultan's life of inordinate luxury—'which was rendered the more distasteful to his subjects by its faintly European flavor'—and by his hesitation in taking up the Safavid challenge, the people and troops in Constantinople revolted. They were led by Patrona Halil, an ex-Janissary from Macedonia. Ahmed III sacrificed Ibrahim and other viziers to the mob in order to save himself.

Sultan Ahmed III did not leave İbrâhim Efendi next to him. He promoted himself quickly and brought rickah-i humayun to the district governor with his wife. Thus, Ibrahim Pasha, who was a damâd-i nocturnal, remained with the sultan in Istanbul as the district governor with the rank of second vizier during the Austrian campaigns (1717–1718). Meanwhile, the steadfastness did not accept offers; He declined to lead the government of a state at war. During the meeting of the armistice that will end the war with Austria and Venice, He accepted Ahmed's offer of grand vizier. Unlike the other grand viziers, Ahmed gave his daughter's groom the emerald seal of the Tuğra, which he used, as the “seal of humor”.

İbrâhim Pasha first discussed the peace talks with Austria that will end the war. He wrote a letter to the Austrian applicant on peace; He also sent instructions to the Ottoman delegates. He left the army and left Edirne in order to be prepared for the possibility that peace talks would not result. He remained in Sofia until he got the result of peace. Meanwhile, Austria has aggravated the peace conditions and Turkish delegates were mistreated and interim meetings were interrupted. However, through the ambassadors of the UK and the Netherlands. According to this treaty, Small Wallachia, Timişoara, Belgrade, Northern Serbia were left to Austria. Mora was taken from the Venetians and given back to the Ottoman State.

== Letter of Farrukhsiyar ==
The Mughal Emperor Farrukhsiyar, a great-grandson of Aurangzeb, is also known to have sent a letter to the Ottomans which was received by the Grand Vizier Ibrahim Pasha, providing a graphic description informing him of the efforts of the Mughal commander Syed Hassan Ali Khan Barha against the Rajput and Maratha rebellion.

== Marriage and descendants ==
Ibrahim Pasha was married to the daughter of the sultan, Fatma Sultan, in 1717 when the princess was fourteen and Ibrahim was fifty. This marriage into the Ottoman dynasty earned him the epithet "Damat" (Turkish: bridegroom, son-in-law). He was earlier married to another woman, whom he divorced to marry Fatma. From this previous marriage, he had at least one son, Nevşehirli Mehmed Bey, who married Atike Sultan, a half-sister of Fatma.

Ibrahim and Fatma had two sons and two daughters:

- Sultanzade Mehmed Pasha (1718? – 16 June 1778)
- Sultanzade Genç Mehmed Bey (March 1723 – 1737)
- Fatma Hanımsultan (?–1765). She had a son, Mehmed Bey, who married Hatice Hanımsultan, daughter of Saliha Sultan, another daughter of Ahmed III.
- Hibetullah Hanımsultan (?–1774)

== Character ==
İbrâhim Pasha was a supporter of innovation and was keen on history and fine arts. He also learned from the works of the painter Ömer Efendi.

The translations made by Yanyalı Esad Efendi from Aristotle are dedicated to İbrâhim Pasha. A thirty-two people delegation consisting of scholars and scribes, which can be considered as the academy of the period, was established in Istanbul in 1725 during the period of his tradition.

== Architecture ==
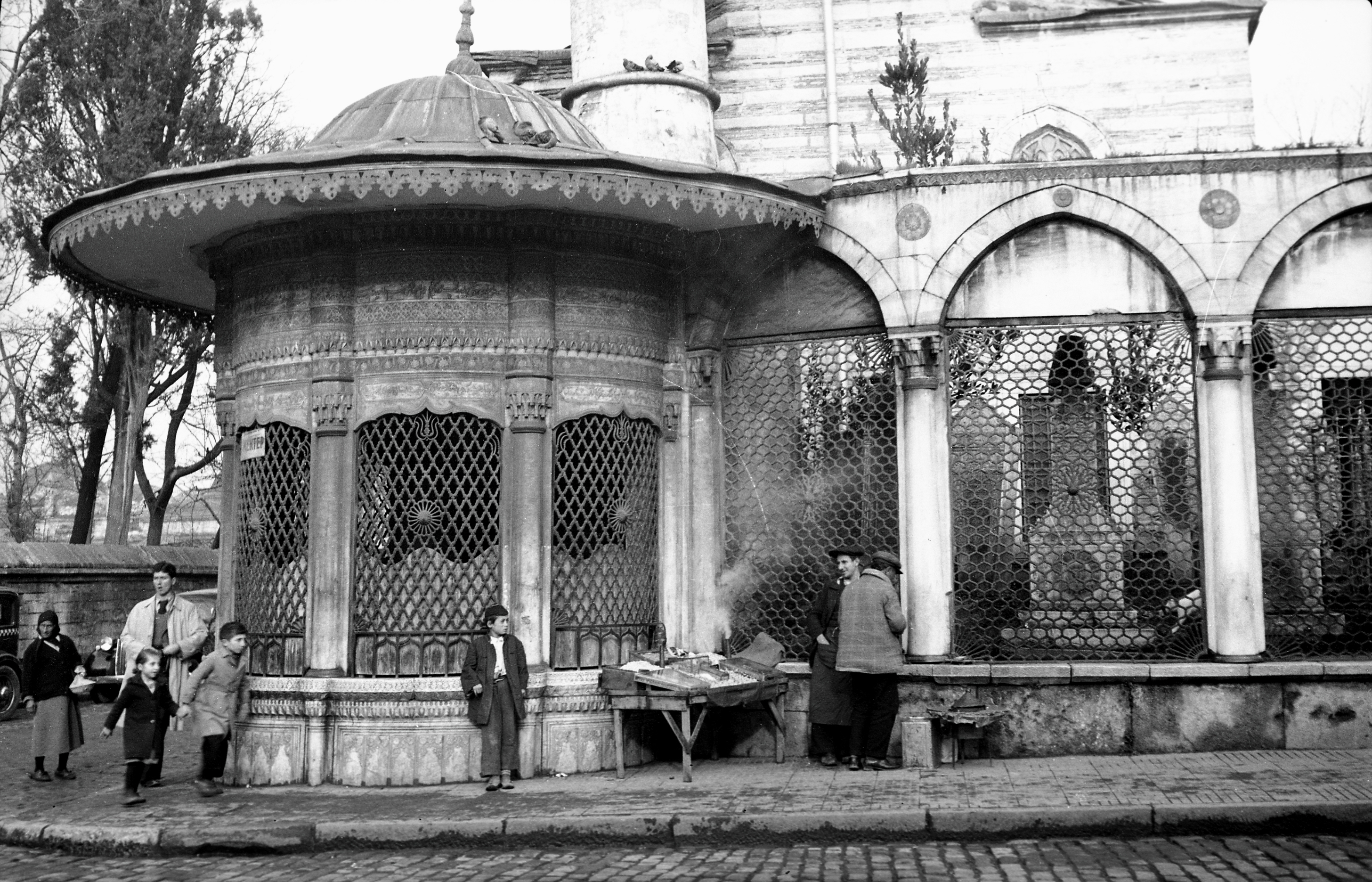
Ibrahim Pasha Complex

Ibrâhim Pasha left many charity works. The most important of these are the mosque, madrasa, classroom, school, fountain, public bath, inn and double bath in Nevşehir, and the Dardanhadis Masjid, the fountain, the library and the source of their income, built together with his wife Fatma Sultan in Şehzadebaşı. Masjid.

Apart from these, a mosque in Sâdâbâd, a mansion next to Beşiktaş Mevlevi in the Çırağan area in Beşiktaş, next to the Orta Mosque in Yeniodalar in Istanbul and in Sultanahmet and Yalıköy, in Kuruçeşme, and in Bahariye. In addition, there were fountains, a public fountain and pools around Mîrâhur Köşkü and Eyüp, in Şemsipaşa in Üsküdar, around Malatyalı Mosque in Üsküdar, near Çubuklu Mosque and Mesire Fountain in Feyzâbâd. There were about ten fountains in Ürgüp and a bazaar known as the Egyptian Bazaar by the sea in İzmir. There were also foundation vineyards and gardens in Antalya, Rumelia and Islands.

This complex of Nevşehirli Damad İbrâhim Pasha is a unique architectural work. It is also of historical importance. It is one of the last structures of the classical period of Turkish art among small complexes. In addition, the plan arrangement of the complex consisting of a mosque, library, madrasah, fountain and bazaar is an example of a work in his honor.

== Death ==
On the morning of 1 October 1730 İbrâhim Pasha was murdered. His body was handed over to the Janissaries, and it was taken through the streets of Istanbul and mutilated after various public insults in Sultanahmet Square.

Political offices
| Preceded by Nişancı Mehmed Pasha | Grand Vizier of the Ottoman Empire; 9 May 1718 – 16 October 1730 | Succeeded by Silahdar Damad Mehmed Pasha |
