= Kafes =

Form of house arrest used in the Ottoman Empire

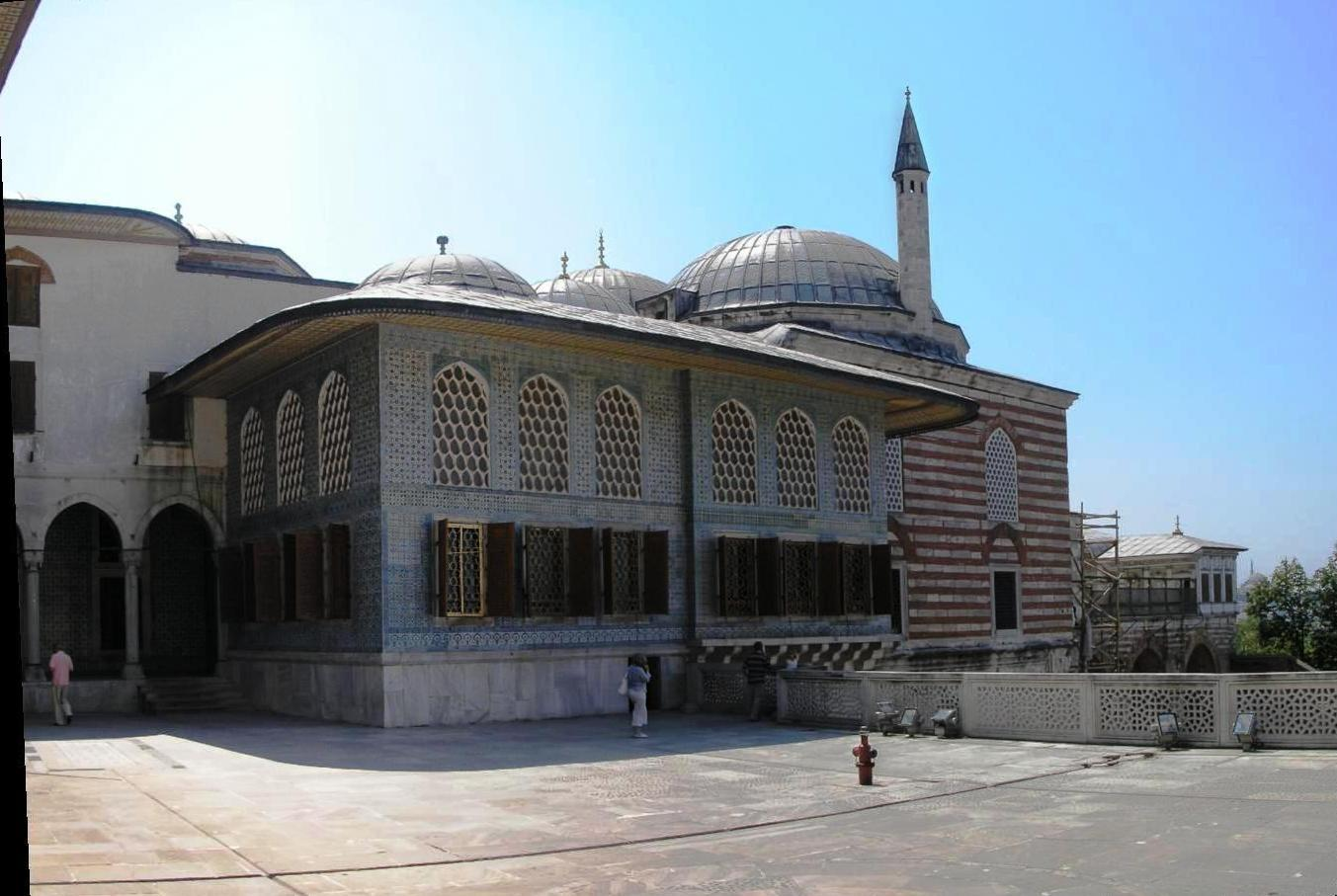
The apartments of the Crown Prince in the Topkapı Palace, which was also called kafes

The Kafes (Ottoman Turkish: قفس, romanized: kafes, from Arabic: قفص), literally "cage", was the part of the Imperial Harem of the Ottoman Palace where possible successors to the throne were kept under a form of house-arrest and constant surveillance by the palace guards.

The early history of the Ottoman Empire is littered with succession wars between rival sons of the deceased sultan. It was common for a new sultan to have his brothers killed, including infants, sometimes dozens of them at once. This practice reduced the number of claimants to the throne, leading to several occasions where the Ottoman line seemed destined to end. The confinement of heirs provided security for an incumbent sultan and continuity of the dynasty.

== First use ==
When Ahmed I died in 1617, his eldest son Osman II was only 13 years old, and for the first time in 14 generations, the Imperial Council altered succession so that the late sultan's 25-year-old brother acceded to the throne as Mustafa I. He was deposed (for the first time) the following year and became the first inmate of the Kafes although he and other princes throughout the preceding generations had been sequestered in various other places of comfortable confinement.

== Rule of seniority ==
The next time there was a succession choice between a son or younger brother was in 1687 and the brother was again preferred. Thereafter, agnatic seniority was adopted as the rule of succession in the House of Osman so that all males within an older generation were exhausted before the succession of the eldest male in the next generation. This rule has also been largely adopted by other Islamic kingdoms.

It became common to confine brothers, cousins and nephews to the Kafes, generally not later than when they left the harem (women's quarters) at puberty. This also marked the end of their education and many sultans came to the throne ill-prepared to be rulers, without any experience of government or affairs outside the Kafes. They had only the company of slaves and women of the harems, and occasionally a deposed sultan.

The degree of confinement varied from reign to reign. Abdülaziz (1861–1876) confined his nephews to the Kafes when he succeeded his half-brother Abdülmecid I, their father, on the throne, but allowed them some freedom. He took his two eldest nephews with him when he traveled to Europe in 1867. At different times, it was the policy to ensure that inmates of the Kafes were only assigned barren concubines. Consequently, some sultans did not produce sons until they acceded to the throne. These sons, by virtue of their youth at the time of their fathers' deaths, ensured that the rule of elderness became so entrenched that sometimes the son of a sultan was confined during the reigns of cousins and older brothers before acceding to his father's throne.

Some inmates of the Kafes grew old and died there before they had the opportunity to succeed to the throne. Confinement in the Kafes had a great impact on the personalities of the captives and many of them developed psychological disorders. At least one deposed sultan and one heir committed suicide in the Kafes.

== Later years ==
The last Ottoman sultan, Mehmet VI Vahidettin (1918–1922) was 56 when he came to the throne and had been either in the harem or the Kafes his whole life. He was confined to the Kafes by his uncle (Abdülaziz) and had stayed there during the reigns of his three older brothers. It was the longest and last confinement of a sultan by his predecessors.

By the later years of the Ottoman dynasty, the Kafes had become a metaphor for the confinement of princes rather than the actual place where they were confined. The heir of the last sultan had apartments in the Dolmabahçe Palace, on the Bosphorus, where the sultan also lived. The last sultan's deposed older brother Abdul Hamid II was confined in rooms of his own choosing at Beylerbeyi Palace in his final years and died there in 1918. The Topkapı Palace, the original location of the Kafes, had by then long fallen into disuse.

== See also ==
- Line of succession to the former Ottoman throne
