= Patrona Halil =

Leader of a 1730 uprising in the Ottoman Empire

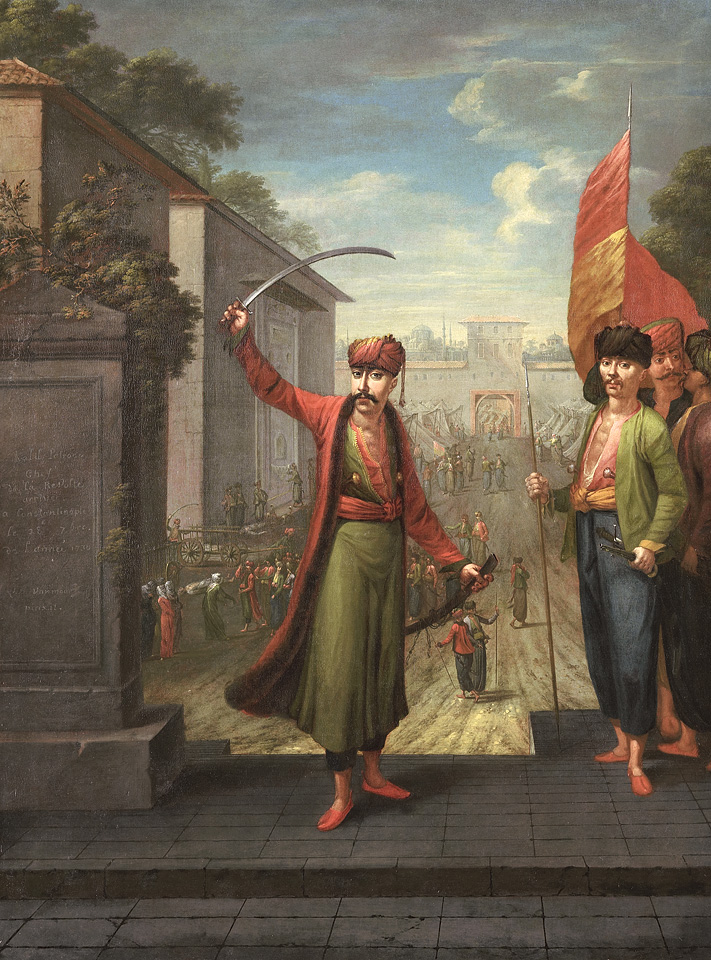
Portrait of Patrona Halil made by Jean Baptiste Vanmour (1671–1737).

Patrona Halil (Albanian: Halil Patrona; Turkish: Patrona Halil; c. 1690 in Hrupishta – November 25, 1730 in Constantinople) was the instigator of a mob uprising in 1730 which replaced Sultan Ahmed III with Mahmud I and ended the Tulip Period in Ottoman history.

== Early life ==
Halil was born to an Albanian family in Hrupishta, a village in the then Bitola vilayet. He became a Janissary and after joining a Janissary rebellion in Niš and leading one in 1720 in Vidin, he moved to the capital. He was known to have engaged in petty trade and crafts like working as a hammam attendant. Halil was also a former sailor. He spent much of his time at meyhanes of Galata. Halil was known as Horpeşteli Arnavut Halil after his place of birth and ethnicity but his Albanian compatriots called him Patrona (Vice Admiral).

== Revolt ==
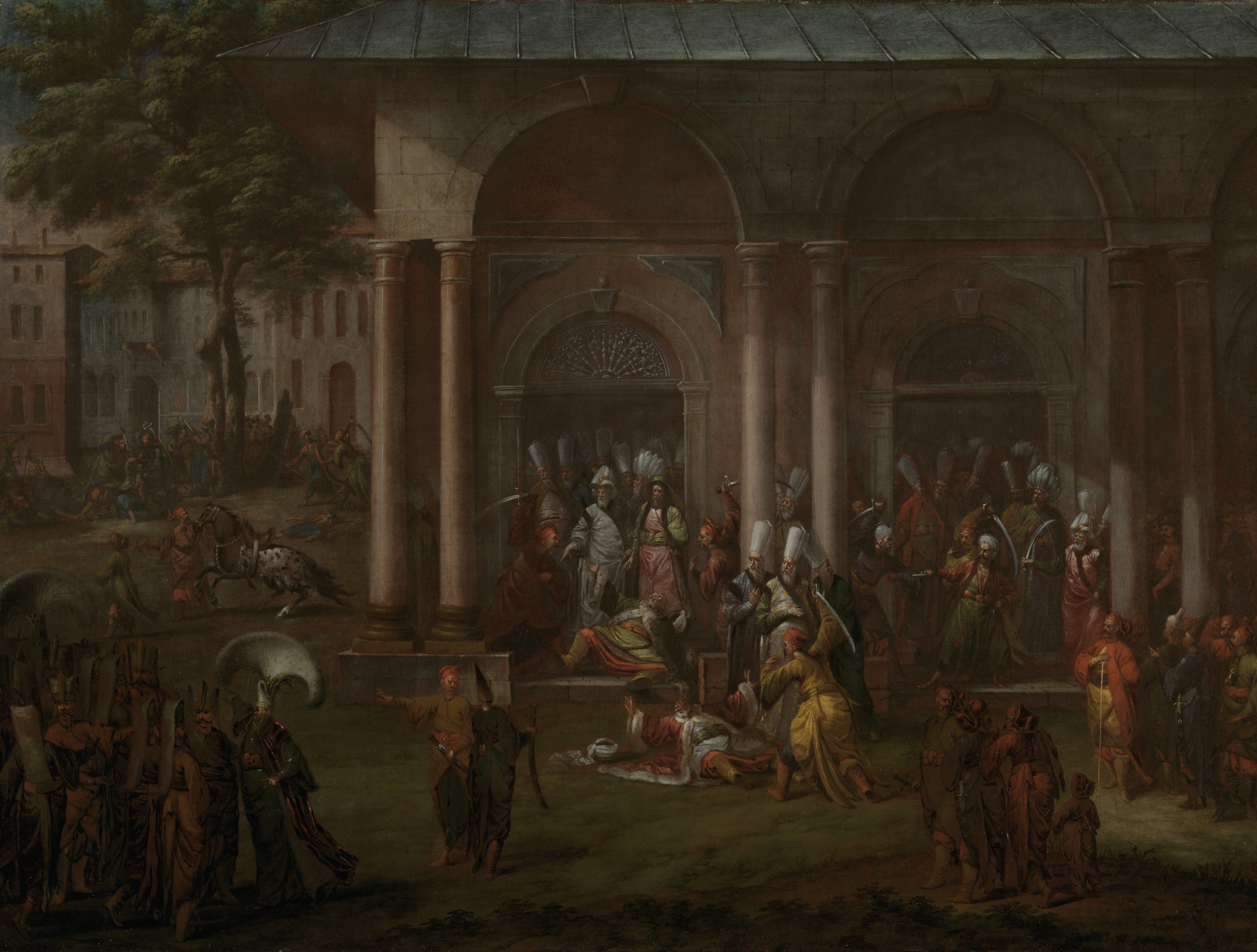
Events of the Patrona Halil rebellion; painting by Jean Baptiste Vanmour.

His followers were 12,000 Janissaries, mostly Albanians. For weeks after the revolt, the empire was in the hands of the insurgents. Patrona Halil rode with the new sultan to the Mosque of Eyub where the ceremony of girding Mahmud I with the Sword of Osman was performed; many of the chief officers were deposed and successors to them appointed at the dictation of the bold rebel who had served in the ranks of the Janissaries and who appeared before the sultan bare-legged and in his old uniform of a common soldier. A Greek butcher, named Yanaki, had formerly given credit to Patrona and had lent him money during the three days of the insurrection. Patrona showed his gratitude by compelling the Divan to make Yanaki Hospodar of Moldavia. Yanaki however never took charge of this office.

The Khan of Crimea assisted the Grand Vizier, the Mufti and the Agha of the Janissaries in putting down the rebellion. Patrona was killed in the sultan's presence after a Divan in which he had commanded that war be declared against Russia. His Greek friend, Yanaki, and 7,000 of those who had supported him were also put to death. The jealousy which the officers of the Janissaries felt towards Patrona, and their readiness to aid in his destruction, facilitated the exertions of Mahmud I's supporters in putting an end to the rebellion.

The aftermath of the rebellion led to fears of security and crime, this led to stronger state policies to regulate life in Constantinople.

== Sources ==
- Başaran, Betül (2014). Selim III, Social Control and Policing in Istanbul at the End of the Eighteenth Century: Between Crisis and Order. BRILL. ISBN 9789004274556.
- Faroqhi, Suraiya; McGowan, Bruce; Pamuk, Sevket (1997). An Economic and Social History of the Ottoman Empire, Volume 2. Cambridge University Press. ISBN 9780521574556.
- Jókai, Mór (2012). Halil the Pedlar A Tale of Old Stambul. tredition. ISBN 9783847209188.
