= Acem Bekir Efendi =

Ottoman chief of scribes and book collector (c. 1640s–1723)

- Audience of the Polish ambassador Stanisław Tarnowski at the Topkapı Palace, 1707, a painting in which Shirvani has been identified

Reis ül-Küttab
- In office 19 October 1689 (Note: Appointed on 19 October 1689 and again on 9 January 1690; the second appointment lasted until October 1694.) – October 1694
- Monarchs: Suleiman II; Ahmed II
- Preceded by: Ahmed Şemsi Efendi
- Succeeded by: Rami Mehmed Pasha

Reis ül-Küttab
- In office August 1703 – 22 July 1706
- Monarch: Ahmed III
- Preceded by: Abdülkerim Bey Efendi
- Succeeded by: Abdülkerim Bey Efendi

Reis ül-Küttab
- In office 30 January 1711 – 12 February 1712
- Monarch: Ahmed III
- Preceded by: Abdülkerim Bey Efendi
- Succeeded by: Abdülkerim Bey Efendi

Reis ül-Küttab
- In office 12 June 1713 – 6 October 1713
- Monarch: Ahmed III
- Preceded by: Abdülkerim Bey Efendi
- Succeeded by: Süleyman Efendi

Personal details
- Born: Abu Bakr al-Shirvani c. 1640 Baku, Safavid Shirvan
- Died: 12 June 1723 Constantinople, Ottoman Empire
- Resting place: Near the Kirazlı Mescid, Constantinople
- Spouse(s): Nevruz Kadın; Afife Kadin
- Parent: Rustam

Abu Bakr ibn Rustam al-Shirvani (Arabic: أبو بكر بن رستم الشرواني; c. 1640s – 12 June 1723), known in Ottoman Turkish sources as Acem Bekir Efendi ("Bekir the Persian") or Şirvanlı Kara Ebubekir Efendi, was an Ottoman bureaucrat and manuscript collector. Born a subject of Safavid Iran, probably in Baku, he left Iran on pilgrimage as a youth, studied in Cairo, and entered Ottoman service in Constantinople under the patronage of the Köprülü family. He served five times as Reis ül-Küttab (chief of scribes) and held senior posts in the financial administration. He was one of the largest private collectors of Arabic manuscripts of his time; more than a thousand manuscripts bearing his ownership notes have been identified in libraries around the world.

== Name ==
In his ownership notes he generally signed as Abū Bakr ibn Rustam ibn Aḥmad ibn Maḥmūd al-Shirwānī, occasionally inserting "Muḥammad" after Abū Bakr. The nisba al-Shirwānī appears in almost all of his notes; in isolated cases he used the forms al-Bādkūhī and al-Bākūyī, both meaning "of Baku". Ottoman authors called him Acem ("Persian"), a term that in this period designated someone from Safavid territory, and Kara ("dark"), which may refer to his complexion or beard. After 1703 the chronicle Nusretname of Silahdar Fındıklılı Mehmed Agha refers to him as "Kızılbaş Kara Bekir", possibly reflecting personal hostility.

== Life ==
He was born in 1640s, probably in Baku. His father was Rustam ibn Sultan Ahmad ibn Sultan Mahmud, and elsewhere as "al-Shahriyārī then al-Shirwānī", indicating that the family had come to Shirvan from Shahriyar, near Tehran. The Ottoman biographer Ahmed Resmi Efendi calls the father "Rustam bey", suggesting some rank.

Before 1658 he and his father made the pilgrimage to Mecca and Medina with the Iranian caravan and did not return. They settled in Cairo, where they joined the circle of the governor of Egypt, Şişman İbrahim Pasha. The historian Hezarfen Hüseyin Efendi and the travel writer Evliya Çelebi both met him there through this shared patron. In Cairo he studied with the Azhar jurist Ali Shabramallisi and with the philologist Abd al-Qadir al-Baghdadi. He was attached to the Sulaymaniyya madrasa.

In Egypt, he spent some time researching pyramids and in a margin note he later corrected a medieval author's description of the pyramids from his own visit inside one.

== Career ==
Around 1672–1673 he travelled to Constantinople by way of the Syrian coast and Damascus. There he attended the gatherings of Amcazade Köprülü Hüseyin Pasha, through whom he obtained a secretarial post in the outer treasury. He also took part in the learned gatherings of Grand Vizier Köprülü Fazıl Ahmed Pasha; a note in his hand records that in September 1676 he completed reading the first quarter of the Persian history of Wassaf in the vizier's assembly, establishing its text and explaining difficult words.

Under Grand Vizier Merzifonlu Kara Mustafa Pasha he was appointed to the mining revenues office (1679–1680) and then to the comptrollership of Anatolia, and in 1682 became comptroller of the cavalry. He accompanied the army to the siege of Vienna in 1683, during which he was promoted to secretary of the Janissaries. After the defeat and the execution of Kara Mustafa Pasha he lost his post.

From about 1684 to 1689 he lived in quasi-exile at the fortress of Seddülbahir on the Dardanelles, where he joined Köprülü Fazıl Mustafa Pasha, then its commander. In 1686–1687 he had a copy made of Ibn al-Anbārī's al-Zāhir from the pasha's own manuscript, and on 24 January 1687 he was among the listeners at a reading of al-Nawawi's commentary on Sahih Muslim held in Fazıl Mustafa's presence. His father died no later than December 1687.

When Fazıl Mustafa Pasha became grand vizier, al-Shirvani was appointed reis ül-küttab on 19 October 1689, and again on 9 January 1690. This second term lasted until October 1694. In 1691 he accompanied Fazıl Mustafa Pasha on campaign with the chancery; at Slankamen the Italian diplomat and scholar Luigi Ferdinando Marsili met him and conversed with him on scientific subjects, and found that he had many valuable books with him in the field. He remained in office after the grand vizier was killed at the Battle of Slankamen in August 1691. English diplomatic correspondence of the period described him as a friend of the French.

In 1692 he composed the Persian reply of Ahmed II to the Safavid shah Suleiman, delivered to the shah's ambassador Qalb-ʿAlī Khan Ziyadoglu at Edirne. The letter addressed the shah as "Most-Sublime Majesty" while withholding titles of imperial dignity, described the Ottoman–Safavid peace as one of "fraternization", cited the Qur'anic injunction to "fulfill the oath", and asked for the shah's moral support in the war against the Holy League. The final text was submitted for the sultan's inspection, and in recognition of its style Ahmed II confirmed Shirvani as reis ül-küttab in perpetuity on 6 April 1692, an unprecedented act that was later revoked. During the same months, on 22 March 1692, he had the vizierial patent drawn up for the governor of Diyarbekir, who had been newly appointed to the province of Basra.

According to Ahmed Resmi, the honour provoked the enmity of Grand Vizier Sürmeli Ali Pasha, who in 1694 removed him from the capital by appointing him sanjak-bey of Elbasan and sending him on the campaign in the Morea. He took part in the siege of Corinth.

After the fall of Sürmeli Ali Pasha he returned to the financial administration: in late 1695 he was appointed defterdar and then chief comptroller, later serving as head of the mint and as nişancı (seal-bearer). He was reis ül-küttab for a third time from August 1703 to 22 July 1706, a fourth time from 30 January 1711 to 12 February 1712, and a fifth time from 12 June to 6 October 1713. (Note: Aslan counts four terms, dating the third to 1122 AH (1711) and the fourth to 1125 AH (1713–1714), after which he was transferred to the post of defter emini on account of his age.) In his final years he held the office of şıkk-ı sânî defterdarı (head of finances for Anatolia), from 1718 until his death.

== Family and personal life ==
His first known wife, Nevruz Kadın, had founded a primary school near the Süleymaniye Mosque and died before 1704. In that year he endowed the revenues of three mills near the Balat gate and of an iron mine at Köstendil to her foundation, to provide clothing and shoes every year for its twenty-eight pupils and teachers. He lived near the Süleymaniye Mosque; his house burned in the great fire of 17 July 1718, but he appears to have kept his books in a separate stone building.

Lady Mary Wortley Montagu, who visited Constantinople in 1718, recorded that after the death of Mustafa II his favourite consort was ordered to remarry, and chose "Bekir Effendi", the elderly official who had presented her to the palace as a girl of ten, so that she could keep her vow never to share a bed with a second husband. Boris Liebrenz identifies this woman, rendered "Hafise" or "Hafife" in editions of Montagu's letters, with Afife Kadin, who is recorded as Shirvani's sole heir and who in 1726–1727 dedicated one of his manuscripts, describing herself as the widow of Mustafa II. (Note: Aslan treats the consort of Mustafa II (named Hafsa Sultan after Uluçay) and ʿAfīfa as separate wives. Liebrenz attributes the appearance of a "Hafsa Sultan" in modern lists of sultans' consorts to misreadings of Montagu's spelling.) He had no surviving children.

== Scholarship and writings ==
Ottoman biographers praised his prose, calling him "a second Hariri" in composition. He wrote in Arabic, Persian and Ottoman Turkish. Works attributed to him include:

- Mā lā budda minhu al-adīb min al-mashhūr wa-l-gharīb, a glossary of difficult Arabic, Persian and technical terms in the history of Wassaf. He left it unfinished, and it was completed by Mirzazade Ahmed Neyli Efendi, so that library catalogues attribute it to either author.
- A partial Turkish translation of Ibn Khallikan's Deaths of Eminent Men and the Sons of the Epoch.
- A treatise on mathematics.

A few of his Turkish verses survive in anthologies. He also wrote one of ten commendations prefixed to Ibrahim Vahdi Efendi's Muʿavvel (1696), alongside leading scholars of the capital. The future grand vizier Rami Mehmed Pasha and the poet Nabi addressed letters to him as a patron.

The philosopher Mastçızade Abdullah (d. 1737), whom he met in a literary salon, became one of his few known friends and left a posthumous sketch of his interests in lexicography, poetry and the biography of hadith transmitters.

== Library ==
Shirvani assembled one of the largest private libraries of his time, consisting mostly of Arabic manuscripts. He marked his books with ownership notes, often adding biographical notes on authors, collation remarks and tables of contents. Ali Aslan identified 1,050 manuscripts bearing his ownership notes, held in 105 collections in eleven countries, most of them in the Süleymaniye Library in Istanbul; Boris Liebrenz identified 754 bound volumes containing 1,006 works by 608 authors. At least 24 of his books passed into the library of his colleague, the şeyhülislam Feyzullah Efendi.

Unlike several of his contemporaries he did not endow his books to a library. After his death the estate was confiscated for inventory; the register lists 1,118 books, including about 25 in "the Latin tongue". The books were auctioned in 874 lots, most of them in the Fatih Mosque, and fetched 455,937 akçe, more than the rest of his movable property combined. The most expensive item, at 12,005 akçe, was a volume of the Epistles of the Brethren of Purity. Grand Vizier Damad İbrahim Pasha bought 111 books from the estate. His widow received a share of the estate together with her dowry of 300,000 akçe; the larger part went to the treasury.

== Death ==
He fell ill at the beginning of Ramadan 1135 and died on 12 June 1723 in Constantinople. Mirzazade Ahmed Neyli wrote a chronogram on his death, which describes him as nearly a hundred years old and as "a second Wassaf". He was buried near the Kirazlı Mescid, opposite the school founded by his wife Nevruz Kadın; his grave has not been located.

== Bibliography ==
- Aslan, Ali (2024). Yazma Eserlerde Mülkiyet Tezâhürleri ve Temellük Kayıtları: Reîsülküttâb Acem Bekir Efendi Örneği (PhD thesis) (in Turkish). Istanbul: İstanbul Üniversitesi, Sosyal Bilimler Enstitüsü.
- Ahıshalı, Recep (2023) [2001]. Osmanlı Devlet Teşkilâtında Reisülküttâblık (XVIII. Yüzyıl) (in Turkish). Istanbul: Timaş Yayınları. ISBN 978-605-08-4737-6.
- Güngörürler, Selim (2019). "Fraternity, Perpetual Peace, and Alliance in Ottoman-Safavid Relations, 1688–1698: A Diplomatic Revolution in the Middle East". Turcica. 50: 145–207. doi:10.2143/TURC.50.0.3286574.
- Liebrenz, Boris (2026). Empire of Books: Constantinople, the Library of Abū Bakr al-Širwānī (d. 1135/1723), and the Ottoman Archive of Arabic Literatures. Bibliotheca Arabica. Vol. 2. Leiden: Brill. doi:10.1163/9789004774803. ISBN 978-90-04-77479-7.
