= Safiya =

Safiya, Safeia
- Pronunciation: Arabic: [sˤafija]
- Gender: Female
- Language: Arabic

Origin
- Meaning: Pure; Sincere Friend
- Region of origin: Arab world

Other names
- Alternative spelling: Saffiyah, Safia, Safya, Safie, Safeia, Safieh
- Variant form: Safiye

Safiya (Arabic: صفية, romanized: Ṣafiyya) is an Arab name, meaning "pure." Alternative transliterations include Saffiyah, Safiyyah, Safie, Safia, Safija, Safya, Safiyah, Safeia, etc.

Notable bearers of the name include:

== Medieval ==
- Safiyyah bint Abd al-Muttalib (late 560s–c. 640), Sahaba and a prominent person in Islamic history
- Safiyya bint Huyayy (c. 610–c. 670), one of the wives of the Islamic prophet Muhammad
- Safiyyah bint Abi al-As, daughter of Abu al-As ibn Umayyah
- Safiye Sultan (mother of Mehmed III), Ottoman Valide sultan
- Safiye Sultan (daughter of Mustafa II) (1696–1778), the daughter of Ottoman sultan Mustafa II

== Modern ==
- Safia Abdi Haase (born 1959), Somali nurse and women's rights activist
- Safia Abukar Hussein (born 1981), Somali sprinter
- Safia Amajan (1941–2006), Afghan women's rights advocate and critic of the Taliban
- Safia Bengueddoudj (born 1986), French–Algerian footballer
- Safia Boukhima (born 1991) Algerian volleyball player
- Safia El Emari (born 1949), Egyptian actress
- Safia Farkash (born 1952), Libyan wife of Muammar Gaddafi
- Safia Middleton-Patel (born 2004), Welsh footballer
- Safia Minney (born 1964), British social entrepreneur and author
- Safia Shah (born 1966), British writer, editor and television news producer
- Safia Taleb Ali al-Suhail (born 1965) Iraqi politician
- Safia Tarzi, Afghan fashion designer.
- Safiya Abdel Rahman, Egyptian active in girl guiding and scouting
- Safiya George, U.S. Virgin Islands nurse practitioner and academic administrator
- Safiya Henderson-Holmes (1950–2001), African-American poet
- Safiya Hussaini (born 1967), Nigerian condemned to death for adultery, later acquitted
- Safiya Nygaard (born 1992), American YouTuber
- Safiya Songhai (born 1984), American film director
- Safiya Zaghloul (1876–1946), Egyptian political activist
- Sfia Bouarfa (born 1950), Moroccan-Belgian politician
- Siti Safiyah, Malaysian ten-pin bowler

== Fictional characters ==
- Safie, a character in Frankenstein
- Safiya fon Hasstrell, a character from Susan Dennard’s Witchlands series
- Safiya Llewellyn-Fayyad, a character from Life is Strange: Double Exposure
- Safiyah Sohail, a DC comics character

== See also ==
- Safiye, Turkish form
