= Muslı Kadın =

Consort of Ottoman Sultan Ahmed III

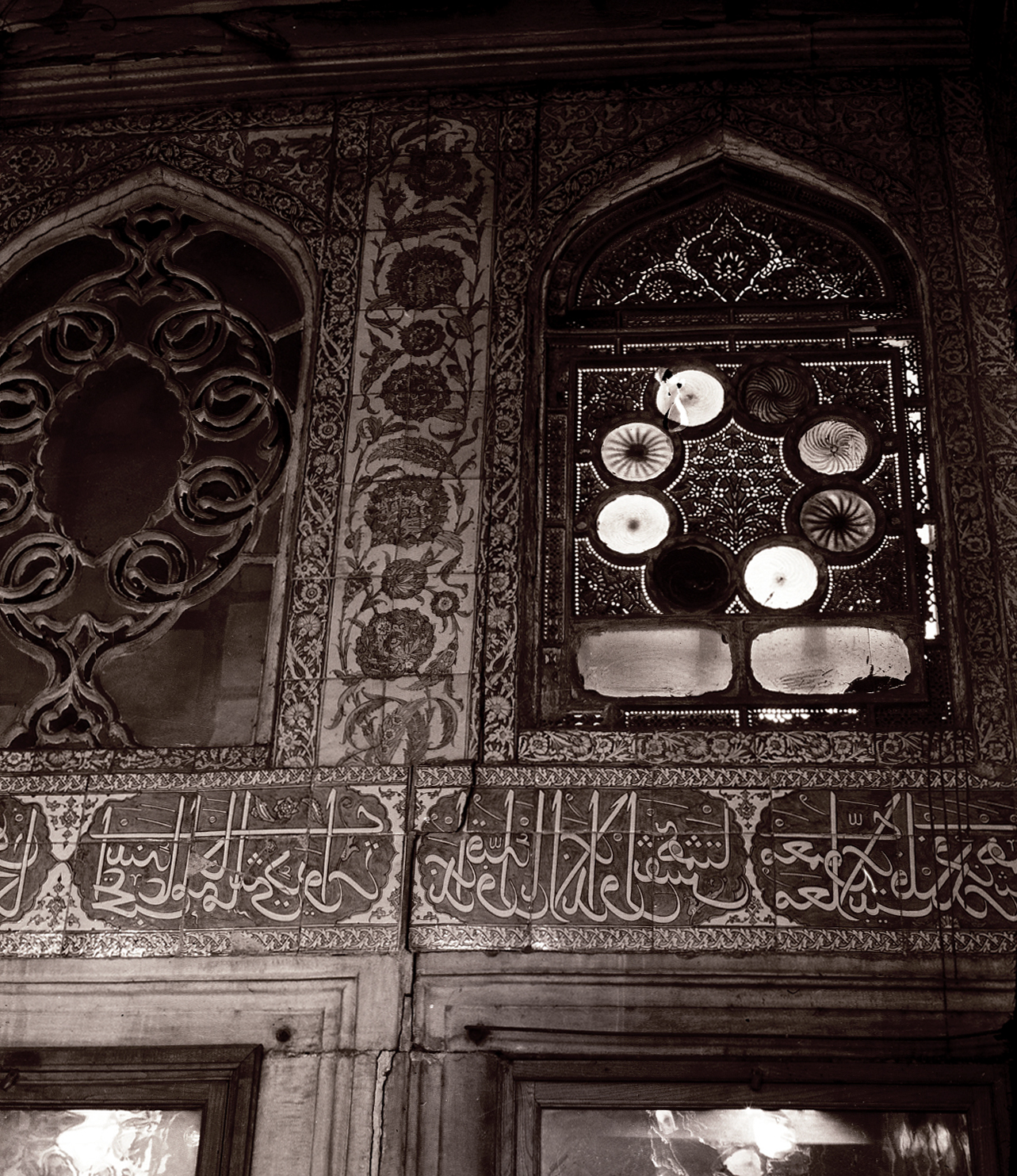
- The sarcophagus of Emine Musli Kadin is located inside the New Mosque at Eminönü in Istanbul
- Born: c. 1699; Sochi, Circassia
- Died: 2 August 1750 (aged 50–51); Eski Palace, Beyazıt Square, Istanbul, Ottoman Empire
- Burial: New Mosque, Eminönü, Istanbul
- Consort of: Ahmed III
- Issue: Ayşe Sultan; Zübeyde Sultan
- Religion: Sunni Islam

Emine Muslı Kadın (known also as Muslıhe, Muslu, or Musalli; Ottoman Turkish: امینہ مسلی قادین; "benign, trustworthy" and "consoler, comforter"; c. 1699 – 2 August 1750) was a consort of Ottoman Sultan Ahmed III (reign 1703 – 1730).

== Early life ==
Emine Muslı Kadın was born in 1699 in Sochi, Circassia. She had two elder sisters and a younger brother. In her youth, she practiced playing piano and harp.

When she was eleven she ended up in Istanbul via the Crimean slave trade and was entrusted in the care of Saliha Sultan (a consort of Mustafa II, Ahmed III's older brother) in the Old Palace. Ahmed visited old palace in 1713 on the Eid-ul-Fitr when he came to meet his nieces. She became the consort of Ahmed in 1714.

== Palace life and charities ==
Muslı Kadın enjoyed a comfortable status during the reign of Ahmed III. She had beautiful eyes with darting eyelashes. In 1715, she constructed a bakery in the bazaar of Istanbul.

On 10 October 1715, she gave birth to her first child, a daughter named Ayşe Sultan, in the Topkapi Palace. She was married thrice to grand vizier. During Ayşe second marriage, Muslı Kadın played a vital part in the politics. On 28 March 1728, Muslı Kadın gave birth to her second and last child, a daughter named Zübeyde Sultan.

Muslı Kadın commissioned bakeries, libraries and fountains in different places of Ottoman Empire. In 1742, she opened a rest house for travellers. She had number of wealth and she donated her wealth to needy people. She was a soft-hearted lady with forgiving nature.

== Death ==
Emine Muslı Kadın was sent to the Old Palace in 1730 after the deposition of Ahmed. She was struck by plague in 1750. She died on 2 August 1750 and was buried in New Mosque at Eminönü in Istanbul.

== Issue ==
By Ahmed III, she had two daughters:

- Ayşe Sultan (10 October 1715 - 9 July 1775). Nicknamed Küçük Ayşe (meaning Ayşe the younger) to distinguish her from her cousin Ayşe the elder, daughter of Mustafa II. She married three times and had a daughter.
- Zübeyde Sultan (28 March 1728 - 4 June 1756). She married twice but had no child.

== Sources ==
- Aktaş, Ali (2008). ÇELEBİZÂDE ÂSIM TARİHİ: Transkripsiyonlu metin.
- Sakaoğlu, Necdet (2008). Bü mülkün kadın sultanları: Vâlide sultanlar, hâtunlar, hasekiler, kadınefendiler, sultanefendiler. Oğlak Yayıncılık. ISBN 978-9-753-29623-6.
- Uluçay, Mustafa Çağatay (2007). Padişahların kadınları ve kızları. Ankara, Ötüken.
