= Afife Kadin =

Consort of Ottoman Sultan Mustafa II

Afife Kadın
- Born: c. 1682
- Died: 12 June 1723 (aged 40–41); Istanbul, Ottoman Empire
- Consort: Mustafa II; Acem Bekir Efendi
- Issue: A daughter Şehzade Mehmed; Şehzade Hüseyn; Şehzade Selim; Şehzade Ahmed; Şehzade Suleyman
Names
- Turkish: Afife Kadın; Ottoman Turkish: عفیفہ قادین
- Religion: Sunni Islam

Afife Kadın (Ottoman Turkish: عفیفہ قادین; "chaste, virtuous"; c. 1682 - 12 June 1723) was a consort of the Ottoman Sultan Mustafa II.

== Biography ==
Her origin is not confirmed, but she is believed to have fallen victim to the Crimean-Nogai raids and came to Constantinople via the Crimean slave trade, where she was purchased by minister Ebu Bekir Efendi for the Ottoman Imperial Harem, and given as a gift to the sultan around 1692, when she was ten years old.

In 1695, she became a consort (Kadin) of new Sultan Mustafa II. She was Mustafa's most loved consort, and the sentiment was reciprocated, even if they were never legally married, and the only concubine the sultan brought along with him on all three of his campaigns. She is documented several times when she received gifts from the sultan. She was the mother of five sons and one daughter with the sultan. All her five sons died in infancy. In 1699, after the death of the first consort Alicenab Kadin, Afife became the new First consort, or Başkadin.

When Mustafa II died in 1703, she was legally manumitted as an umm walad, since she had children with her master, and Mustafa II's successor Ahmed III ordered her to leave the Imperial harem by marriage, and choose her husband among the officials of the Porte. She reportedly asked Ahmed III not to force her to marry, but to kill her instead, with the argument that she had given birth to five sons with the former sultan and a living daughter. Ahmed III replied that while she had indeed given birth to six children with Mustafa II, all her sons were dead and only a daughter were alive, and repeated his demand for her to choose a husband. She finally chose the 80 years old minister Ebu Bekir Efendi. Her choice was said to be gratitude to Ebu Bekir because he had once brought her to the Imperial harem, but also because that marriage was not to be consummated as she wished to be faithful to Mustafa II. She lived in regret and mourning for the loss of Mustafa until her death, on 12 June 1723.

In March 1718, Lady Mary Wortley Montagu visited Afife Kadın in Edirne. She described her in her letters as the favorite of the former sultan.

== Issue ==
By Mustafa II, she had a daughter and five sons:

- A daughter (1696 - after 1718). It is not known which of Mustafa's three daughters born that year (Ayşe Sultan, Emine Sultan and Safiye Sultan) was the Afife's daughter, but is probraly she was Safiye, because Safiye's daughter married the son of Ebu Bekr, the Afife's second husband. Also, Safiye named her first son Ebubekr.
- Şehzade Mehmed (27 November 1698 – 3 June 1703, Edirne Palace, Edirne, buried in Turhan Sultan's türbe, New Mosque). He was the favorite son of Mustafa II, who suffered his death immensely.
- Şehzade Hüseyn (16 May 1699 – 19 September 1700, Edirne Palace, Edirne, buried in New Mosque).
- Şehzade Selim (16 May 1700 – 8 June 1702, Edirne Palace, Edirne, buried in Turhan Sultan's türbe, New Mosque).
- Şehzade Ahmed (3 March 1702 – 7 September 1703, Edirne Palace, Edirne, buried in Darülhadis Mosque).
- Şehzade Suleyman (25 December 1703 – 25 December 1703, Edirne Palace, Edirne, buried in Turhan Sultan's turbe, New Mosque). Stillbirth. His father died four days after.

== Sources ==
- Alderson, Anthony Dolphin. The Structure of the Ottoman Dynasty. — Oxf.: Clarendon Press, 1956.
- Mandel, Gabriele. Storia dell'harem. — Rusconi, 1992. — 246 p. — ISBN 978-88-18-88032-8.
- Leslie Peirce. The Imperial Harem: Women and Sovereignty in the Ottoman Empire. — Oxford University Press, 1993. — ISBN 0-19-508677-5.
- Yavuz Bahadıroğlu. Resimli Osmanlı Tarihi. — Nesil Yayınları, 2009. — ISBN 978-975-269-299-2.
