= Safiye Sultan =

Safiye Sultan may refer to:

- Safiye Sultan (mother of Mehmed III) (1550–1619), Ottoman imperial consort of Sultan Murad III, and mother and Valide Sultan of Sultan Mehmed III
- Safiye Hanımsultan (daughter of Ismihan Sultan) (1563–?), daughter of Ismihan Sultan
- Safiye Hanımsultan (1581–?), Ottoman princess, daughter of Ayşe Hümaşah Sultan
- Safiye Hanımsultan (1630–1682), Ottoman princess, daughter of Gevherhan Sultan
- Safiye Sultan (daughter of Murad IV) (after 1634–1680 or after), Ottoman princess, daughter of Sultan Murad IV
- Safiye Sultan (1640–?), Ottoman princess, daughter of Sultan Ibrahim
- Safiye Sultan (daughter of Mustafa II) (1696–1778), Ottoman princess, daughter of Sultan Mustafa II
- Safiye Sultan (1887–?), Ottoman princess, daughter of Şehzade Mehmed Selaheddin
