= Safiye =

Safiye is a Turkish feminine given name, a variant of the Arabic name Safiya. People named Safiye include:

- Safiye Ali (1891–1952), Turkish physician
- Safiye Ayla (1907–1998), Turkish singer
- Safiye Erol (1902–1964), Turkish novelist
- Safiye Sarıtürk Temizdemir (born 1995), Turkish sport shooter
- Safiye Sultan (mother of Mehmed III) (1550– after 1619), the consort of Ottoman sultan Murad III and the mother of Sultan Mehmed III
- Safiye Sultan (daughter of Mustafa II) (1696–1778), the daughter of Ottoman sultan Mustafa II
