= Zübeyde Sultan =

Daughter of Ahmed III

- Born: 28 March 1728; Topkapı Palace, Constantinople, Ottoman Empire
- Died: 4 June 1756 (aged 28); Constantinople, Ottoman Empire
- Burial: Imperial Ladies Mausoleum, Yeni Mosque, Eminönü, Istanbul
- Spouse: Süleyman Pasha (m. 1748; died 1748) Numan Pasha (m. 1749)
Names
- Turkish: Zübeyde Sultan; Ottoman Turkish: زبیدہ سلطان
- Dynasty: Ottoman
- Father: Ahmed III
- Mother: Emine Musli Kadın
- Religion: Sunni Islam

Zübeyde Sultan (Ottoman Turkish: زبیدہ سلطان; 28 March 1728 – 4 June 1756) was an Ottoman princess, daughter of Sultan Ahmed III (reign 1703 – 1730) and his consort Muslı Kadın. She was the half-sister of Sultans Mustafa III (reign 1757 – 1774) and Abdul Hamid I (reign 1774 – 1789) of the Ottoman Empire.

== Life ==
Zübeyde Sultan was born on 28 or 29 March 1728. Her father was Sultan Ahmed III, and her mother was Emine Musli Kadın. She had a full elder sister named Ayşe Sultan.

After her father was dethroned in 1730, she grew up at the Old Palace but was able to live in comfort, as he had allocated to her the income from the farmstead of the farmstead of Dilsiz Mehmed Ağa, situated near Edirne.

Her cousin Mahmud I had a yalı, or waterfront manse, built for her at the precincts of Eyüp in around August 1747.

On 6 January 1748, during Mahmud's reign, Zübeyde was married firstly to Süleyman Pasha, Beylerbey (governor – general) of Anatolia and Vizier. HOwever, he died some six months into the marriage. She married second, within the year, on 6 January 1749, Numan Pasha, kapıcılar kethüdası, or head of the Imperial Palace Guards, Sanjak-Bey (provincial governor) of Thessaloniki and Kavala, and Vizier. Her husband would go on to serve in various other provincial posts, while Zübeyde continued to live at her house in Edirne.

She had no known children.

Turkish historian Mustafa Çağatay Uluçay describes the princess as a "philanthropist, protector of the poor, who read day and night".

== Death ==
Zübeyde Sultan died of natural causes at the age of twenty-eight, on 4 June 1756. She was entombed in the Imperial Ladies Mausoleum, located at Yeni Mosque, Istanbul.

== Sources ==
- Sakaoğlu, Necdet (2008). Bu mülkün kadın sultanları: Vâlide sultanlar, hâtunlar, hasekiler, kadınefendiler, sultanefendiler. Oğlak Yayıncılık. p. 303. ISBN 978-9-753-29623-6.
- Târîh-i Râşid ve Zeyli (Râşid Mehmed Efendi ve Çelebizâde İsmaîl Âsım Efendi) (1071-1141/1660-1729) Cilt I-III. 2013. ISBN 978-6-055-24512-2.
- Haskan, Mehmed Nermi (2008). Eyüp Sultan tarihi – Volume 1. Eyüp Belediyesi Kültür Yayınları. ISBN 978-9-756-08704-6.
- Uluçay, Mustafa Çağatay (1985). Padışahların kadınları ve kızları. Türk Tarihi Kurumu Yayınları. p. 220.
- Şemʼdânî-zâde Fındıklılı, Süleyman Efendi (1976). Aktepe, M. Münir (ed.). Şemʼdânî-zâde Fındıklılı Süleyman Efendi târihi Mürʼiʼt-tevârih-Volume 1. Edebiyat Fakültesi Matbaası.
