= Ayşe Sultan (daughter of Ahmed III) =

Daughter of Ahmed III

- Born: 10 October 1715; Topkapı Palace, Constantinople, Ottoman Empire (present day Istanbul, Turkey)
- Died: 9 July 1775 (aged 59); Ortaköy Palace, Istanbul, Ottoman Empire
- Burial: Turhan Sultan Mausoleum, New Mosque, Istanbul
- Spouse: Kunduracızade Mehmed Pasha (m. 1728; died 1738); Hatip Ahmed Pasha (m. 1740; died 1748); Silahdar Mehmed Pasha (m. 1758)
- Issue: Second marriage Rukiye Hanımsultan
- Dynasty: Ottoman
- Father: Ahmed III
- Mother: Emine Muslı Kadın
- Religion: Sunni Islam

Ayşe Sultan (Ottoman Turkish: عائشه سلطان; 10 October 1715 – 9 July 1775), also called Küçuk Ayşe, was an Ottoman princess, the daughter of Sultan Ahmed III and his consort Muslı Kadın.

== Life ==
=== Birth ===
Ayşe Sultan was born on 10 October 1715 in the Topkapı Palace. Her father was Sultan Ahmed III and her mother was Emine Muslı Kadın (called also Muslıhe, Muslu or Musalli). She had a younger full sister named Zübeyde Sultan. At her birth, she was nicknamed Küçük Ayşe, meaning Ayşe "the younger", to distinguish her from her cousin Ayşe "the eldest" (Büyük Ayşe), daughter of Mustafa II.

=== Marriages ===
In 1728, when Ayşe Sultan was thirteen years old, Ahmed betrothed her to his swordbearer Kunduracızade Istanbullu Mehmed Pasha, and appointed him the governor of Rumelia. The marriage contract was concluded on 28 September 1728, and the wedding took place on 4 October 1728 at the Topkapı Palace. The couple were given the Valide Kethüdası Mehmed Pasha Palace, located at Süleymaniye as their residence, but the marriage was consummated only in 1733. In 1730, the grand vizier Nevşehirli Damat Ibrahim Pasha was killed in the uprising of Patrona Halil and Ahmed III was deposed. Ayşe Sultan's husband, Mehmed Pasha, became the grand vizier in October 1730. He remained grand vizier until January 1731, after which he was appointed, the governor of Aleppo. He died in 1738.

Following Mehmed Pasha's death, she married Hatip Ahmed Pasha, the son of grand vizier Topal Osman Pasha. The wedding took place in 1740 at the Ortaköy Palace, while the marriage was consummated in December 1742 at the Demirkapı Palace. Ahmed Pasha was appointed the governor of Mora in 1744 and died in 1748. Ayşe had a daughter with him .

Ten years after Ahmed Pasha's death, she married Silahdar Mehmed Pasha, the Sanjak Bey (provincial governor) of Tirhala. This wedding took place on 16 January 1758 at the Hekimbaşı Palace. Her dowry was 5000 ducats. Ayşe hated her third husband and refused to live with him in the same palace.

Following the death of Ayşe "the eldest" in 1752, her palace in Zeyrek was allocated to her.

=== Death ===
Ayşe Sultan died on 9 July 1775 at the age of 59, at the Ortaköy Palace and was buried in Turhan Sultan's mausoleum, located at New Mosque at Istanbul.

== Issue ==
By her second marriage Ayşe Sultan had a daughter:

- Rukiye Hanımsultan (1744 - 1780). She married Lalazade Nuri Bey.

== Charities and properties ==
There are two foundations in her name. The first of these dates to 1743. The second foundation dating back to 1776, was made after her death.

Her father had assigned her the palaces of Rami Pasha and Bahariye Palace (Mansion). She also owned lands and endowments in Izmit and Ankara.

== Sources ==
- Kala, Eyüp (2019). Osmanlı Dönemi Hanım Sultan Vakıfları ve Sosyal Politika Uygulamaları.
- Sakaoğlu, Necdet (2008). Bu mülkün kadın sultanları: Vâlide sultanlar, hâtunlar, hasekiler, kadınefendiler, sultanefendiler. Oğlak Yayıncılık. ISBN 978-9-753-29623-6.
- Uluçay, Mustafa Çağatay (2011). Padişahların kadınları ve kızları. Ankara: Ötüken. ISBN 978-9-754-37840-5.
