= Fatih Bridge =

Fatih Bridge Fatih Köprüsü
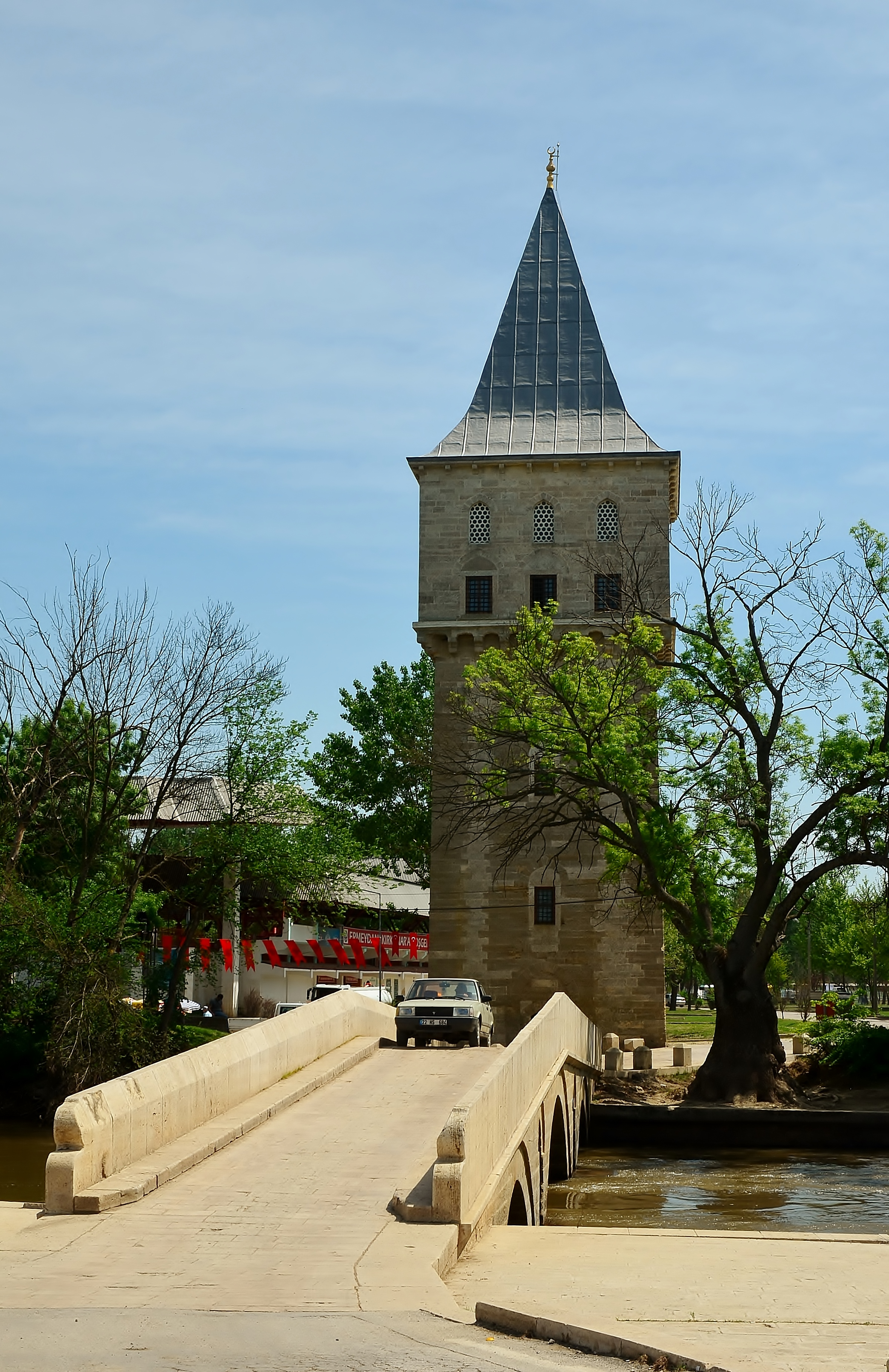
- Fatih Bridge over the Tunca and Kasr-ı Adalet (Justice Pavilion) in the background.
- Coordinates: 41.69023°N 26.55638°E
- Crosses: Tunca
- Locale: Edirne, Turkey
- Other name: Bönce Bridge
- Named for: Mehmed the Conqueror

Characteristics
- Material: Stone
- No. of spans: 3

History
- Construction end: 1452

Location
- Interactive map of Fatih Bridge

Fatih Bridge (Turkish: Fatih Köprüsü), a.k.a. Bönce Bridge, is a historic Ottoman bridge in Edirne, Turkey. It crosses the Tunca, connecting Edirne Palace to the city.

Constructed by the Ottoman sultan Mehmed the Conqueror in 1452, the bridge has three arches.
