= Kanuni Bridge =

Kanuni Bridge Kanuni Köprüsü
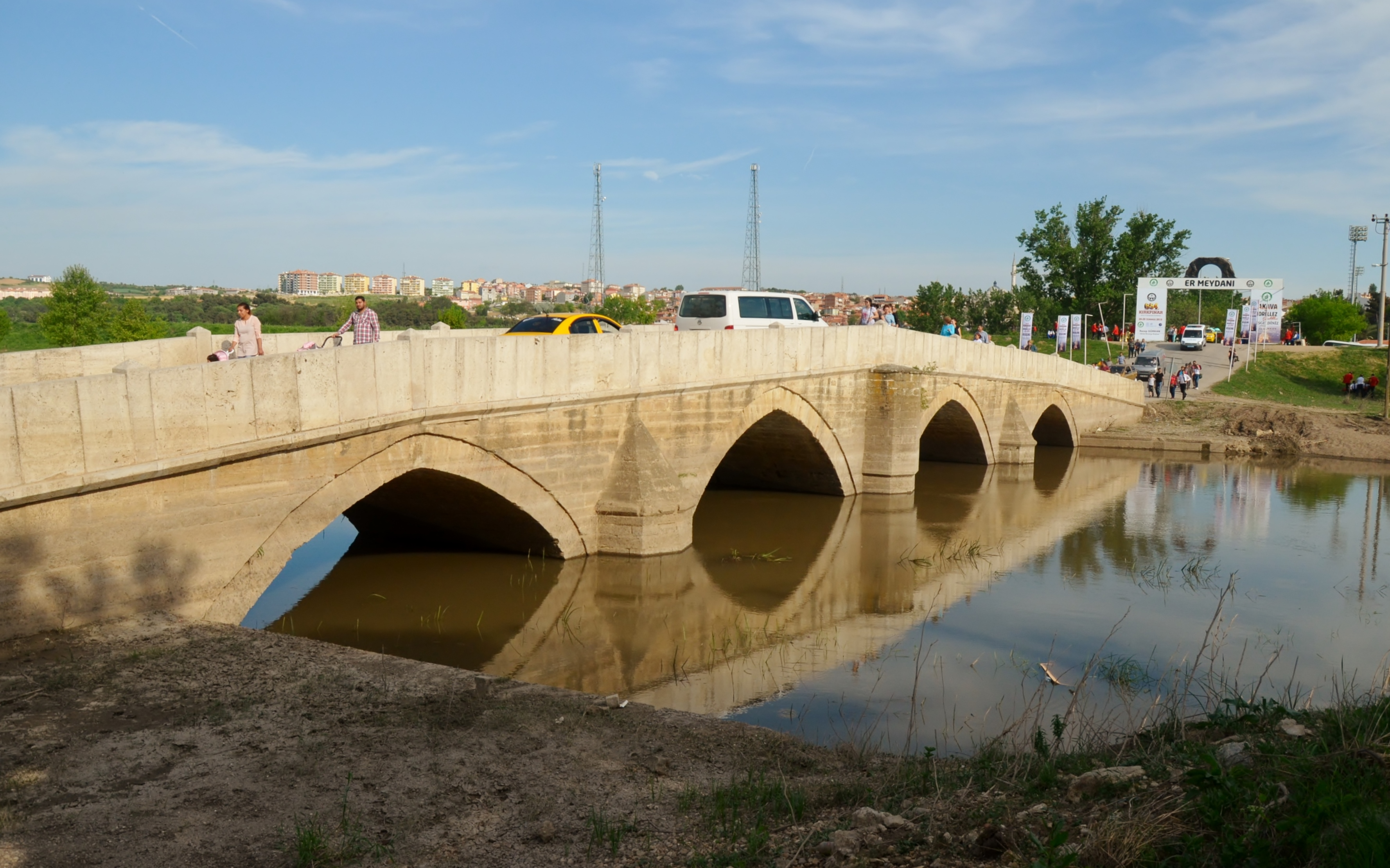
- Kanuni Bridge over the Tunca in Edirne.
- Coordinates: 41.68672°N 26.55899°E
- Crosses: Tunca
- Locale: Edirne, Turkey
- Other name: Saray Köprüsü (Palace Bridge)
- Named for: Suleiman the Magnificent

Characteristics
- Material: Stone
- Total length: 60 m (200 ft)
- Width: 4.50 m (14.8 ft)
- No. of spans: 4

History
- Architect: Mimar Sinan
- Construction end: 1554

Location
- Interactive map of Kanuni Bridge

Kanuni Bridge (Turkish: Kanuni Köprüsü) or Palace Bridge (Saray Köprüsü), is a historic Ottoman bridge in Edirne, Turkey. It crosses the Tunca river, connecting Edirne Palace with the city. It is named after Suleiman the Magnificent (r. 1520–1566), known in Turkish by the epithet "the Lawmaker" (Kanuni), who commissioned the construction.

Built in 1554 by the Ottoman master architect Mimar Sinan, the 60-metre-long (200 ft) and 4.50-metre-wide (14.8 ft) bridge has four arches.
