= Battle of Cenei =

Battle during the Great Turkish War

- Part of Great Turkish War
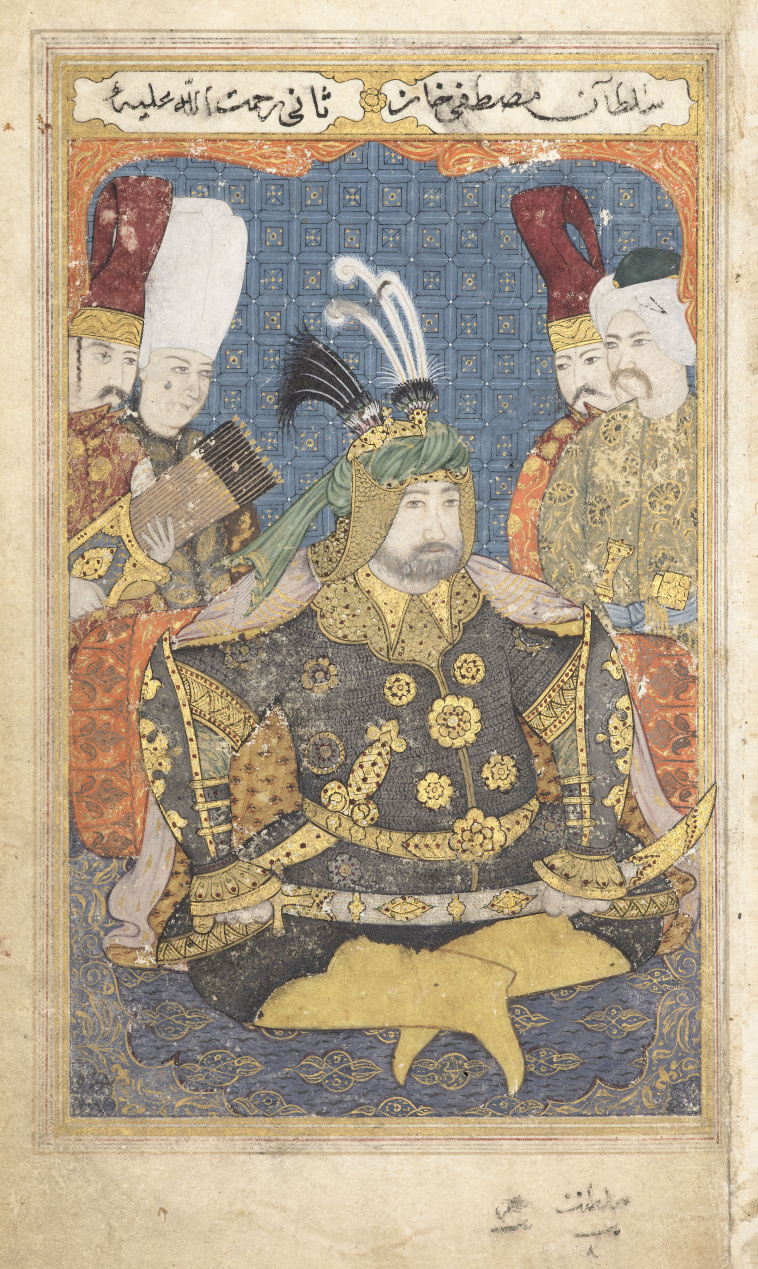
- Sultan Mustafa II dressed in full armour
Date	1696
Location	near Timișoara, Ottoman Empire
Result	Ottoman victory

Belligerents
Holy Roman Empire	Ottoman Empire

Commanders and leaders
(Holy Roman Empire) Frederick August I, Elector of Saxony	Mustafa II

Strength
Total 60,000; 40,000 infantry 20,000 cavalry	35,000

Casualties and losses
Unknown	Unknown

The Battle of Cenei (1696) took place in the Banat of Temeswar (Timișoara/Temeshvar) between the Ottoman Empire and the Habsburg Empire. The Ottomans were victorious. The Habsburg army numbered at most 40,000 infantry and 20,000 cavalry. The Ottoman army was led by Sultan Mustafa II. The Habsburg troops were led by Frederick August I of Saxony.
