= Safiye Sultan (daughter of Mustafa II) =

Daughter of Ottoman Sultan Mustafa II

- Born: 13 October 1696; Edirne Palace, Edirne, Ottoman Empire or Belgrade, Ottoman Serbia
- Died: 15 May 1778 (aged 81); Constantinople, Ottoman Empire (now Istanbul, Turkey)
- Burial: Mausoleum of Hafsa Sultan, Yavuz Selim Mosque, Istanbul, Turkey
- Spouse: Maktulzade Ali Pasha (m. 1710; died 1723) Mirzazade Mehmed Pasha (m. 1726; died 1728) Kara Mustafa Pasha (m. 1730; died 1736) Ebubekir Pasha (m. 1740; died 1759)
- Issue: First marriage Sultanzade Ebubekr Bey; Sultanzade Bayezid Bey; Zahide Hanımsultan; Second marriage Sultanzade Sadık Mehmed Bey
- Dynasty: Ottoman
- Father: Mustafa II
- Mother: Afife Kadın?
- Religion: Sunni Islam

Safiye Sultan (Ottoman Turkish: صفیه سلطان; 13 October 1696 – 15 May 1778) was an Ottoman princess, daughter of Sultan Mustafa II, and half-sister of Sultans Mahmud I and Osman III of the Ottoman Empire.

== Life ==
=== Birth ===
Safiye Sultan was born on 13 October 1696. At the time of her birth her father was traveling to Austria and part of his harem awaited him in Belgrade, while the rest remained in Edirne. Therefore Safiye could have been born in Belgrade or Edirne. Her father was the Ottoman Sultan Mustafa II, while her mother was possibly Afife Kadın.

In 1703 her father was deposed in favor of his younger brother Ahmed III and she, with her half-sisters, locked up in the Old Palace until her marriage.

=== Marriages ===
Safiye was betrothed at the same time as her sisters Emine Sultan and Ayşe Sultan, to the son of Merzifonlu Kara Mustafa Pasha, known as Maktulzade Ali Pasha, and Beylerbey (governor - general) of Adana at the time. The marriage took place on 6 May 1710, during the reign of her uncle Sultan Ahmed III. The wedding procession travelled only a short distance from the Imperial Gate, through Cebehane and Soğukçeşme road to the princess's palace at Demirkapı, known as "Rami Pasha's palace", where the marriage was consummated. Soon afterwards, in June 1710, the bridegroom was sent away to Diyarbekir to serve as provincial governor. Safiye had two sons and a daughter with him.

After Ali Pasha's death in 1723, Safiye married Mirzazade Mehmed Pasha on 1 July 1726. She had a son from this marriage. After Mehmed Pasha's death in 1728, she married Kara Mustafa Pasha in 1730. After Mustafa's death in 1736, she married Ebubekir Pasha in 1740, during the reign of her half-brother Sultan Mahmud I. She was widowed at his death in 1759.

== Issue ==
By her first marriage Safiye had two sons and a daughter:

- Sultanzade Ebubekr Bey
- Sultanzade Bayezid Bey
- Zahide Hanımsultan (1722 - 6 February 1790). She married Elhac Süleyman Bey, son of Ebu Bekr Efendi, who was the second husband of Afife Kadin, one of former Mustafa II's consort.

By her second marriage Safiye had a son:

- Sultanzade Sadik Mehmed Bey (1727 - 1780).

== Charities ==
Safiye Sultan is known to have made vakfs for Hagia Sophia, Sultan Mehmed, Sultan Bayezid and Valide Sultan mosques. In 1729, she commissioned a fountain near the Bulgurlu Mosque in Üsküdar. In 1780, two years after her death, a fountain was commissioned between Paşabahçe and Tepeköy in Bosphorus.

== Death ==
Safiye Sultan died on 15 May 1778 at the age of eighty-one, and was buried outside the mausoleum of Hafsa Sultan, Yavuz Mosque, Istanbul. Her daughter, Zahide was buried beside her.

She was one of the longest-living Ottoman princesses.

== See also ==
- List of Ottoman princesses

== Sources ==
- Uluçay, Mustafa Çağatay (2011). Padişahların kadınları ve kızları (in Turkish). Ankara: Ötüken.
- Duindam, Jeroen; Artan, Tülay; Kunt, Metin (August 11, 2011). Royal Courts in Dynastic States and Empires: A Global Perspective. BRILL. ISBN 978-9-004-20622-9.
- Sakaoğlu, Necdet (2008). Bu mülkün kadın sultanları: Vâlide sultanlar, hâtunlar, hasekiler, kadınefendiler, sultanefendiler (in Turkish). Oğlak Yayıncılık. ISBN 978-9-753-29623-6.
