= Yusuf Nabi =

Tomb of Yusuf Nâbî

Yusuf Nabi (1642 – 10 April 1712) was a Turkish Divan poet in the court of Mehmet IV. He was famous for "his brilliant lyrics filled with popular sayings and critiques of the age and verses commemorating innumerable important occasions."

He was born to a Kurdish family in Urfa (Riha). At the age of 24 Nabi left Şanlıurfa Province and came to Istanbul to study. Subsequently, around 1680, he settled in Aleppo (in modern Syria). But in 1704 when Baltacı Mehmet Pasha became the grand vizier, Nabi followed him to İstanbul and was appointed as the superintendent of the mint (darphane eminliği). He subsequently held the position of chief auditor (başmukabelecilik). He passed away two years after his return from Aleppo, in April 1712. Nâbî’s grave is located in the Karaca-Ahmet Cemetery in Üsküdar.
