= Safia Abdi Haase =

Somali graduate nurse (born 1959)

Safia Abdi Haase صفية عبدي هاس
- Born: 5 May 1959 (age 67); Somalia
- Education: Harstad University College, University of Oslo
- Occupation: graduate nurse
- Title: Ambassador with the Amathea Foundation

Safia Yusuf Abdi Haase (Somali: Safiiya Yuusf Cabdi Xaase, Arabic: صفية عبدي هاس; born 1959) is a Somali graduate nurse. She was trained at the Harstad University College in Harstad, Norway, and also has a Master's in International Welfare and Health Policy from the University of Oslo. Haase is an official with the Amathea Foundation, having joined the non-profit organization in 2005. In this capacity, she helped formulate the Norwegian government's national action plan against female genital mutilation (FGM) and serves as an ambassador against gender-based violence. Haase is also part of the KIM national board, which works toward inter-cultural understanding, acceptance and protection. Additionally, she is a member of the Global Core Team of the Human Dignity and Humiliation Studies interdisciplinary network of academics and practitioners. Haase has received various awards and recognition for her work, including the 1999 Harstad Honorary Ambassador, Harstad Savings Banks Culture Prize 2000, Troms County Council Equality Award 2001, Unni and Jon Dørsjøs Memorial Fund at the Norwegian Women's Public Health Association in 2005, Honorary Member of the Norwegian Women's Public Health Association in 2005, 2005 Africa Forum – Nordic, Top 10 Annual Award in 2007, and the 2007 Reconciliation Prize/Blanche Major. In 2014, she was also presented Norway's Order of St. Olav, the first immigrant woman to receive the honour.
