= Abd al-Qadir al-Baghdadi =

Ottoman era author, philologist and grammarian

'Abd al-Qadir ibn 'Umar al-Baghdadi
- Born: 1030 AH / 1620 AD; Baghdād, Iraq
- Died: 1093 AH / 1682 AD; Cairo, Egypt

Academic work
- Notable works: Khizānat al-adab wa-lubb lubab lisān al-ʻArab

'Abd al-Qadir ibn 'Umar al-Baghdadi (Arabic: عبد القادر بن عمر البغدادي; 1030–1093 AH / 1620–1682 AD) was a writer, philologist, grammarian, magistrate, bibliophile and a leading literary encyclopedist of the Ottoman era.

== Life ==
He was born in Baghdad in 1030 AH (1630 AD), where he received his early education, excelling in science and literature, and mastering Arabic, Persian and Turkish. He travelled from Baghdad to Damascus in 1048 AH/1638 AD and contacted the head of the student supervisors, who became his first professor in Damascus. He then joined the circle of Muḥammad bin Yaḥyā al-Furthi to study Arabic science.

In 1050 AH/1640 AD, he went to Egypt to join a group of scholars of the Al-Azhar Mosque. His most prominent professors were Yassin Al-Homsi and Shahab ad-dīn Al-Khafaji, author of Rīhāna Al-Albā (ريحانة الألبا وزهرة الحياة الدنيا) and Shefa Al-Ghalīl (شفاء الغليل). Al-Khafaji recognised the cultural significance of al-Baghdadi's literary work and bequeathed him his library after his death.

In 1077 AH/1667 AD, Abd al-Qadir left Egypt to visit the Ottoman capital in Istanbul, but soon returned. He was a close companion of the governor Ibrāhīm Kutkhda. When the governor removed to the Levant in 1085 AH/1674 AD, and then to Edirne, he took Abd al-Qadir with him. In Edirne, Abd al-Qadir met Ibn Fadlallāh al-Mahabī, author of the Khlāsat al-'Athr (خلاصة الأثر في أعيان القرن الحادي عشر) – 'Concise Traditions of the Eminent of the 11th-century' – who was a friend of his father's.

In Edirne (Turkey), Abd al-Qadir contracted an untreatable illness. He travelled in some Turkish countries before returning to Cairo where he died in 1093 AH/ 1682 AD

The great reformist sultan Ahmed Pasha Köprülü brought Abd al-Qadir into his employ with a commission to surpass ibn Hishām al-Anṣarī’s «Commentary», by writing the definitive commentary on the ancient poem Bānat Su'ad by Kaʿb ibn Zuhayr. Meanwhile, Abd al-Qadir al-Baghdādī came to the notice of the Ottoman Sultan Mehmed IV, the reputated "Sultan of Literature". Al-Baghdadi left many works of translation, mostly of the pre-Islamic writers and poets.

== Legacy ==
Abd al-Qadir al-Baghdadi's library with its philological and literary collections, is one of the most important libraries of the Ottoman era. His methodology of transmission takes the classical form, known as isnād, as a way of explaining and controlling his narration by citing an unbroken chain of witness testimony. In the accounts of some of the famous poets he mentions not just the witness, but also the 'house', i.e. the genealogy, and the preceding and succeeding verses on which the meaning depends, or in the case of rare poems, he quotes the entire poem, cites its witness and explains the strange and the background of its origin. Thus, he preserved material important to interpretation of the ancient Arabic poetry within its cultural context.

Abd al-Qadir contributed to the conservation of the prose traditions of the Arabs, together with the scientific-literary corpus held within. He memorized the al-dawawin (collected poems) of Maqamat Badi' az-Zaman al-Hamadhani and Maqama of Al-Hariri and the histories of the Arabs, the Persians and the Turks. His writings express a liberal mind, keen awareness and deep knowledge, while they record his critical approach to received dogma. Critics called him the best scholar and preserver of the literary canon of the Arabs, their systems and prose, narrators of facts and wars and days, and the headquarters of Hariri, the Arab authors, language and poetry contained in the wonderful stories fixed in the transfer and increased in credit through his analytical criticism.

== Works ==
- Khizānat al-adab wa-lubb lubab lisān al-ʻArab (خزانة الأدب ولبّ لباب لسان العرب) 'Library of literature and door of the heart of the Arab language'; encyclopaedia on Arabic sciences and literature (13 vols.).
- Sharah Shawāhid ar-Raḍī ‘alā ash-Shafīa (شرح شواهد الرضي على الشافية) – ‘Analysis on the Evidence of Healing.’
- Al-Hashiat alā Sharah Bānat Su’ad lī Ibn Hisham (الحاشية على شرح بانت سعاد لابن هشام) – Footnote to Commentary on Bānat Su’ad by Ibn Hisham.’ (Manuscript)
- Sharah ash-Shahdī al-Jama’ bayn al-Fārisī wa’l-Turkī (شرح الشاهدي الجامع بين الفارسي والتركي) – ‘Commentary View Between the Persian and Turkish.’
- Sharah shawahid Sharah at-Tuhfat al-Wardia (شرح شواهد شرح التحفة الوردية) ‘- ‘Commentary on View of Commentary of the Rose Masterpiece.’
- Risālat fī Manā at-Talmīdh (رسالة في معنى التلميذ) – ‘Letter on the Meaning of Study.’

== Non-Arabic Works ==
- Shahnamah (in Turkish)
- Explanation of the masterpiece of the witness (in Turkish)

== Sources ==
shamela.ws.Abd al-Qadir al-Baghdādī (Arabic)

www.adab.com.Abd al-Qadir al-Baghdādī (Arabic)

== See also ==
- List of Arab scientists and scholars
- Encyclopædia Britannica Online
