= Balkan Wars Memorial Cemetery in Edirne =

Cemetery in Turkey

- Edirne Balkan Savaşı Şehitliği
- Turkey
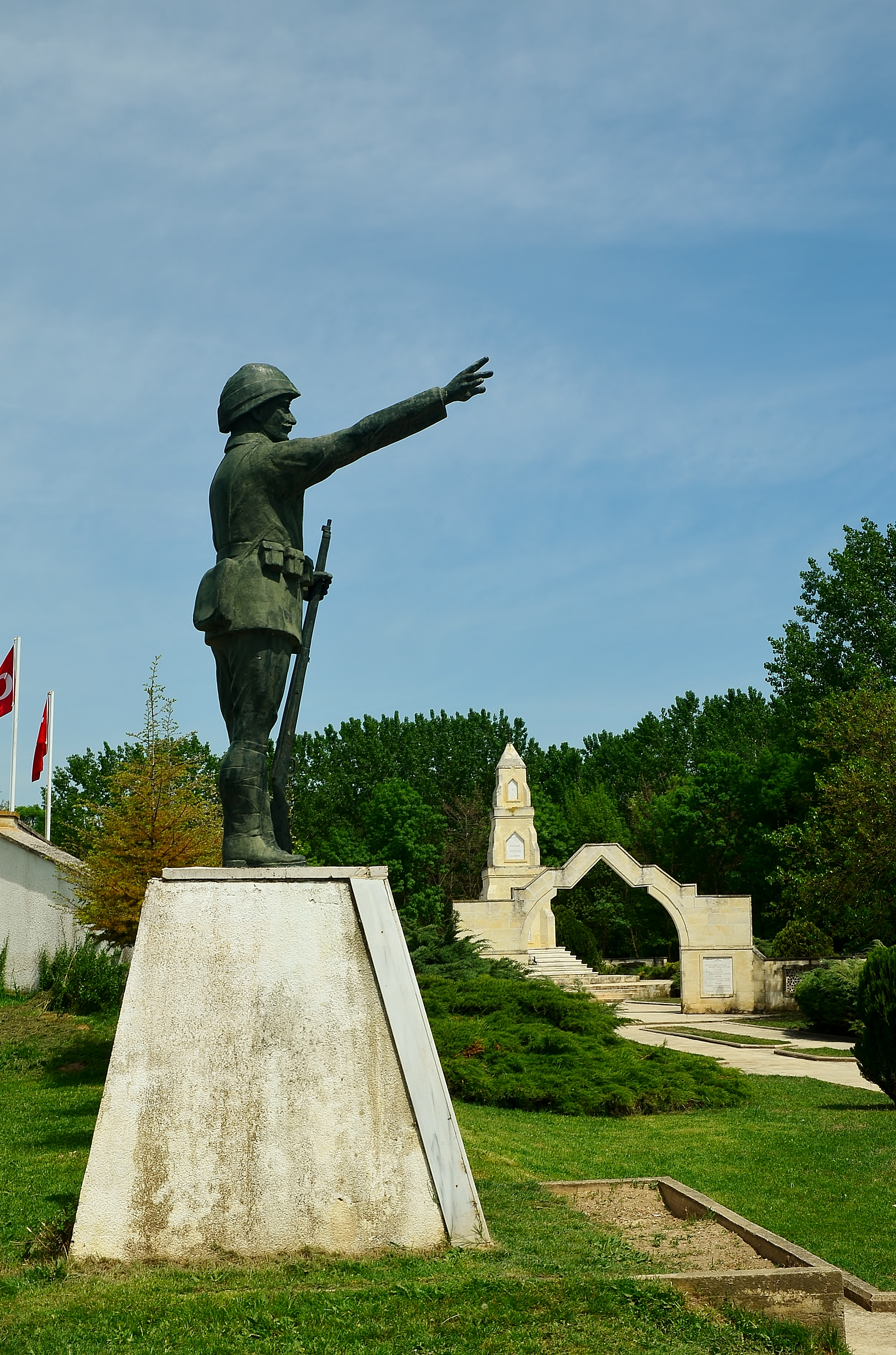
- Monument of Unknown Soldier in front of the Balkan Wars Memorial Cemetery in Edirne.
- For Turkish military and civilian casualties
- Established: January 14, 1994; 32 years ago
- Location: 41.69085°N 26.55733°E; Sarayiçi near Edirne
- Designed by: Nejat Dinçel

Burials by war
- Balkan Wars

Location of Balkan Wars Memorial Cemetery in Edirne

The Balkan Wars Memorial Cemetery in Edirne (Turkish: Edirne Balkan Savaşı Şehitliği), located at Sarayiçi quarter of Edirne, Turkey, is a memorial burial ground for Ottoman military personnel of the Balkan Wars (1912–1913), who were killed in action during the Siege of Adrianople (1912–13). It was opened to public on January 14, 1994.

Situated on the west bank of the Tunca north of Edirne, the memorial cemetery is laid out over 858 m^{2} (9,240 sq ft). Designed by architect Nejat Dinçel and built as a Tomb of the Unknown Soldier, it contains in twelve blocks the names of 100 officers and 400 soldiers on plaques.

In front of the memorial cemetery, an unknown-soldier monument with a bronze statue of an Ottoman soldier (Turkish: Mehmetçik) is erected, which was created by sculptor Tankut Öktem. The reliefs in the memorial depicting the Balkan Wars are of Metin Yurdanur.

== Background ==
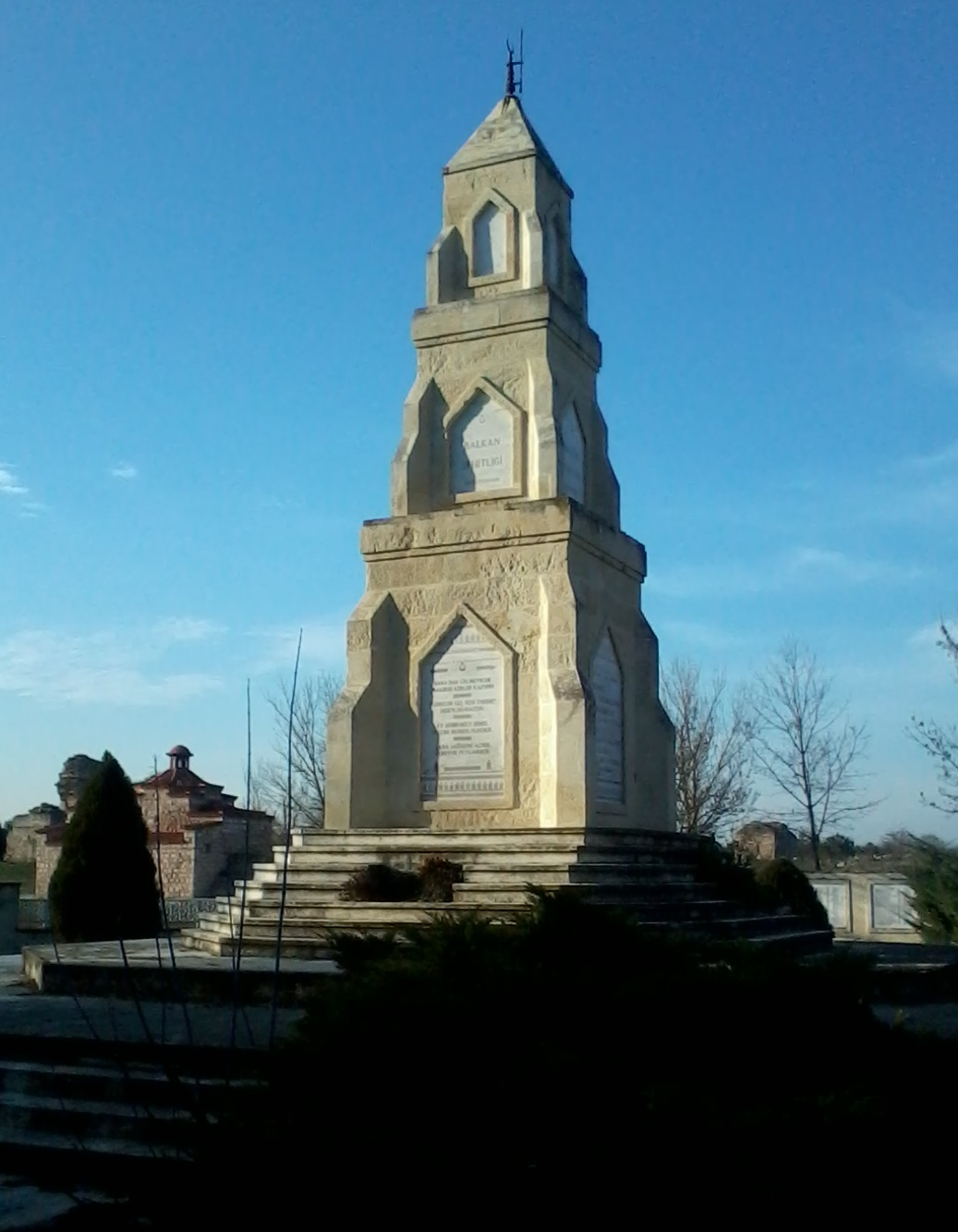
Monument in the Balkan Wars Memorial Cemetery in Edirne.

After Edirne (then known in English as "Adrianople") was captured by the Bulgarian 2nd Army on March 26, 1913, Turkish prisoners of war (POW) were put in a camp at Sarayiçi, who were treated with brutality, which is the reason why sometimes it is called concentration camp. Only the names of few military personnel could be determined from the records of the General Staff. While officers were taken to Sofia and Plovdiv, rankless soldiers (er) were held in Sarayiçi. Here they passed hard days; because of hunger they began to eat the barks of the trees. They spent almost a month there, where they did not have clothing and food. Very few prisoners had blankets, and food was provided once every 3–4 days. The plight of the soldiers was seen and documented by various Europeans such as Georges Scott, Gustave Cirilli, Pierre Loti, and articles were written in European newspapers such as in the Jurnal, Vossische Zeitung, and L'illustration. This is how Gustave Cirlli describes the situation of Ottoman POW and civilian prisoners:

Long queues of prisoners can be seen passing through the streets with their officers at their heads. They are pale, worried, with sunken cheeks due to long hunger, they are in distress, they are skin and bones. They are executed with rifles, punches and kicks, as if they are despicable animals. They [Bulgarians] gather them all outside the city, on the Tunca River, at a place called the Old Palace, where they are left to die of cold or hunger unless a bullet ends their suffering.

Dead captives were not buried, which led to the spread of disease not only in Sarayiçi, but throughout the city; measures against the spread of diseases such as cholera and typhus were not taken.

Around 10,000 POWs died due to cold, sickness and starvation. Other estimates suggest 20,000 (or 15,000 POW and 5,000 civilians), which is the most popular view. But because of the brutality, the view that the number of death POW and civilians was around 30,000-40,000 was spread among the people of Edirne, which is not true.

Every March 26, citizens gather in front of the monument to honor the memory of the thousands of prisoners and civilians who died. On March 26, 2015, the 102nd anniversary of the fall of the city was commemorated at the memorial cemetery.

Difficult conditions and high mortality have led some Turkish historians, such as İlker Alp, to call the event a genocide.
