= Ayşe Sultan (daughter of Mustafa II) =

Daughter of Ottoman Sultan Mustafa II

- Born: 30 April 1696; Edirne Palace, Edirne, Ottoman Empire or Belgrade, Ottoman Serbia
- Died: 26 September 1752 (aged 56); Constantinople, Ottoman Empire (now Istanbul, Turkey)
- Burial: Mausoleum of Turhan Sultan, New Mosque, Istanbul
- Spouse: Köprülüzade Numan Pasha (m. 1708; died 1719) Silahdar Ibrahim Pasha (m. 1720; died 1722) Koca Mustafa Pasha (m. 1725; died 1728)
- Native name: Ottoman Turkish: عائشه سلطان
- Dynasty: Ottoman
- Father: Mustafa II
- Religion: Sunni Islam

Ayşe Sultan (Ottoman Turkish: عائشه سلطان; 30 April 1696 – 26 September 1752), nicknamed Büyük Ayşe (Ayşe the Elder), was an Ottoman princess, daughter of Sultan Mustafa II and a half-sister of Sultans Mahmud I and Osman III of the Ottoman Empire.

== Life ==
=== Birth ===
Ayşe Sultan was born on 30 April 1696 at the Edirne Palace or Belgrade. At the time of her birth, her father was traveling to Austria and part of his harem awaited him in Belgrade, while the rest remained in Edirne. Therefore Ayşe could have been born in Belgrade or Edirne.

She was the eldest child of Sultan Mustafa II. She was nicknamed Büyük Ayşe, meaning Ayşe "the elder", to distinguish her from her cousin, Ayşe "the younger" (Küçük Ayşe), daughter of Ahmed III.

In 1703 her father was deposed in favour of his younger brother Ahmed III and she, with her half-sisters, was locked up in the Old Palace until her marriage.

=== Marriages ===
On 8 April 1708, Ayşe Sultan was married to Fazıl Mustafa Pasha's son Köprülüzade Numan Pasha, then the governor of Belgrade, to whom she had remained betrothed since she was seven. Her dowry was 20,000 ducats. The wedding was held together with that of his half-sister Emine Sultan. A month later, after sending on her trousseau, Ayşe and her equally magnificent procession left for the Zeyrek Palace that had been allocated to her. But instead of accompanying Ayşe Sultan all the way to Zeyrek, a neighbourhood to the northwest of the Valens Aqueduct, the dignitaries went only as far as the grand vezir's palace. From this point onwards, the more functional core of the procession, comprising the princess and her trousseau, was taken to the Zeyrek palace in a relatively quiet and unostentatious way. The marriage was consummated in March 1710.

Numan Pasha became the grand vizier in 1710, and some months later he became the governor of Crete, where he died in 1719.

After Numan Pasha's death, Ayşe on 6 February 1720 was married secondly to Silahdar Tezkireci Ibrahim Pasha, previously a sword-bearer of Sultan Ahmed II. The marriage was consummated on 20 August 1720. Ayşe became a widow again in 1722.

Following Ibrahim Pasha's death, she married Koca Mustafa Pasha on 18 August 1725. Mustafa Pasha died in 1728.

There are no known children born from these marriages.

After the death of her third husband, Ayşe decided not to remarry and spent the rest of her life in her palace in Constantinople.

== Death ==
Ayşe Sultan died on 26 September 1752 at the age of 56, and was buried next to father in her great-grandmother Turhan Sultan's mausoleum, located at New Mosque at Eminönü in Istanbul, Turkey. Following her death, her palace was allocated to her cousin Ayşe Sultan "the Younger" .

== See also ==
- List of Ottoman princesses

== Sources ==
- Duindam, Jeroen; Artan, Tülay; Kunt, Metin (August 11, 2011). Royal Courts in Dynastic States and Empires: A Global Perspective. BRILL. ISBN 978-9-004-20622-9.
- Sakaoğlu, Necdet (2008). Bu mülkün kadın sultanları: Vâlide sultanlar, hâtunlar, hasekiler, kadınefendiler, sultanefendiler. Oğlak Yayıncılık. ISBN 978-9-753-29623-6.
- Uluçay, Mustafa Çağatay (2011). Padişahların kadınları ve kızları. Ankara: Ötüken. ISBN 978-9-754-37840-5.
