= Mustafa II =

Sultan of the Ottoman Empire from 1695 to 1703

- Custodian of the Two Holy Mosques
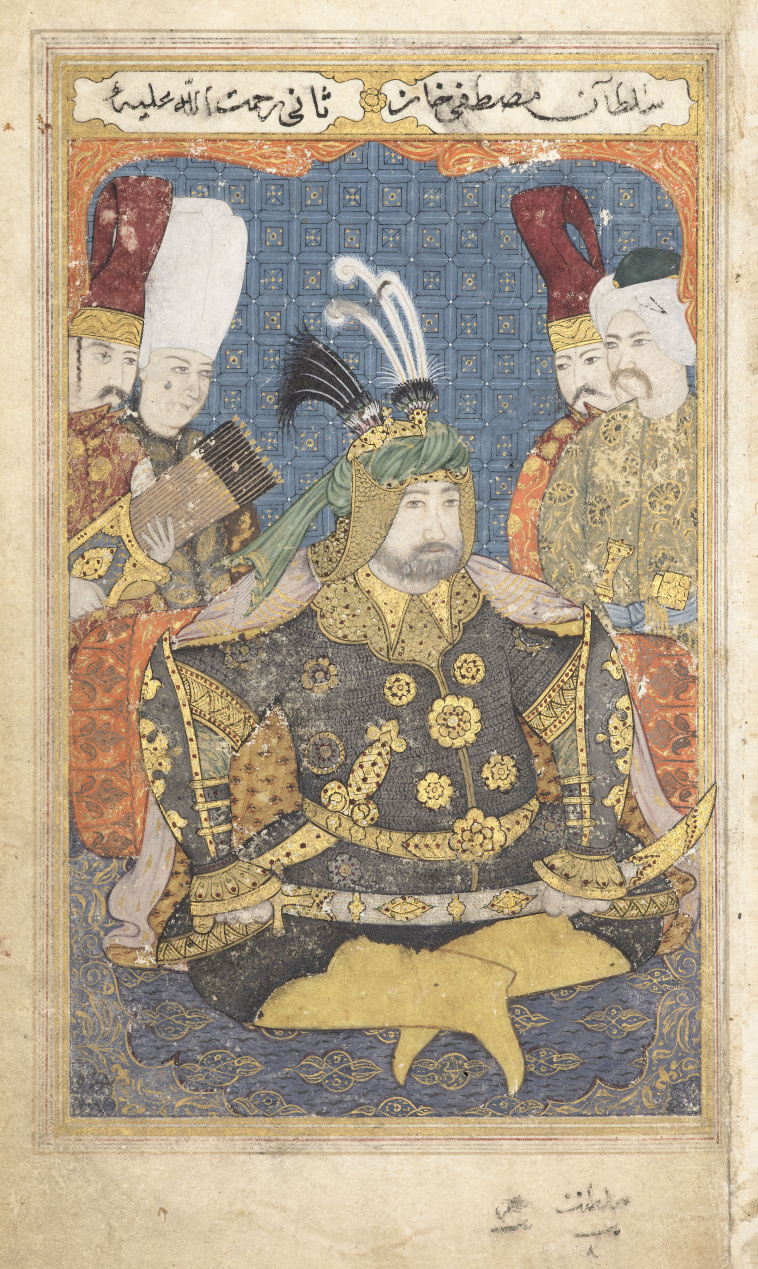
- Portrait of Mustafa II dressed in full armour, by Abdulcelil Levni, early 18th century

Sultan of the Ottoman Empire (Padishah)
- Reign: 6 February 1695 – 22 August 1703
- Predecessor: Ahmed II
- Successor: Ahmed III

Ottoman Caliph (Amir al-Mu'minin)
- Predecessor: Ahmed II
- Successor: Ahmed III
- Born: 6 February 1664; Edirne Palace, Edirne, Ottoman Empire
- Died: 29 December 1703 (aged 39); Topkapı Palace, Constantinople, Ottoman Empire
- Burial: Tomb of Turhan Sultan, New Mosque, Istanbul, Turkey
- Consorts: Alicenab Kadin; Afife Kadin; Saliha Kadin; Şehsuvar Kadin; Others
- Issue Among others: Ayşe Sultan; Mahmud I; Emine Sultan; Safiye Sultan; Osman III; Emetullah Sultan
Names
- Mustafa bin Mehmed
- Dynasty: Ottoman
- Father: Mehmed IV
- Mother: Gülnuş Sultan
- Religion: Sunni Islam
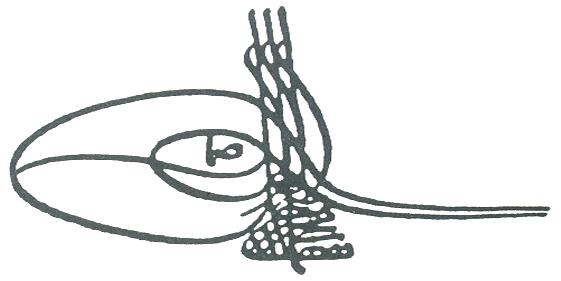
- Tughra

Mustafa II (/ˈmʊstəfə/; Ottoman Turkish: مصطفى ثانى Muṣṭafā-yi sānī; 6 February 1664 – 29 December 1703) was the sultan of the Ottoman Empire from 1695 to 1703.

== Early life ==
He was born at Edirne Palace on 6 February 1664. He was the son of Sultan Mehmed IV (1648–87) and Gülnuş Sultan, originally named Evmania/Eugenie, who was of Greek descent.

Much of Mustafa's childhood was passed in Edirne, the city of his birth. While he was in Mora Yenişehiri with his father in 1669, he began his religious education under Vani Mehmed Efendi, undergoing the bed-i besmele ceremony. The writing teacher was the famous calligrapher Hâfiz Osman. In 1675, he and his brother Ahmed were circumcised and his sisters Hatice Sultan and Fatma Emetullah Sultan were married. The celebration lasted 20 days.

== Reign ==
=== Great Turkish War ===
During his reign the Great Turkish War, which had started in 1683, was still going on. After the failure of the second Siege of Vienna (1683) the Holy League had captured large parts of the Empire's territory in Europe. The Habsburg armies came as far as Niš, modern-day Serbia, before being pushed back across the Danube by 1690. Sultan Mustafa II was determined to recapture the lost territories in Hungary and therefore he personally commanded his armies. He set out from Niš with a large Ottoman Army to campaign against the Holy League.

=== Capture of Chios ===
First, the Ottoman Navy recaptured the island of Chios after defeating the Venetian navy twice, in the Battle of the Oinousses Islands (1695) and in the Battle of Chios (1695), in February 1695. In June 1695, Mustafa II left Edirne for his first military campaign against the Habsburg Empire. By September 1695 the town of Lipova was captured. On 18 September 1695 the Venetian navy was again defeated in the naval victory of Zeytinburnu. A few days later the Habsburg army was defeated in the Battle of Lugos. Afterwards the Ottoman Army returned to the capital. Meanwhile, the Ottoman fortress in Azov was successfully defended against the besieging Russian forces.

As Mustafa attempted to realize his plans quickly, the island of Chios, which had previously fallen into the hands of the Venetians, was taken back at that time, the Crimean Tatars Shahbaz Giray entered the territory of Poland and proceeded to Lvov (Lviv), and returned with many captives and booty. There were reports that the Venetians were influenced by the Ottoman forces on the Herzegovina front in Peloponnese. The recovery of Chios was considered especially auspicious and was celebrated with great festivities in Edirne. Meanwhile, the tips of the people were distributed to the locals.

=== Habsburg wars ===
In April 1696 Mustafa II left Edirne for his second military campaign against the Habsburg Empire. In August 1696 the Russians besieged Azov for the second time and captured the fortress. In August 1696 the Ottoman troops defeated the Habsburg army in the Battle of Ulaş and in the Battle of Cenei. After these victories the Ottoman troops captured Timișoara and Koca Cafer Pasha was appointed as the protector of Belgrade. Afterwards the army returned to the Ottoman capital.

In June 1697 Mustafa II left the capital on his third military campaign against the Habsburg Empire. However, the Sultan and Ottoman Army suffered a crushing defeat in the Battle of Zenta and Grand Vizier Elmas Mehmed Pasha died in the battle. Afterwards the Ottomans signed a treaty with the Holy League.

The most traumatic event of his reign was the loss of Hungary by the Treaty of Karlowitz in 1699.

Yet even if Ottoman power seemed to wane on one side of the empire, this did not mean that Ottoman efforts at expansion ceased. In 1700, for example, the Grand Vizier Amcazade Hüseyin boasted to a recalcitrant tribe residing in swamps near Baghdad that they ought to abide by the sultan's rule, since his grasp extended even to their marshy redoubts. The Grand Vizier added that, after all, Mustafa II was "the Lord of Water and Mud."

At the end of his reign, Mustafa II sought to restore power to the sultanate, which had been an increasingly symbolic position since the middle of the 17th century, when Mehmed IV had signed over his executive powers to the Grand Vizier. Mustafa II's strategy was to create an alternative base of power for himself by making the position of timars, the Ottoman cavalrymen, hereditary and thus loyal to him. The timars, however, were at this point increasingly an obsolete part of the Ottoman military machine.

=== Deposition ===
The stratagem failed, the disaffected troops bound to a Georgian campaign mutinied in the capital (called the "Edirne event" by historians), and Mustafa was deposed on 22 August 1703.

== Character ==
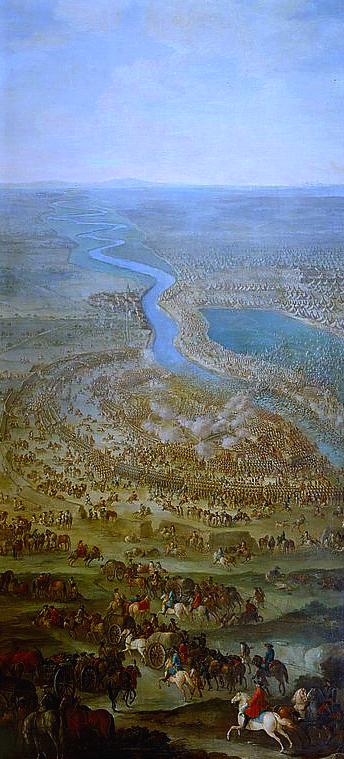
Battle of Zenta

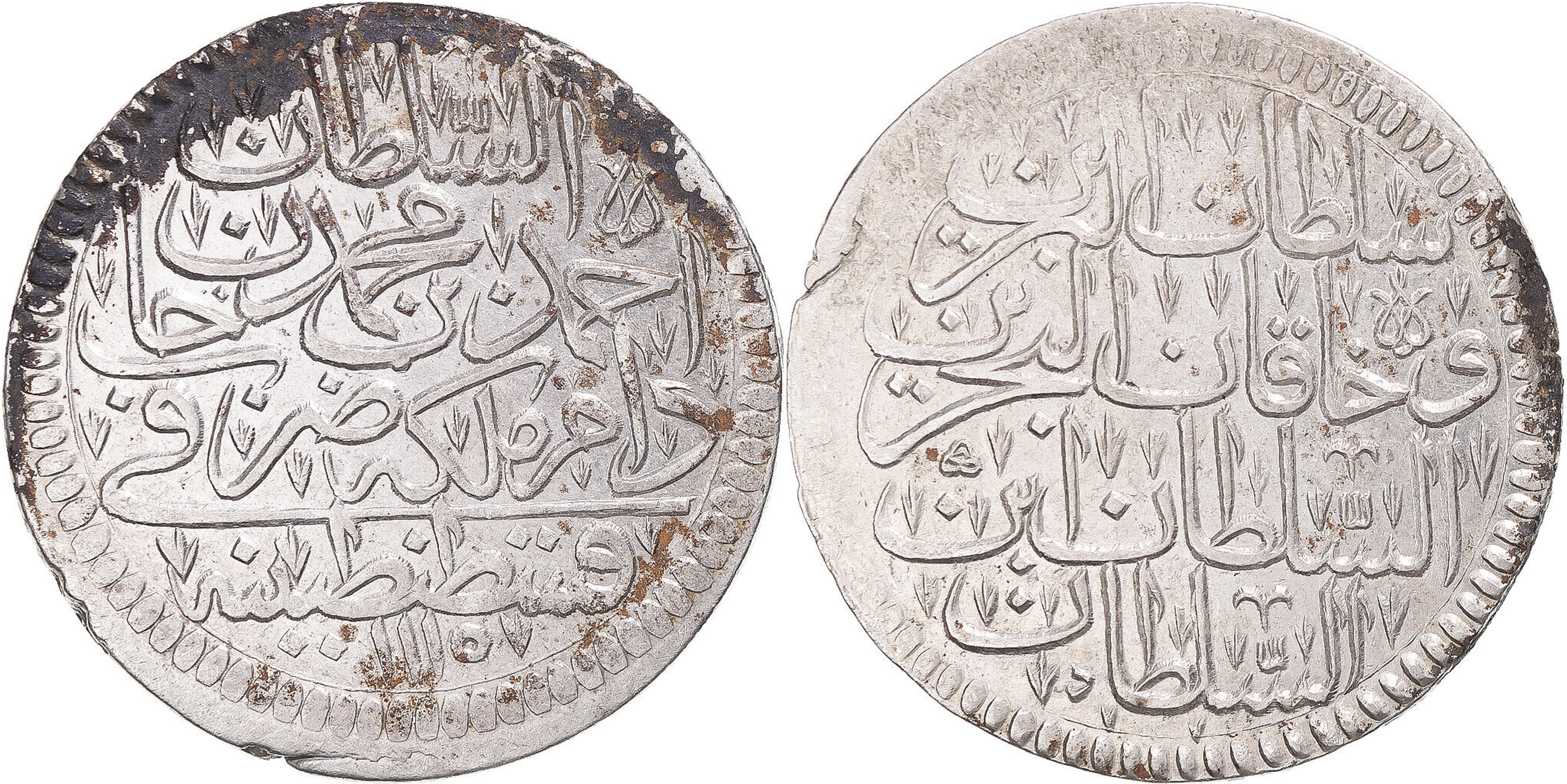
Silver coin 1 kurus Mustafa II, 1695

Defined as having a red beard, a short neck, he was of medium height and majestic. Mustafa II has a miniature made by Levni. After 1699, like his father, he was interested in hunting and entertainment, engaged in literature and wrote poems with the pseudonym. A curiosity of this sultan, who had lines in the style of Celi, Nesih and Sulus was archery. Silahdar Findiklili Mehmed Agha, who was assigned to write the history of his period. He described Mustafa's reign in his book Nusretname.

== Family ==
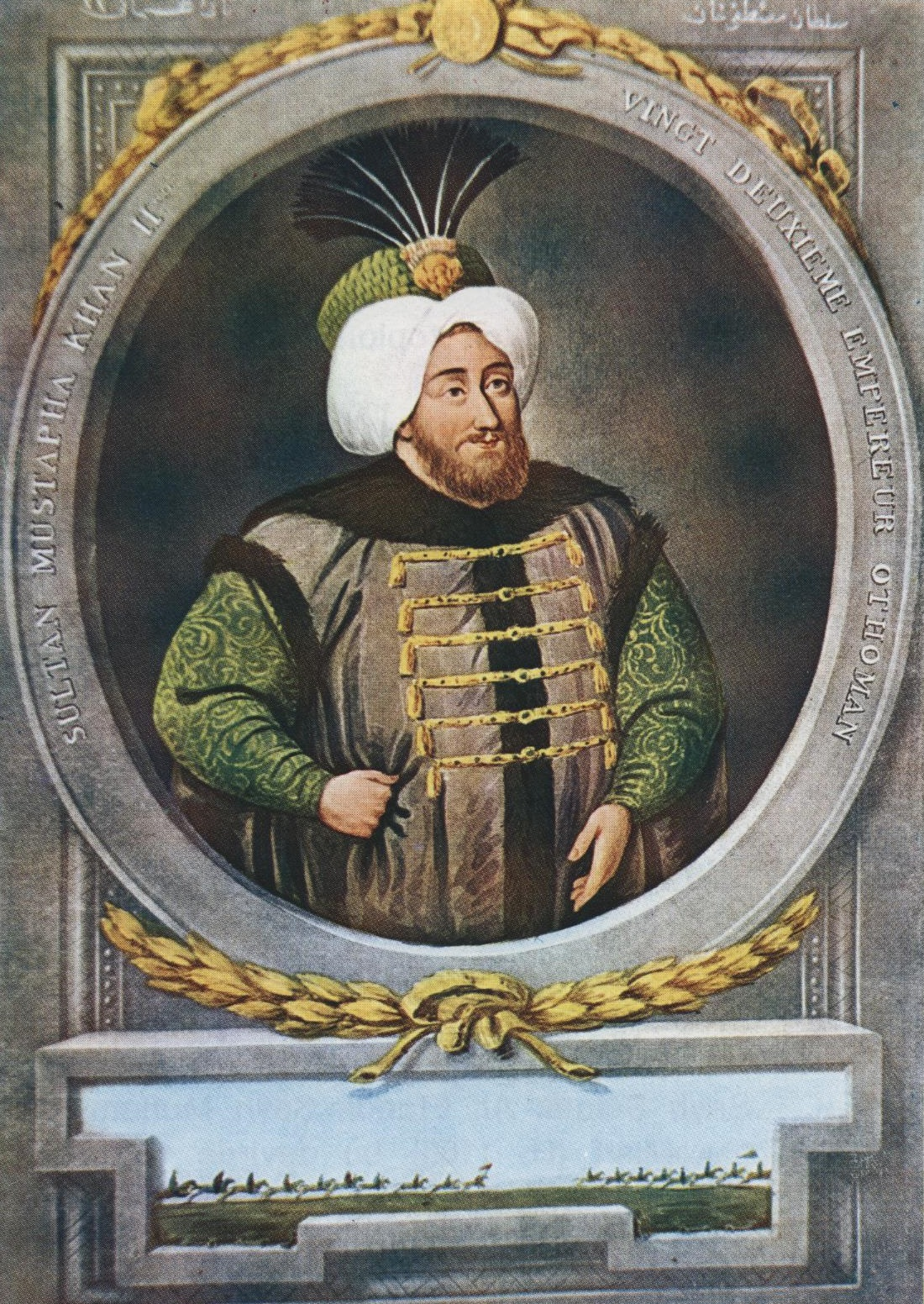
Sultan Mustafa II by Konstantin Kapıdağlı

With the rise of Mustafa II, the title of "Haseki Sultan" was definitively abolished, to be permanently replaced by the less prestigious and not exclusive "Kadın" (imperial consort). Mustafa II also created a new class of concubines, the "Ikbal": inferior in rank to the Kadın in the hierarchy of the harem, they were initially called with the normal title of "Hatun" (woman), later modified in that, superior, of "Hanim" (lady).

Several of his concubines and consorts were married after his deposition by order of the new sultan, his brother Ahmed III.

=== Consorts ===
Mustafa II had at least ten consorts:

- Alicenab Kadın (died 20 April 1699, Edirne Palace, Edirne, buried in Darülhadis Mosque). BaşKadin (first imperial consort) until her death.
- Afife Kadın (c. 1682 – 12 June 1723). BaşKadin after Alicenab's death. Also called Hafife, Hafiten, Hafize, Hafise or Hafsa, she was Mustafa's most loved consort, sentiment reciprocated, even if they were never legally married. She had a daughter in 1696 and later became the mother of five of Mustafa's eight sons.
- Saliha Kadın (died 21 September 1739, Tırnakçı Palace, Istanbul, buried in Turhan Sultan Mausoleum, New Mosque). She was mother and Valide Sultan of Mahmud I.
- Şehsuvar Kadın (died 27 April 1756, Topkapı Palace, Istanbul, buried in Nuruosmaniye Mosque). She was mother and Valide Sultan of Osman III.
- Bahtiyar Kadın. One of his first concubines, she was probably the mother of one of Mustafa's oldest daughters.
- Ivaz Kadın. Mentioned as a Kadin in a document dated 1696/1697, she was probably the mother of one of Mustafa's oldest daughters.
- Hatice Kadin. Before becoming a consort, she was a high-ranking harem lady-in-waiting.
- Hüsnüşah Kadın. She died on 1 January 1700.
- Fatma Şahin Hatun, then Hanim. Baş Ikbal (first ikbal). After Mustafa's deposition she was removed from the harem and married by order of Ahmed III.
- Hanife Hatun, then Hanim. After Mustafa's deposition she was removed from the harem and married by order of Ahmed III. From her new husband she had a son named Ibrahim and a daughter.

=== Sons ===
Mustafa II had at least eight sons, including five who died as infants with Afife Kadın:

- Mahmud I (2 August 1696 – 13 December 1754) – with Saliha Kadin. 24th Sultan of the Ottoman Empire.
- Şehzade Mehmed (27 November 1698 – 3 June 1703, Edirne Palace, Edirne, buried in Turhan Sultan's türbe, New Mosque) – with Afife Kadın. He was the favorite son of Mustafa II, who suffered his death immensely.
- Osman III (2 January 1699 – 30 October 1757) – with Şehsuvar Kadin. 25th Sultan of the Ottoman Empire.
- Şehzade Hasan (28 March 1699 – 25 May 1733). He became heir to the throne in 1730 and spent most of his life locked up in the Kafes, where he finally died.
- Şehzade Hüseyn (16 May 1699 – 19 September 1700, Edirne Palace, Edirne, buried in New Mosque) – with Afife Kadın.
- Şehzade Selim (16 May 1700 – 8 June 1702, Edirne Palace, Edirne, buried in Turhan Sultan's turbe New Mosque) – with Afife Kadın.
- Şehzade Ahmed (3 March 1702 – 7 September 1703, Edirne Palace, Edirne, buried in Darülhadis Mosque) – with Afife Kadın.
- Şehzade Suleyman (25 December 1703 – 25 December 1703, Edirne Palace, Edirne, buried in Turhan Sultan's turbe New Mosque) – with Afife Kadın. Stillbirth. Four days after, Mustafa II died, too.

=== Daughters ===
Mustafa II had at least twelve daughters, of which one, among the three eldest, with Afife Kadin:

- Ayşe Sultan (30 April 1696 – 26 September 1752, Istanbul, buried in New Mosque). Nicknamed "the eldest" to distinguish her from her cousin Ayşe Sultan "the younger", daughter of Ahmed III. She married three times, but had no children.
- Emine Sultan (1 September 1696 –1739, Istanbul, buried in New Mosque). She married four times, but had no children.
- Safiye Sultan (13 October 1696 – 15 May 1778, Istanbul, buried in New Mosque) - maybe with Afife Kadin. She married four times and had three sons and a daughter.
- Atike Sultan (1695/6 – 17??)-with Alicenab Baskadın.She died in infancy.
- Hatice Sultan (15 March 1698 – before 1703, Edirne Palace, Edirne, buried in Darülhadis Mosque).
- Rukiye Sultan (13 November 1698 – 28 March 1699, Edirne Palace, Edirne, buried in Darülhadis Mosque).
- Rukiye Ismihan Sultan (20 April 1699 – 24 December 1703, Istanbul, buried in New Mosque)-with Alicenab Başkadın. Her father promised her in wife to Maktülzade Ali Paşah, but the baby girl died before being able to celebrate the wedding.
- Fatma Sultan (8 October 1699 – 20 May 1700, Istanbul, buried in New Mosque).
- Ümmügülsüm Sultan (10 June 1700 – 2 May 1701, Edirne Palace, Edirne, buried in Darülhadis Mosque).
- Emetullah Sultan (22 June 1701 – 19 April 1727, Istanbul, buried in New Mosque) – with Şehsuvar Kadın. Also called Ümmetullah Sultan or Heybetullah Sultan. She married once and had a daughter.
- Zeynep Sultan (10 June 1703 – 18 December 1705, Istanbul, buried in New Mosque).
- Esma Sultan (? – ?). She died in infancy.

== Death ==
After the new sultan's return to Istanbul, Mustafa and his princes were brought to Istanbul in the Topkapı Palace they were locked up in the Kafes. Mustafa's cage life lasted four months. He died of either sadness or an unknown cause on 29 December 1703. He was buried next to his grandmother, Turhan Hatice Sultan, in the New Mosque, Eminönü, Istanbul, Turkey.

== Sources ==
- Abou-El-Haj, R. A. (1974). "The Narcissism of Mustafa II (1695–1703): A Psychohistorical Study". Studia Islamica (40): 115–131. doi:10.2307/1595336. JSTOR 1595336.
- Sakaoğlu, Necdet (2015). Bu Mülkün Sultanları. Alfa Yayıncılık. ISBN 978-6-051-71080-8.
- Uluçay, Mustafa Çağatay (2011). Padişahların kadınları ve kızları. Ankara: Ötüken. ISBN 978-9-754-37840-5.

Mustafa II House of Osman Born: February 6, 1664 Died: December 29, 1703[aged 39]
Regnal titles
Preceded by Ahmed II	Sultan of the Ottoman Empire; Feb 6, 1695 – August 22, 1703	Succeeded by Ahmed III
Sunni Islam titles
Preceded by Ahmed II	Caliph of the Ottoman Caliphate; Feb 6, 1695 – August 22, 1703	Succeeded by Ahmed III
