= Edirne Palace =

Ottoman palace

- Edirne Sarayı
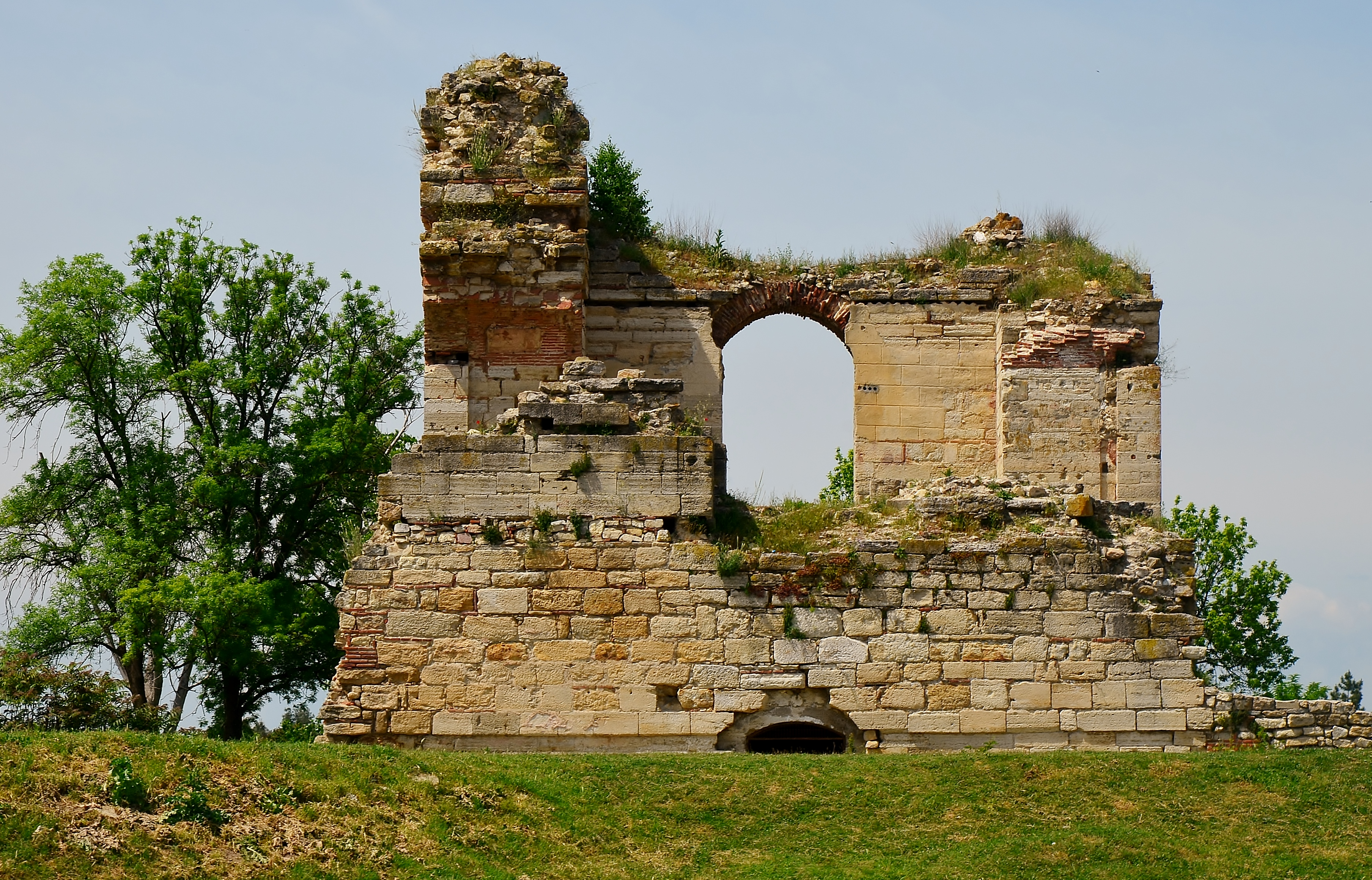
- Cihannüme Kasrı (Panoramic Pavilion), main palace ruins.

- Location within Turkey
- Alternative names: New Imperial Palace; Ottoman Turkish: Saray-ı Cedid-i Amire

General information
- Status: Ruined
- Type: 1475–1718 Palace, 1718–1768 vacant, 1768–1828 Palace, 1829 Russian camp
- Architectural style: Ottoman
- Location: Edirne, Turkey, Sarayiçi
- Coordinates: 41°41′28″N 26°33′19″E
- Construction started: 1450
- Completed: 1475
- Renovated: 1868-1873
- Destroyed: 1752 earthquake 1776 fire 1878 explosion
- Client: Ottoman sultans

Technical details
- Structural system: various buildings surrounding courtyards, pavilions and gardens
- Size: 30–35 ha (74–86 acres)

Edirne Palace (Turkish: Edirne Sarayı), or formerly New Imperial Palace (Ottoman Turkish: Saray-ı Cedid-i Amire), is a former palace of the Ottoman sultans in Edirne (then known in English as Adrianople), built during the era when the city was the capital of the empire. Few of the palace buildings have survived until now, though reconstruction works are underway.

== History ==
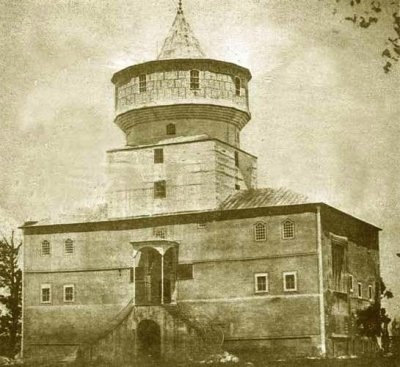
Historical photograph of Cihannüma Pavilion.

The palace was built in a hunting ground and woods covering 30–35 ha (74–86 acres) land north of the city on the west bank of the Tunca river. Construction of the palace began in 1450 during the reign of Murad II (r. 1421–1444, 1446–1451), but stopped when the sultan died. After some time, work was resumed and it was completed by Mehmed the Conqueror (r. 1444–1446, 1451–1481) in 1475. In the following years, the palace was continuously maintained and extended with new buildings around it during the reigns of Suleiman the Magnificent (r. 1520–1566), Ahmed I (r. 1603–1617), Mehmed IV (r. 1648–1687), Ahmed II (r. 1691–1695) and Ahmed III (r. 1703–1730).

The palace remained unused from 1718, when Ahmed III relocated his seat to Istanbul, until 1768, when Mustafa III (r. 1757–1774) returned to the city. During this half-century of vacancy, the palace fell into a state of dilapidation. The destruction was abetted by the 1752 earthquake and the 1776 fire in the city. In 1825, some parts of the palace were repaired by Mahmud II (r. 1808–1839). The palace was damaged heavily when the Russian forces occupying Edirne in 1829 used it as a military camp. Between 1868 and 1873, many buildings of the palace complex underwent restoration by the city governors of the time. Finally, the palace was destroyed to great extent when an ammunition depot close by was intentionally blown up on the order of the Governor of Edirne, in fear of nearing Russian forces during the Russo-Turkish War of 1877–78. The structural elements of the ruined palace were then plundered to be used elsewhere.

Archaeologist Mustafa Özer of Bahçeşehir University, who leads the excavation works at site, reported that they obtained some photographs of the palace complex taken before its destruction. It is believed that Russian photographer Dmitri Ivanovich Yermakov (1846–1916), who, according to historical records, took part in the Russo-Turkish War of 1877–78 as an army topographist, visited Edirne for intelligence purposes in the 1870s, and photographed the city street by street. Özer stresses the importance of the palace photos for the rebuilding and restoration works, and believes that more photos exist.

== Modern status ==
Restoration and redevelopment (2022–present) Since 2022, the Edirne Palace (Saray-ı Cedid-i Amire) has been undergoing thorough restoration. The project aims to revive the Palace, which was largely destroyed during the 19th century. Status and Timeline: As of 2026, the project is approximately 50% complete. Structural restoration of the 11 main buildings is expected to conclude by late 2027, with a full public opening scheduled for 2028.

== Palace facilities ==
The palace complex consisted of 72 different buildings with 117 rooms, 14 mansions, 18 bathhouses, 8 masjids or mosques, 17 gates and 13 cellars. At the time of its glory, around 34,000 people living in the palace area were served by about 6,000 servants.

The main building of the palace was called "Cihannüma Kasrı" (literally: Panoramic Pavilion), aka Taht-ı Hümayun (literally: Imperial Throne), consisting of sultan's room, flag room, library, masjid and other rooms. To the south of the pavilion, three adjacent pavilions were added for Mehmed IV, Mustafa II and Ahmed III. As a continuation to those buildings, there were harem rooms for the valide sultan (queen mother), the four sultan wives, the şehzade (princes), the cariye (odalisque), the officers and guards, an infirmary and a reception hall. West to the pavilion in front of the reception hall, was situated the "Felicity Gate" ("Bab üs-Sa'ade") or "White Aghas' Gate" ("Ak Ağalar Kapısı"), was situated.

Structuring of the area around the palace took place with cobbling of the Tunca riverbed and building of levees on the banks of the river by Bayezid II (r. 1481–1512). Edirne Palace entered, so to speak, a second structuring era with Suleiman the Magnificent and his master architect Mimar Sinan (c. 1489/1490–1588). During this time, the palace was redesigned, its landscape topography was reorganized, and water supply problems were resolved. Mimar Sinan made running water available to the palace by a canal derived from the resource he had brought to the city of Edirne from nearby Taşlımüsellim village. In order to protect the palace from flooding through the supply water canal, the canal was constructed in the form of a circular arc around the palace, which joined Tunca River near Saraçhane Bridge. The Tunca river and the supply water canal encircled the palace area, and made so a protective wall unnecessary.

Further structures that were added include the İmadiye Pavilion by Murad IV (r. 1623–1640) as well as the Procession Pavilion, Iftar Lodge, Hunting (Bulbul) Lodge and Gardener's Lodge by Mehmed IV (r. 1648–1687).

=== Panorama Pavilion (Cihannüma Kasrı) and Felicity Gate (Bab üs-Sa'ade) ===
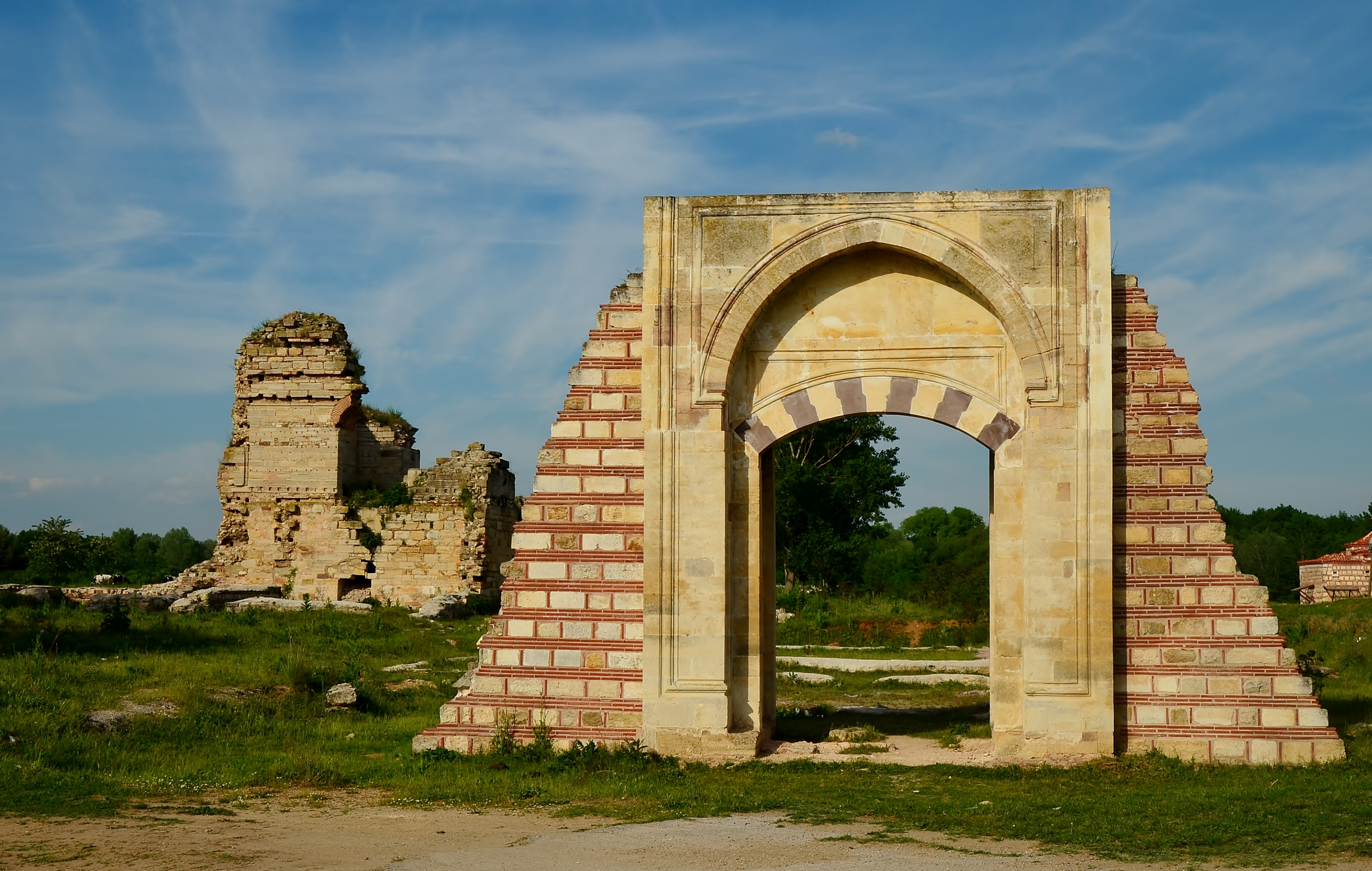
Bab üs-Sa'ade (Felicity Gate) and Cihannüma Kasrı (Panoramic Pavilion) in the background.

Particularly in 2001, archaeological works started at the palace's gate, the "Felicity Gate", and at the site of "Reception Hall". Sponsored by the National Palaces Administration, restoration works were completed in 2004. It is projected that the entire palace building will be restored for use as an International Congress Center.

Due to its architecture, Cihannüma Pavilion is the most important part of the palace complex. Built in 1450–1451, it is a seven-story building with an octagonal room atop. It consisted of "Imperial room", flag room, library and masjid. It was maintained throughout centuries, and an outside staircase was added by Abdülaziz (r. 1861–1876). Initial archaeological excavations at this site took place in 1956.

=== Sand Pavilion Bathhouse (Kum Kasrı Hamamı) ===
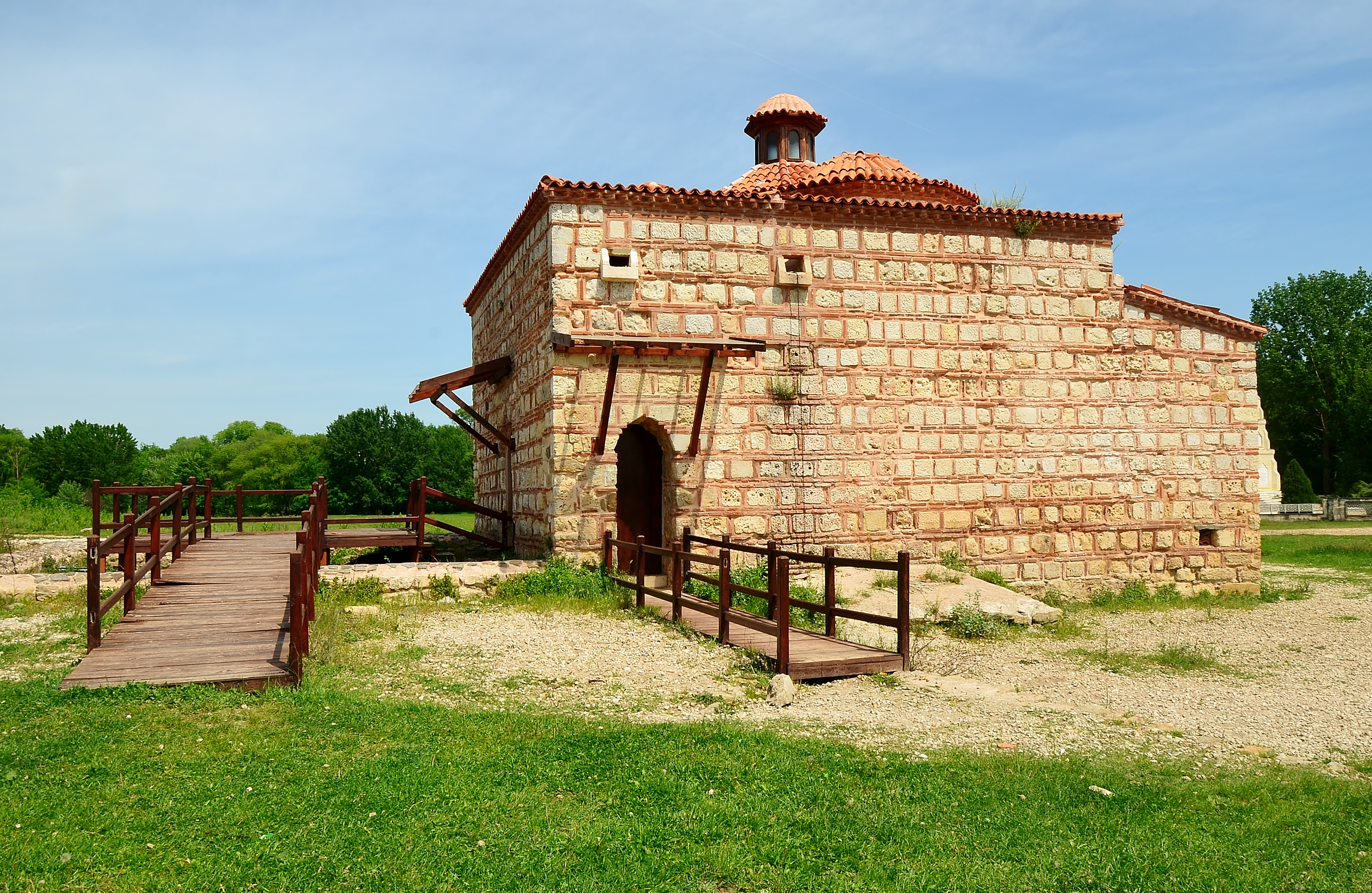
Kum Kasrı Hamamı (Sand Pavilion Bathhouse).

In 2000, archaeological works were undertaken at Kum Kasrı Hamamı (literally: Sand Pavilion Bathhouse) and around, which revealed the existence of a water supply system. Built by Mehmed the Conqueror, the simple bathhouse has three bath sections as the "sıcaklık" (caldarium), "ılıklık" (tepidarium) and "soğukluk" (frigidarium) under three small domes with an iwan at one end. The bathhouse was connected to the palace with a walkway.

=== Imperial Kitchen (Matbah-ı Amire) ===
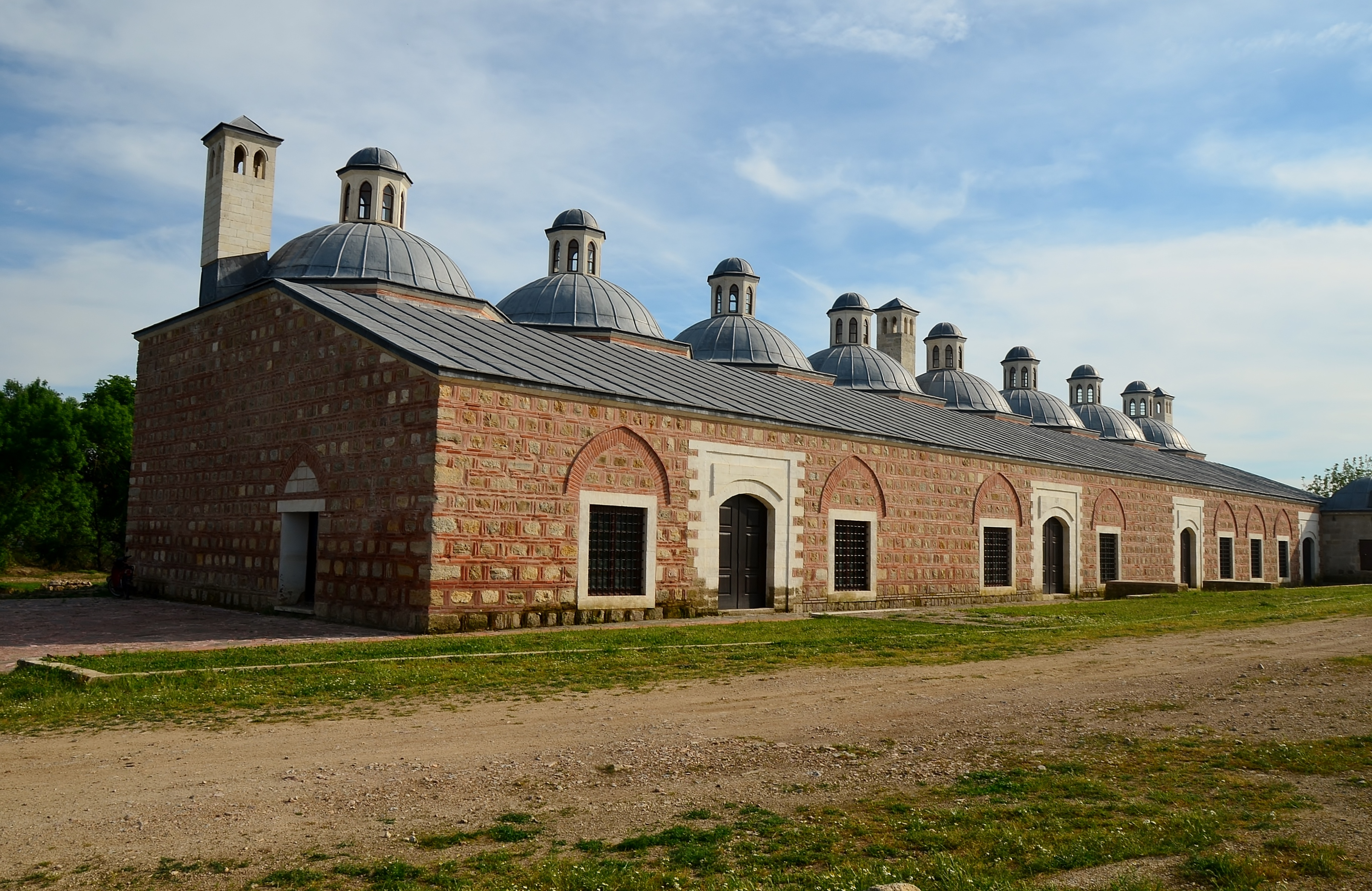
Palace kitchen

South to the main courtyard, "Matbah-ı Amire" (literally: Imperial kitchen) was situated. It is a long-stretched rectangular-plan building under eight domes. The building's north facade disappeared to a large extent. The building is restored today.

=== Justice Pavilion (Kasr-ı Adalet) ===
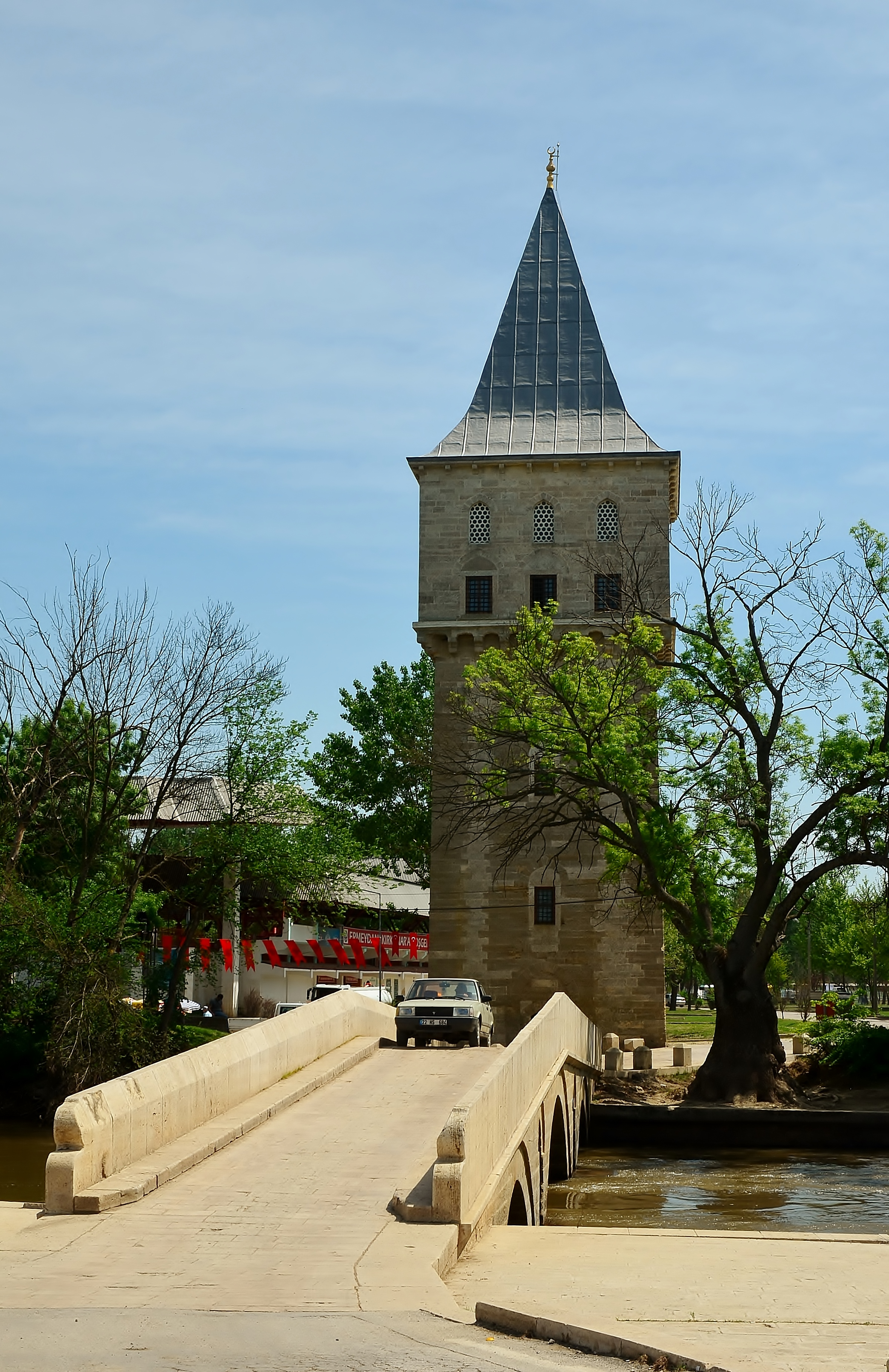
Fatih Bridge and Kasr-ı Adalet (Justice Pavilion)

Erected in 1561 by Suleiman the Magnificent, who is also known in Turkey as Suleiman the Lawmaker, the "Kasr-ı Adalet" (literally: Justice Pavilion) is the only structure as part of the palace complex, which remained intact. In the form of a rectangular tower with a pointed metal roof, it is situated next to the tiny Fatih Bridge over the Tunca river, which was built in 1452 by Mehmed the Conqueror (Turkish: Fatih Sultan Mehmet). Two stone columns still stand in front of the building. The right one, called the "Stone of Respect" (Turkish: Seng-i Hürmet), was used to hold the petitions of the people to the sultan, and the left one, named the "Stone of Warning" (Turkish: Seng-i İbret), to display the severed heads of criminals.

=== Prayer platform (Namazgah) ===
Northeast to the Kum Pavilion Hammam, a prayer platform is situated, which was built in the second half of the 16th century. Behind the mihrab there is a fountain.

=== Kanuni Bridge ===
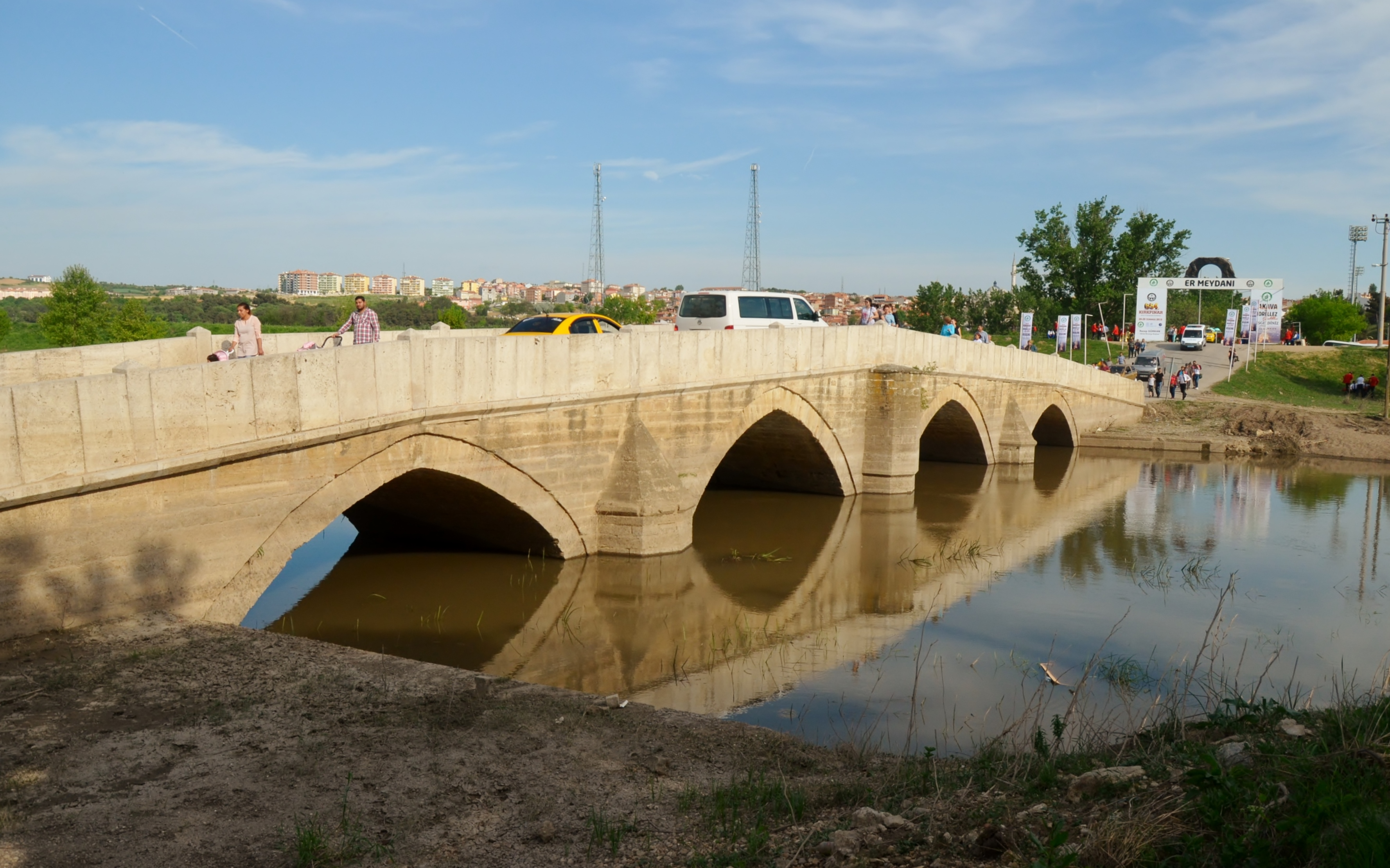
Kanuni Bridge over the Tunca river.

Named after Suleiman the Magnificent, known in Turkish as "Kanuni", "the Lawmaker", the Kanuni Bridge over the Tunca river connects the palace garden to the city. Built in 1553–1554, it is 60 m (200 ft) long and has four arches.

=== Hunting (Bulbul) Lodge (Av Köşkü) ===
Built in 1671 by Mehmed IV, aka Mehmed the Hunter, the Hunting (Bulbul) Lodge is partly intact. It is in use today after restoration in 2002.

== Vicinity ==
The Balkan Wars Memorial Cemetery is situated just east of the palace complex area.
