= Sigbert Heister =

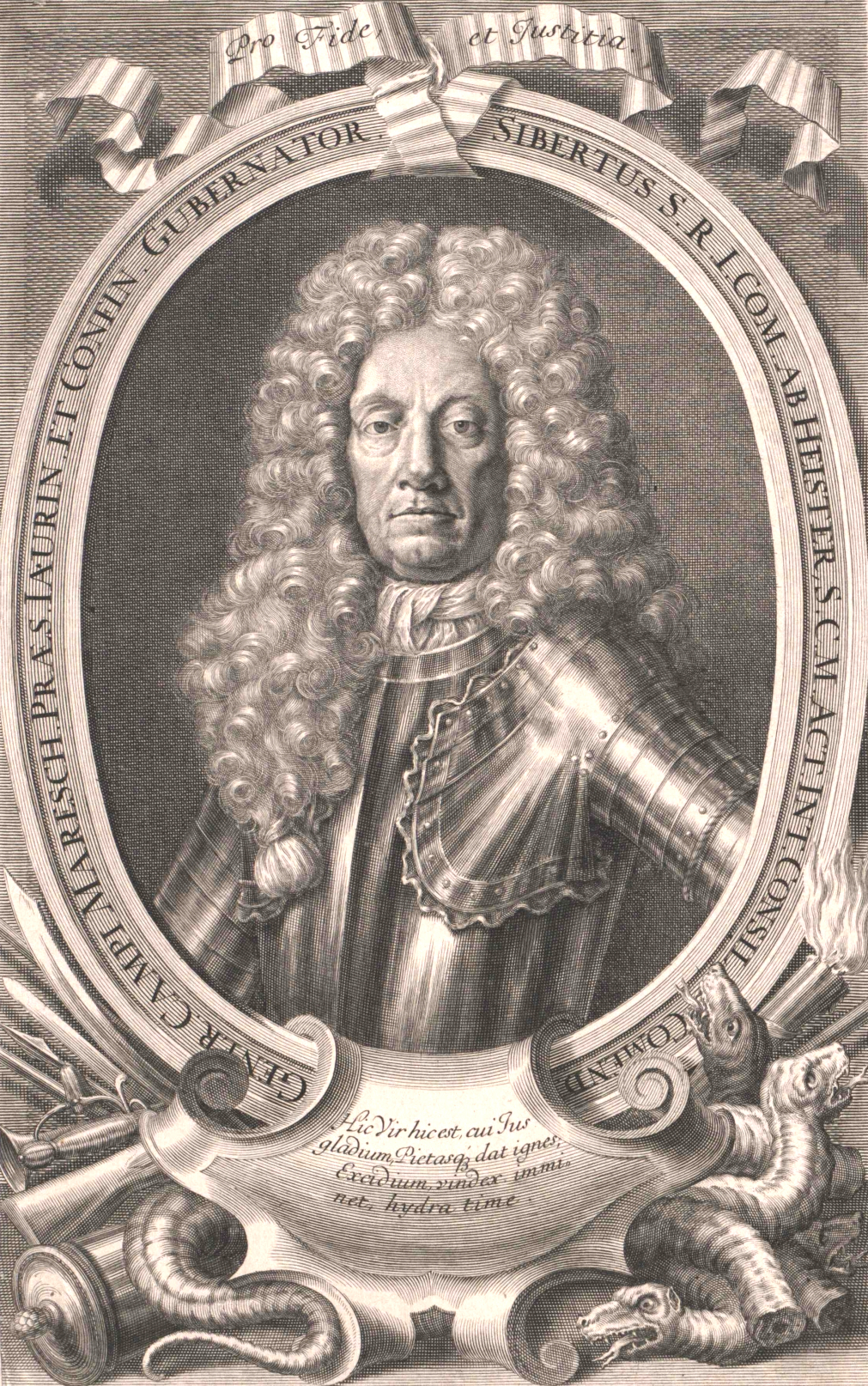
Portrait of Sigbert Heister

Sigbert Graf Heister (Kirchberg an der Raab, 1 January 1646 – Kirchberg an der Raab in Steiermark, 22 February 1718) was an Imperial Field marshal.

His father was Gottfried Heister (1609–1679), vice president of the Hofkriegsrat.

Sigbert fought in 1665 against the Turks, and later against the French. Because of his bravery and insight in combat, he reached the rank of General. He participated in the Battle of Vienna in 1683 and fought in the following Great Turkish War in Transylvania. He became General Major in 1686.

In 1689, Heister commanded the entire Infantry under Louis of Baden in the Battles of Batočina and Niš, and in 1693 he led his own army corps against the insurgents in Hungary. In 1697, Heister was one of the commanders under Eugene of Savoy, who defeated the Turks in the Battle of Zenta.

In the beginning of the War of Spanish Succession, he was deployed in 1703 in Bayern and Tirol.

After the outbreak of Rákóczi's War for Independence in Hungary, and Prince Eugene fighting the French and Bavarians in the West, Heister was put at the head of an improvised army to defend Vienna against Rákóczi's Kurucs.

Heister became Field Marshal and crushed in May 1704 a Kuruc army under Sándor Károlyi near St. Niclas. He fought many more battles against the insurgents, winning victories at Győr (22 June 1704) and Trnava (26 December 1704) and pushed ruthlessly the fighting back into Hungary. His harshness was not appreciated in Vienna, where the Court still hoped to come to a negotiated peace with Rákóczi. He was replaced by General d´Erbeville and sent to Italy in 1706.

In 1708 the situation in Hungary was still not under control, and Heister was reappointed at the head of the army. Here he won the decisive Battle of Trenčín, but was again replaced by the more diplomatic Johann Pálffy, who finally negotiated the end of the war in 1711.

Heister served one more time in the Austro-Turkish War of 1716–18. After failing to besiege Novi, he played an important role in the capture of Belgrad on 22 August 1717. Heister's son was killed in the siege.

The next year, Heister died in his palace in Kirchberg.
