= Siege of Temeşvar (1716) =

1716 siege during the Austro-Turkish War of 1716-1718

Siege of Temeşvar (Timișoara)
- Part of the Austro-Turkish War (1716–1718)
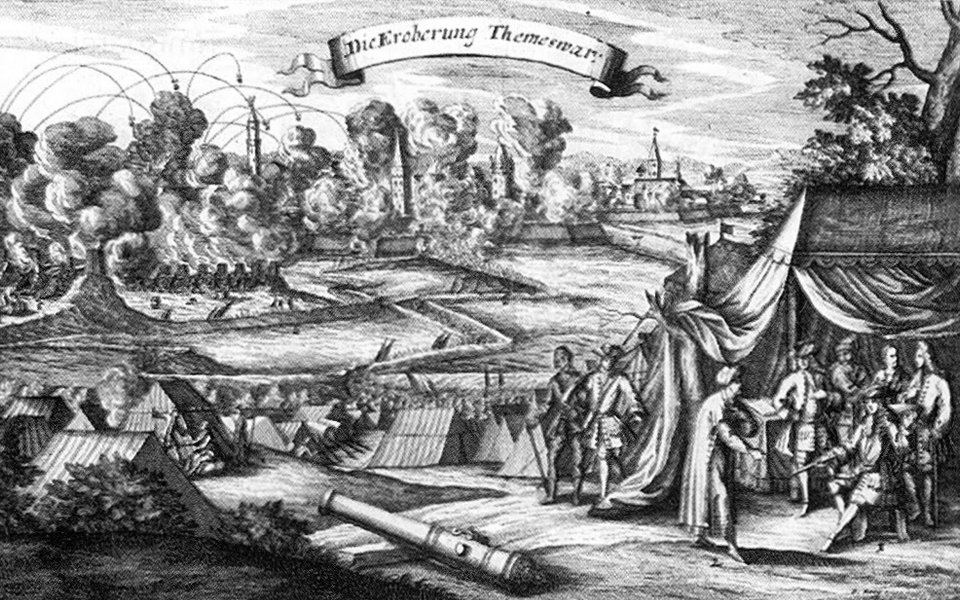
- Siege of Temeşvar, anonymous engraving
Date	31 August – 12 October 1716
Location	Temeşvar, Ottoman Empire 45.756°N 21.228°E
Result	Habsburg victory

Belligerents
Habsburg Monarchy	Ottoman Empire

Commanders and leaders
Eugene of Savoy; Alexander von Württemberg; Count von Mercy; Count János Pálffy; Franz Falkenstein †	Mustafa Pasha

Strength
45,000	16,000

Casualties and losses
2,407 killed 4,190 wounded	3,000 killed 3,000 wounded

Austro-Turkish War of 1716–18
Battle
2 = Karlowitz & Petrovaradin
Siege
3 = Temeșvar, 5 = Trebinje, 7 = Belgrade
Other
11 = Vučitrn

The siege of Temeşvar took place from 31 August to 12 October 1716 during the Austro-Turkish War of 1716-1718, to liberate the last regions of Ottoman-occupied Hungary. The Habsburg army led by Prince Eugene of Savoy, who had just won a crushing victory at Petrovaradin, managed to capture the Ottoman fortress of Temeşvar (today Timișoara, Romania), the capital of the Banat since 1552 and the last Turkish stronghold in Temeşvar Eyalet. The garrison capitulated after a 43-day siege. The city remained under military administration until 6 June 1778, when it was handed back to the administration of the Kingdom of Hungary.

== Background ==
Towards the end of the 17th century, the Ottoman Empire entered a period of stagnation. In 1686, the Habsburgs conquered Buda and in 1688 the fortresses located on the Mureș River including Szeged, Arad, and Lipova. Between late 1689 and early 1690, the Ottoman Empire conducted a long siege of the Timișoara Fortress which ended with the Habsburgs' retreat. In mid-1695, Sultan Mustafa II visited the Timișoara and Lipova fortresses, and ordered their reinforcement. In July 1696, the Habsburg army under the command of Augustus II the Strong besieged Timișoara, positioning artillery and other military engineering works around the fortress in early August. This siege failed and the Habsburgs were forced to retreat. Prince Eugene of Savoy's army crossed the Tisa River on 11 September 1697, defeating the Ottoman army at the Battle of Zenta.

On 5 August 1716, Eugene of Savoy won another victory over the Ottoman army at Petrovaradin. With enough resources for further action he headed towards Timișoara. The Habsburg army had about 45,000 men, more than 23,000 horses, 50 field guns and 87 siege cannons. The Ottoman garrison, led by Bodor Mustafa Pasha, consisted of approximately 16,000 men and 150 cannons.

== Siege ==
The fortifications were always in a state of repair and enhancement. Most were made of earth hardened by palisades of whitewashed tree trunks, which were ineffective against 18th-century cannons. The only masonry buildings were the castle, the mosques and the courtain surrounding the Angevin Fortress in the southern part of the city. All of the other buildings were made of wood, making them prone to destruction by fire. On 21 August 1716, General Joachim Ignaz von Rotenhan reached Timișoara with 14 cavalry squadrons. On 25 August, 16 cavalry regiments under the command of János Pálffy and 10 infantry battalions under the command of Charles Alexander, Duke of Württemberg arrived in Beregsău Mare. The other troops, including Eugene of Savoy's, arrived on 26 August. János Pálffy and his cavalry settled to the south of the fortress, with the purpose of blocking any Ottoman attempts to fetch reinforcements. Eugene of Savoy set up his General Staff, infantry, artillery and some cavalry to the northern part of the fortress, completely surrounding it. The besiegers had approximately 30,000 hand grenades and 760 tons of gunpowder. On 28 August, the besiegers captured the summer residence of the Turkish governor, Pasha's Well, which the Ottomans set on fire before they retreated.

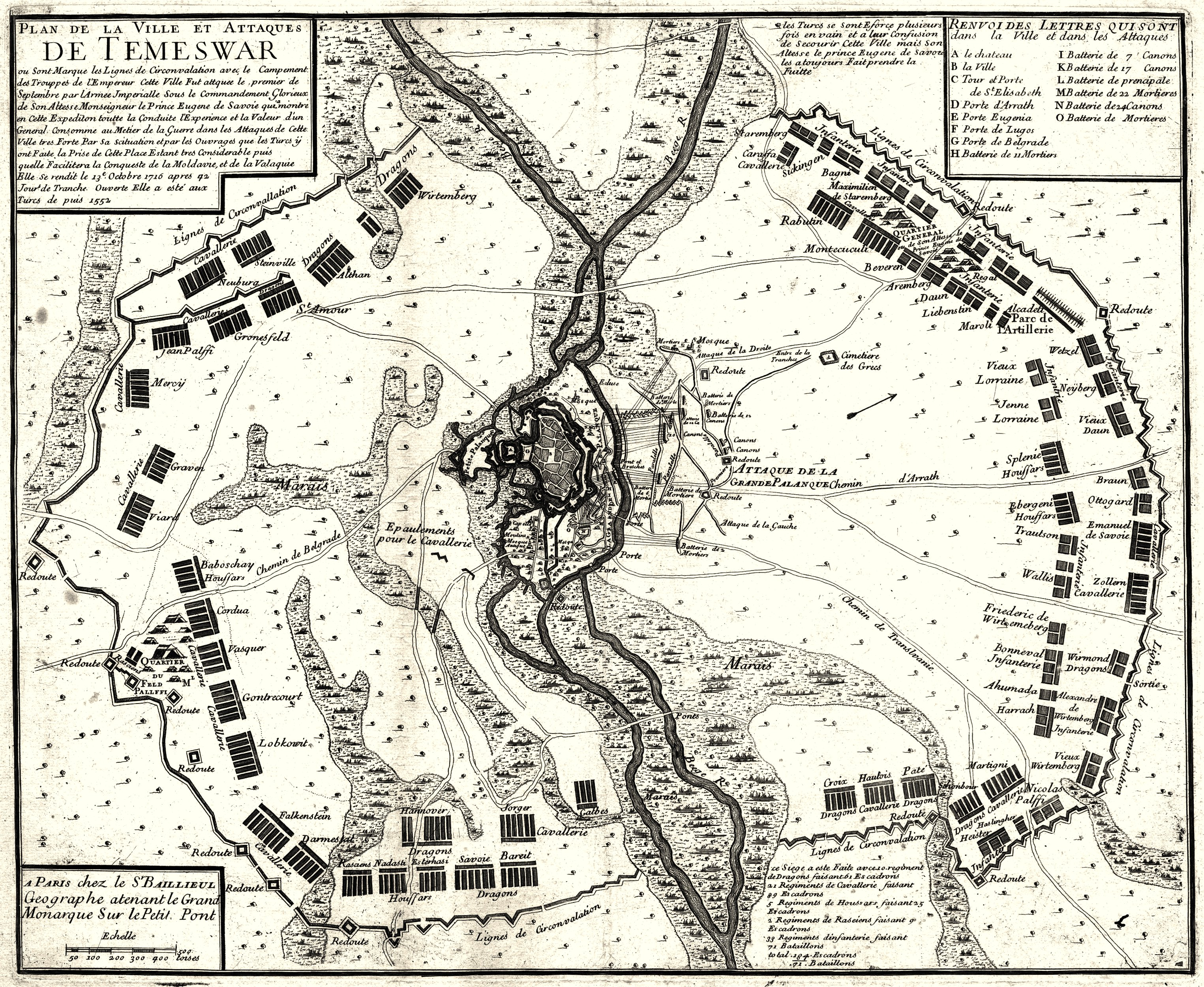
The plan of the Habsburg's siege of Temeşvar.

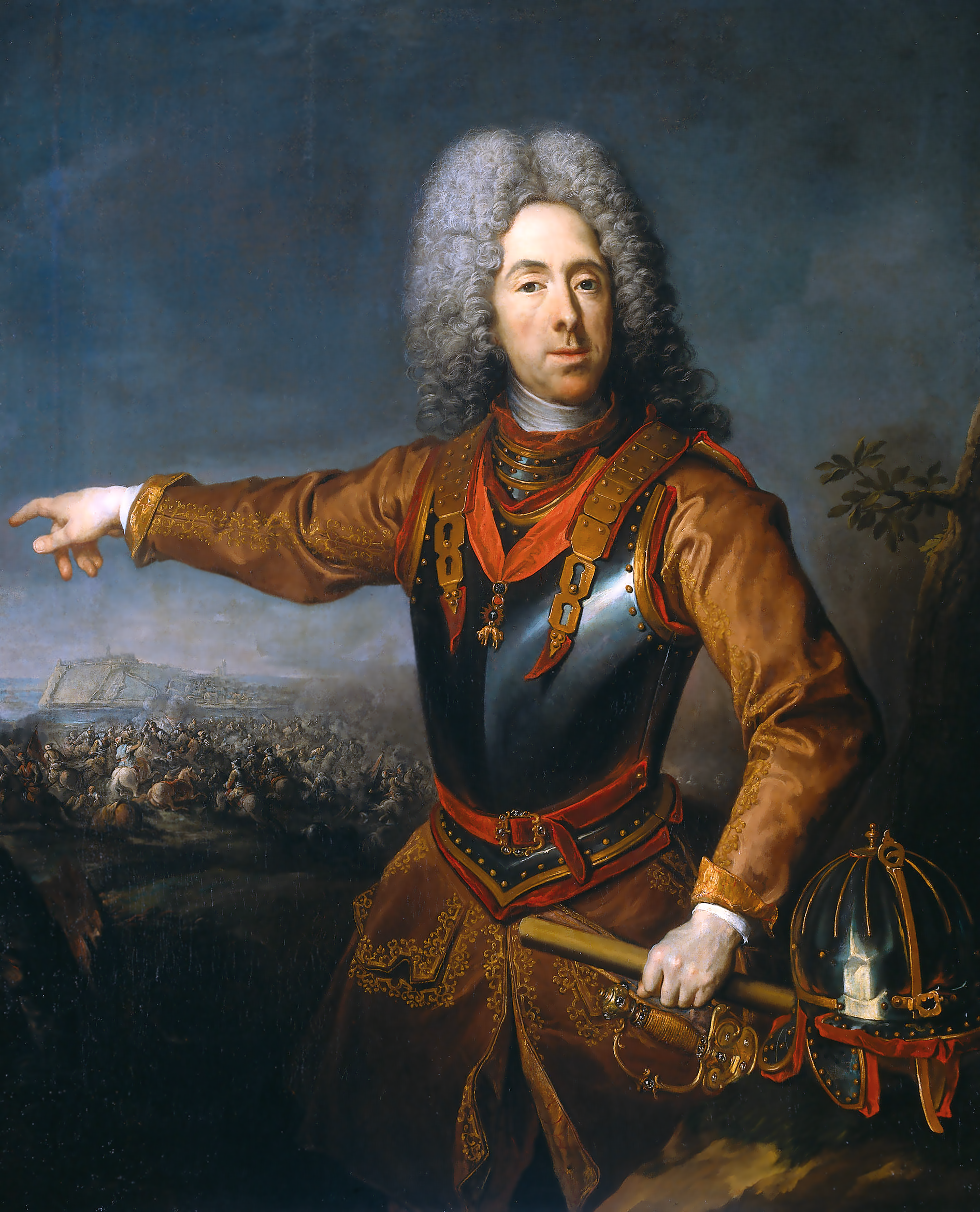
Portrait of Eugene of Savoy by Jacob van Schuppen (1718).

The siege began on 31 August. Between 1 and 15 September, the armies prepared for the battle. 3,000 people dug zigzag and parallel trenches alongside the Great Palanka (the southern outwork). On 5 September, the first two batteries with nine cannons were installed and on 6 September there was another battery with five cannons whose fire covered the military works. On 8 September, the trenches almost reached the palisade and began the filling of the moat with fascines. To prevent this, on the night of 9 September, the Ottomans attacked the trenches with torches to ignite the fascines but they were repulsed because the torches indicated the target's position. On 10 September, the Schönborn Dragoon Regiment fought off another Ottoman attack.

Beginning 16 September, the bombardment spread on the battlefield, growing in intensity as the cannons arrived and were installed. The first proposition to surrender was addressed on 17 September and was refused by the Ottomans. Between 20 and 22 September, the first breaches appeared in the walls and the wife and two sons of the beylerbey had been killed in their own house during the bombardment.

In the meantime, another army corps consisting of 14 cavalry squadrons, 4 infantry battalions, 3 companies of grenadiers and 2 regiments of cuirassiers fighting under the command of General Count Étienne de Stainville, the commander of the imperial troops, arrived at Timișoara from Weißenburg (Alba Iulia). At the time, Eugene of Savoy had 70 regiments under his command - 32 infantry (69 battalions), 10 dragoon (60 squadrons), 22 cavalry (134 squadrons) and 6 hussars (31 squadrons).

On 25 September the bombardment from both sides was very intense. The following day, the Ottoman troops from Belgrade arrived; they attempted to supply the fortress and attacked three times from the south to break through the encirclement. Simultaneously, the defenders of the fortress attacked but the rescuing troops attacked before the agreed time and, with no help from inside the fortress, were pushed back. The attack from the fortress had also been repulsed because of the lack of organization, so the rescuing party was forced to turn back.

On 30 September, the counterguard was conquered at the cost of 455 dead, 64 of which were officers, and 1,487 wounded including 160 officers. Between 1-10 October, new preparations were being made and cannons were being placed. On 11 October, a new, massive bombardment with the aim of destroying the fortifications began. The attack was carried out by 43 pieces of heavy artillery and continued throughout the night.

== Aftermath ==
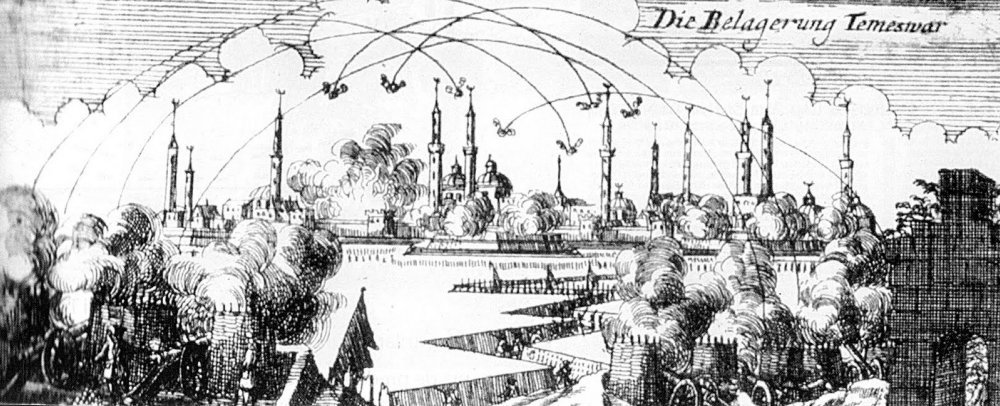
The capture of Temeswar. Monograph, c. 1720

On 12 October at 11:30, the white flag of surrender appeared on a bastion. The terms of surrender were:

- The Ottoman army could leave with their families and belongings;
- The Ottoman army could leave with their weapons and make their way to Belgrade in eight stages (Timiș River – Șag – Jebel – Deta – Margita – Alibunar – Pančevo – Borča – Zemun) under escort until reaching Borča if they left hostages in Timișoara until they crossed the Danube;
- The Ottoman army would be provided with 7,000 wagons for transportation – an unrealistic request as ultimately they were provided with what could be found, namely 1,000;
- The Ottoman army would be provided with food along the way at a decent, proper price (not profiteering);
- The Ottoman army convoy would be safe from attacks en route;
- The Ottoman army could not take the artillery and ammunition, which were considered spoils of war; all of the cannons – of which about 120 had the Habsburg emblem on them, won over during the years – as well as 280 tons of gunpowder and 170 tons of lead, were left behind;
- All of the other individuals would be allowed to leave or to stay – permitted for Romanians, Serbians, Armenians, Jews and Gipsies with the exception of the Habsburg deserters;
- The Kurucs were also allowed to leave or stay;
- Those individuals who chose to leave were allowed to sell whatever they wished;
- The guarantee of this understanding.

The Ottoman army left the fortress on 17 October; Mustafa Pasha, the commander of the fort, in gratitude for being allowed to withdraw his forces undisturbed, presented the prince with a horse. The following day, Eugene of Savoy entered the Timișoara Fortress. 466 Romanians and Orthodox Serbians, as well as 144 Jews and 35 Armenians, remained in Timișoara.

After Belgrade's conquest by the Austrians in 1718, the Austro-Turkish war ended and the Treaty of Passarowitz confirmed that Banat of Temeswar – including Timișoara Fortress – belonged to the Habsburg Monarchy. The city remained under military administration until 6 June 1778, when it was handed over to the Hungarian administration. The fortress, however, remained under the Austrian military command until 27 December 1860, when the Banat was incorporated into the Kingdom of Hungary.
