= Tahir Pasha =

Tahir Pasha may refer to:

- Tahir Pasha Mahmud Bey-zade (fl. 1711–18), Ottoman governor of Dukakin
- Tahir Pasha (Egypt) (died c. 1818), Ottoman governor of Egypt
- Tahir Pasha Bibezić (1848–1913), Ottoman brigadier general and bureaucrat of Albanian origin

== See also ==
- Taher (name)
