= Uprising in Vučitrn =

1717–1718 rebellion against Ottoman rule

- Part of Austro-Turkish War of 1716–18
| Date | fall 1717 – summer 1718 |
| Location | Sanjak of Viçitrina |
| Result | Ottoman victory |

Belligerents
| Serb population (rayah) | Ottoman Empire |

Commanders and leaders
| | Tahir Pasha; Ferhat Aga |

Austro-Turkish War of 1716–18
Battle
2 = Karlowitz & Petrovaradin
Siege
3 = Temeșvar, 5 = Trebinje, 7 = Belgrade
Other
11 = Vučitrn

During the Austro-Turkish War of 1716–18, after Austrian military success in the Banat, Serb peasants rose against Ottoman rule in the Sanjak of Viçitrina, and also at Novi Pazar and Peja in 1717. The rebellion was forcibly suppressed by Ottoman troops.

== Background ==
After the Austrians captured Belgrade in 1717, some of the Serbs in Eastern Kosovo also rose up No special reprisals were reported after the war in 1718 but taxes continued to grow, and eight years later an Ottoman report noted that the tax rises had been so steep that many of the richer raya from Eastern Kosovo were emigrating.

During the Austro-Turkish War of 1716–18, Austrian forces aided by Serb volunteers penetrated into West Morava and set up a new border there. The war resulted in renewed persecution against the Serb population in Kosovo, Metohija and neighbouring regions. The Ottomans relied on Albanians for securing their border regions with Austria, the Albanians becoming freed from the heaviest duties in return. The Albanians had for years opposed accepting subject obligations, but now promised to defend the land from enemies and to fight bandits among themselves; in return they were exempt from paying the mining tribute for that year.

In the second half of September 1717, during the retreat from Belgrade, at Niš the Ottoman sultan chose Vizier Abdul Pasha to maintain order and peace in Kosovo, and especially in Skopje, Pristina and Vushtrri.

== Uprising ==
In Vushtrri and the nearby areas of Novi Pazar and Peja, the Serb rayah rose up in a large revolt. This came after Austrian military success, and was meant to open the way for the Austrian army. Tahir Pasha was appointed by the government to deal with the rebellious Serbs. Ferhat Aga, the captain of Novi Pazar, joined Tahir Pasha to successfully suppress the uprising at Vushtrri, Novi Pazar and Peja. The Ottoman troops that were sent to pacify the people and investigate, carried out new violence.

== Aftermath ==
After the rebellion, the Albanians put pressure on Serbs and local Ottoman leaders. Tahir Pasha was meant to keep the rebellious rayah on the land, but also to impose tribute on the "new yabancı (foreigner) rayah" (the immigrant Albanians) who seized other's property that did not belong to them. Trying to address the Albanian problem, in September 1718 Tahir Pasha sought a firman (official decree) to eradicate bandits to calm the land "from their plunder and murder". Only a month after the decree, Kurd Mehmed Pasha from Yakova was given the Sanjak of İpek, and Tahir Pasha is no longer mentioned as alive.

The harsh economic status, robberies, and threat of murder pushed the Kosovo Serbs into either accepting Islam, or seeking protection under a strong lord (accepting serfdom status). Many opted for a third alternative, to take refuge in other areas where life was more acceptable.

== See also ==
- Kingdom of Serbia (1718–39)
