= Siege of Trebinje =

1716 battle of the Austro-Turkish War

- Part of the Austro-Turkish War (1716–1718)
Date	26 November 1716
Location	Trebinje, Ottoman Empire 42°42′34″N 18°20′55″E
Result	Ottoman victory

Belligerents
Habsburg Monarchy; Republic of Venice; Hajduks	Ottoman Empire

Commanders and leaders
Nastić	Unknown

Strength
7,000 men	1,000 men

Casualties and losses
Unknown	Unknown

Austro-Turkish War of 1716–18
Battle
2 = Karlowitz & Petrovaradin
Siege
3 = Temeșvar, 5 = Trebinje, 7 = Belgrade
Other
11 = Vučitrn

The siege of Trebinje was an Austro-Venetian attempt to take the city of Trebinje from the Ottoman forces.

== Battle ==
Austrian general Nastić tried to take Trebinje with 400 soldiers and c. 500 hajduks, but was repelled. A combined 7,000 strong Austro-Venetian-Hajduk army stood before the Trebinje walls, defended by only 1,000 Ottomans. The Ottomans were busy near Belgrade and with hajduk attacks towards Mostar, they were unable to reinforce Trebinje. The conquest of Trebinje and Popovo field were given up to fight in Montenegro. The Venetians took over Hutovo and Popovo, where they immediately recruited militarily from the population.

== Sources ==
- Mihić, Ljubo (1975). Ljubinje sa okolinom. Dragan Srnić. p. 196.
