= Siege of Zvornik =

Siege of Zvornik (1717)
- Part of the Austro-Turkish War (1716–1718)
Date	15 September – 3 October 1717
Location	Zvornik
Result	Ottoman victory

Belligerents
Habsburg monarchy	Ottoman Empire

Commanders and leaders
Maximilian von Petrasch (WIA); Baron von Beckers	Dervish Bey Fidahić; Mehmed Agha Atić; Kethuda Ibrahim Agha

Strength
3,000 men	3,000–5,000 men

Casualties and losses
1,300 killed: 1,000 killed; 300 prisoners executed	Unknown

The siege of Zvornik was a military engagement during the Austro-Turkish War (1716–1718). The Austrians besieged Zvornik held by the Ottomans. The siege ended in fiasco for the Austrians, who suffered heavy losses.

== Background ==
After the victory of capturing Belgrade, the Austrian forces believed it was time to intensify their attacks on Bosnia and, if possible, capture as many places as possible. The Austrian general Maximilian von Petrasch was planning for an upcoming invasion of Bosnia in late August and early September. His main goal was the city of Zvornik. Petrasch believed that by capturing Zvornik, he would establish a foothold in Bosnia. Petrasch was also told that Zvornik was in a bad state. Zvornik was located on the Drina River, where the mountains with steep slopes almost reach the river. The fort was also on the left bank of the river. Petrasch assembled around 3,000 men at Rača. The garrison of Zvornik had a strong force of 3,000–5,000 men and were led by Dervish Bey Fidahić and Mehmed Agha Atić.

== Siege ==
On September 12th, 1717, the army was able to leave Rača, and on the 15th they arrived near Zvornik. The next day, the attack began, and the Austrians routed a force of 100 janissaries from the first guardhouse, but while pursuing them, they immediately had to withstand a furious sortie from the garrison. The Austrians managed to capture the second Ottoman line within the suburbs. The Ottomans retreated into the water city fortified with stone walls and block houses and into the castle. Outside the town, scattered in the rocky terrain, were individual groups of their reinforcements that had come.

The Austrians, led by Baron von Beckers, launched the attack on the water city. The walls were scaled, the gate opened from the inside, and the Ottomans were driven away from here as well and forced to retreat into the castle and even further behind it. This was the actual fortress, enclosed by a strong wall and round towers. During the course of the attack, Petrasch fell, severely wounded at the foot. Several officers were wounded as well. This demoralized the troops, during which they suffered 100 casualties. The Ottomans had succeeded in setting the houses in the water city on fire; the Imperial forces were forced to retreat from them on the night of September 19.

The Austrians were not able to continue the attack, having used all of their ammunition, and two mortars were exploded. The Austrians did not have enough men to continue the attack. Meanwhile, the Ottoman Grand Vizier, Köprülüzade Numan Pasha, had been preparing a relief army led by Kethuda Ibrahim Agha. Seeing this situation, Beckers asked Prince Eugene of Savoy for reinforcements. After the Austrian failure at Novi Grad, Ottoman morale was high, and an upcoming Ottoman relief force made Beckers believe that a longer stay was no longer possible.

The Austrians, on September 30, began their retreat. With the onset of night, the remote posts were withdrawn, and at midnight the march began, initially proceeding successfully. But already on October 1, the pursuing Ottomans caught up with the rear guard, who were busy moving the train stuck in a defile. The Ottomans attacked the rearguard fiercely, scattering them. A large amount of baggage fell into the hands of the Ottomans. The Austrians arrived at Rača on October 3rd under unbearable difficulties. They suffered 1,000 deaths, and 300 were captured, whom would be executed.

== Aftermath ==
The Austrian defeats at Zvornik and Novi delayed their attack on Bihać. As a result, they consolidated their gains on the northern Bosnian border. The victory was due to Bosnian eyalet preparations over the past 15 years.

== Sources ==
- Charles Ingrao, Jovan Pešalj (2011), The Peace of Passarowitz, 1718.
- Moriz von Angeli (1891), Campaigns of Prince Eugene of Savoy (In German).
- Abel Lukšić (1878), Bosnia and Herzegovina (In German).
