= Trenčianska Turná =

Village in Slovakia

- Municipality
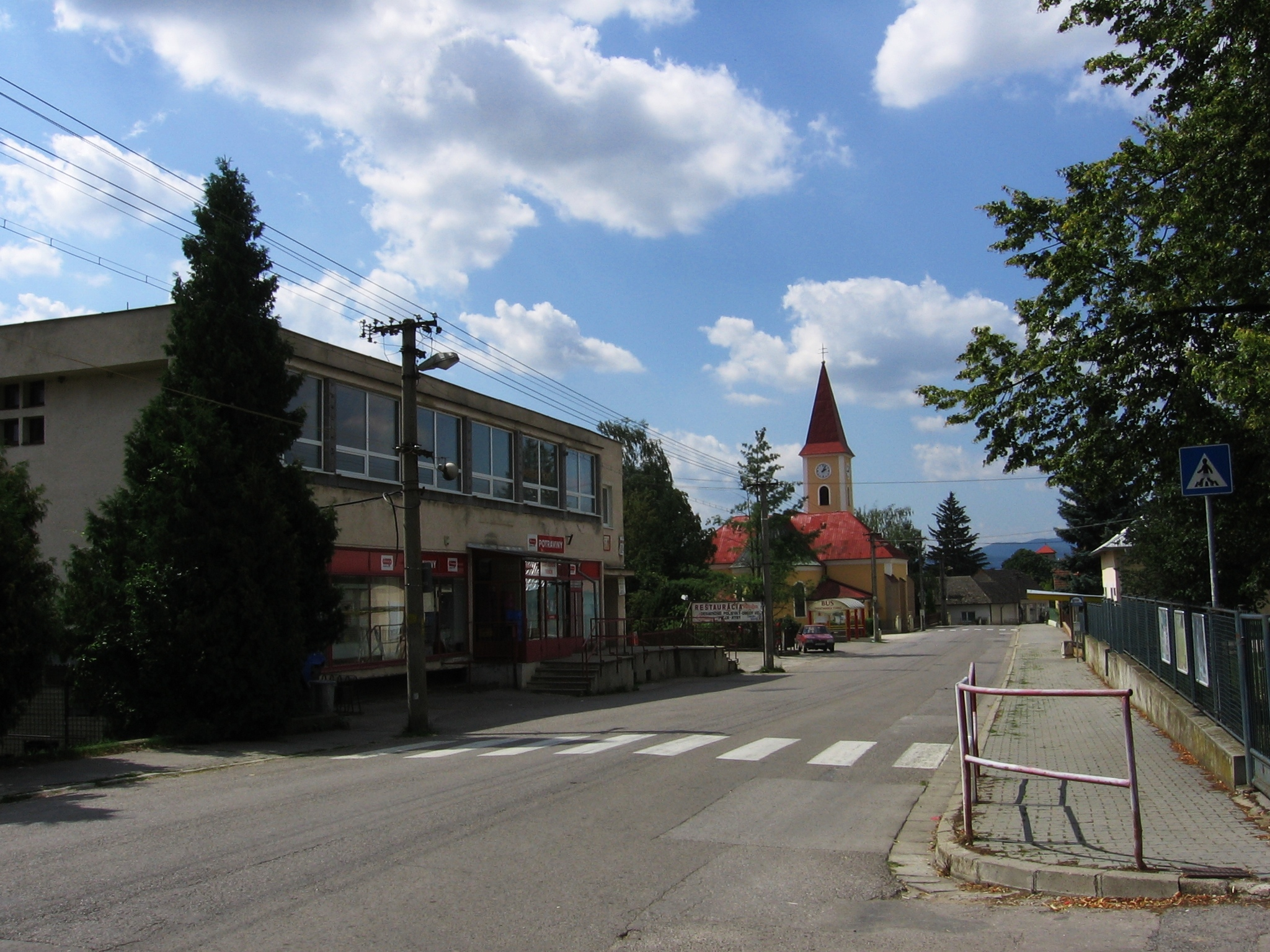

- Flag

- Location of Trenčianska Turná in the Trenčín Region Location of Trenčianska Turná in Slovakia
- Coordinates: 48.85°N 18.02°E
- Country: Slovakia
- Region: Trenčín Region
- District: Trenčín District
- First mentioned: 1269

Government
  - Mayor: Peter Mikula

Area
  - Total: 17.46 km^{2} (6.74 sq mi)
- Elevation: 227 m (745 ft)

Population (2025)
  - Total: 3,519
- Time zone: UTC+1 (CET)
  - Summer (DST): UTC+2 (CEST)
- Postal code: 913 21
- Area code: +421 32
- Vehicle registration plate (until 2022): TN
- Website: www.trencianskaturna.sk

Trenčianska Turná (Hungarian: Tornyos) is a village and municipality in Trenčín District in the Trenčín Region of north-western Slovakia. It has a population of about 3043 people (2008).

== History ==
In historical records the village was first mentioned in 1269. The area of village on 3 August 1708 the battle between the Habsburg army of General Heister and Kuruc Army of Francis II Rákóczi took place.

Trenčianska Turná merged with a neighboring village Hámre in 1976.

== Geography ==
The municipality lies at an altitude of 227 metres (745 ft) and covers an area of 17.46 km^{2} (6.74 sq mi) (2025). Trenčianska Turná lies to the North of the Považský Inovec Mts. in the southern portion of the Trenčín Basin. Located near road I/50 connecting the towns Trenčín and Bánovce nad Bebravou. Creek Turniansky potok flows through the village. The northern slopes of the Považský Inovec Mts. are rich on mineral springs. Presence of the springs is considered as a result of circulation of groundwater near the Inovec fault.

== Population ==
Population statistic (10 years)
Year	1995	2005	2015	2025
Count	2513	2874	3232	3519
Difference		+14.36%	+12.45%	+8.87%

Population statistic
Year	2024	2025
Count	3561	3519
Difference		−1.17%

It has a population of 3519 people (31 December 2025).

=== Ethnicity ===
Census 2021 (1+ %)
Ethnicity	Number	Fraction
Slovak	3490	97.95%
Not found out	60	1.68%
Total	3563	

In year 2021 was 3563 people by ethnicity 3490 as Slovak, 60 as Not found out, 33 as Czech, 7 as Hungarian, 5 as Other, 5 as Greek, 4 as Russian, 3 as Rusyn, 2 as German, 1 as Jewish, 1 as Moravian, 1 as Korean and 1 as Albanian.

Note on population: The difference values of population numbers in the table "Population statistic" and in the sections "Ethnicity" & "Religion" is caused by the use of various statistical methods.

=== Religion ===
Census 2021 (1+ %)
Religion	Number	Fraction
Roman Catholic Church	2507	70.36%
None	715	20.07%
Evangelical Church	194	5.44%
Not found out	63	1.77%
Total	3563	

In year 2021 was 3563 people by religion 2507 from Roman Catholic Church, 715 from None, 194 from Evangelical Church, 63 from Not found out, 34 from Greek Catholic Church, 13 from Ad hoc movements, 11 from Other, 5 from Paganism and natural spirituality, 5 from Buddhism, 4 from Calvinist Church, 3 from Jehovah's Witnesses, 3 from Islam, 2 from Christian Congregations in Slovakia, 1 from Jewish community, 1 from Eastern Orthodox Church, 1 from Other and not ascertained christian church and 1 from Seventh-day Adventist Church.
