= History of Timișoara =

This article is about the History of Timișoara, the largest and most important city in the Romanian Banat. Timișoara is also known by the following names: Hungarian: Temesvár, German: Temeswar / Temeschwar / Temeschburg, Serbo-Croatian: Temišvar / Темишвар, Turkish: Tamışvar / Temeşvar.

== Antiquity ==
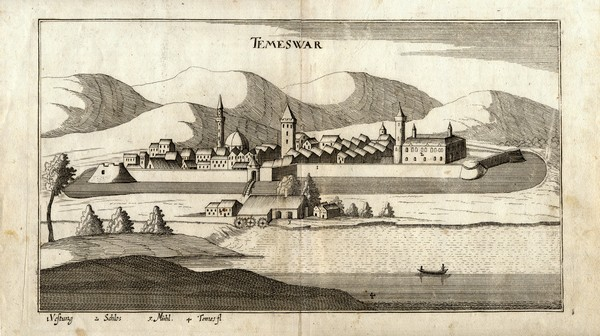
Timișoara in a 1685 engraving by Wagner

Archaeological discoveries prove that the area where Timișoara is located today has been inhabited since ancient times. The first identifiable civilization in this area were the Agathyrsi, who could be the namers of the Mureș river. The Getae, who were relatives to the Dacians conquered the territory in 335 BC. From coin finds, it is known that the settlement was inhabited during the Roman settlement of Dacia. While no record of the settlement is known from those times, it is generally agreed that the site was inhabited through the Middle Ages when the city was mentioned for the first time.

== Middle Ages ==
Archaeological finds from a medieval cemetery show that a community of warriors settled in the region west of the present-day town in the second half of the 10th century. Almost half of the 41 graves yielded grave goods (including arrow heads, hair rings, earrings and bracelets), suggesting that those who were buried in the cemetery persisted with their pagan rites. The placing of arrow heads into graves is well documented among 10th-century Hungarian warriors in the Carpathian Basin. The position of the arm bones in ten graves may indicate that Christians or people influenced by Christianity were also buried in the cemetery. Various types of rings point at commercial contacts between the local inhabitants and the Balkan Peninsula. The cemetery was abandoned in the first decades of the 11th century.

The mid-12th-century Muslim geographer, Muhammad al-Idrisi, mentioned a town named "T.n.y.s.b.r" and described it as a prosperous settlement, located to the south of the river "T.y.s.y.a", or Tisza. Historian István Petrovics associates T.n.y.s.b.r with Temesvár, suggesting that Idrisi mislocated it because he had no direct information of the town. Timișoara was named after a fortress: the Hungarian name of the town, Temesvár, refers to a castle (vár) on the river Timiș (Temes). The fortress was first mentioned in the Register of Arad around 1177. The document mentioned two villages, "Sep" and "Vrman", on the royal estates attached to the fortress "Demesiensis". It was most probably made of earth and timber, according to historian Ferenc Sebők. The fortress, which was erected on a swampy land, near a tributary of the Temes, the Bega, was the seat of the ispán, or head of Temes County. In 1241 the city was destroyed during the Mongol invasion of Hungary and Poland, but the walls were rebuilt.

Charles I of Hungary took up his residence in Temesvár in 1315, because a dozen powerful lords who had refused to yield to him controlled large territories in other parts of Hungary. In the next years, a royal castle was erected near the old fortress and the latter was rebuilt with stone. According to Petrovics, the church dedicated to Saint Eligius implies that Italian artisans settled in the town during this period, because the saint was primarily venerated in Naples. The Dominicans settled in the town before Csanád Telegdi was consecrated bishop in their local church in early 1323. After Charles I restored royal authority, he transferred his court from Temesvár to the centrally located Visegrád in the summer of 1323.

The "guest settlers" in the town (hospites de Themeswar) were first mentioned in 1341, the burghers of Timișoara (cives de Temeswar) in 1342. The ethnicity of the citizens was rarely mentioned, but their names suggest that most "guest settlers" and burghers were Hungarians. Records of citizens who moved from Șemlacu Mare, Maráz and other nearby villages to Temesvár prove that it had developed into an important regional center. Merchants from Ragusa (now Dubrovnik in Croatia) settled in the town around 1402. Bulgarians, Romanians and Serbians also moved to the town in the 15th and 16th centuries. For instance, the name of Johannes Olaah ("John the Vlach"), who was a burgher of Temesvár in 1539, suggests that he was of Romanian origin.

By the middle of the 14th century, Temesvár was at the forefront of Western Christendom's battle against the Muslim Ottoman Turks. French and Hungarian crusaders met at the city before engaging in the Battle of Nicopolis in 1396. Beginning in 1443, John Hunyadi used Temesvár as a military stronghold against the Turks, having built a powerful fortress. The city was repeatedly sieged by the Ottomans in 1462, 1476, 1491, and 1522.

In 1514, the largest peasants' revolt in Hungarian history was defeated in a battle near Temesvár and its Székely leader György Dózsa was tortured and executed.

== Ottoman Rule ==
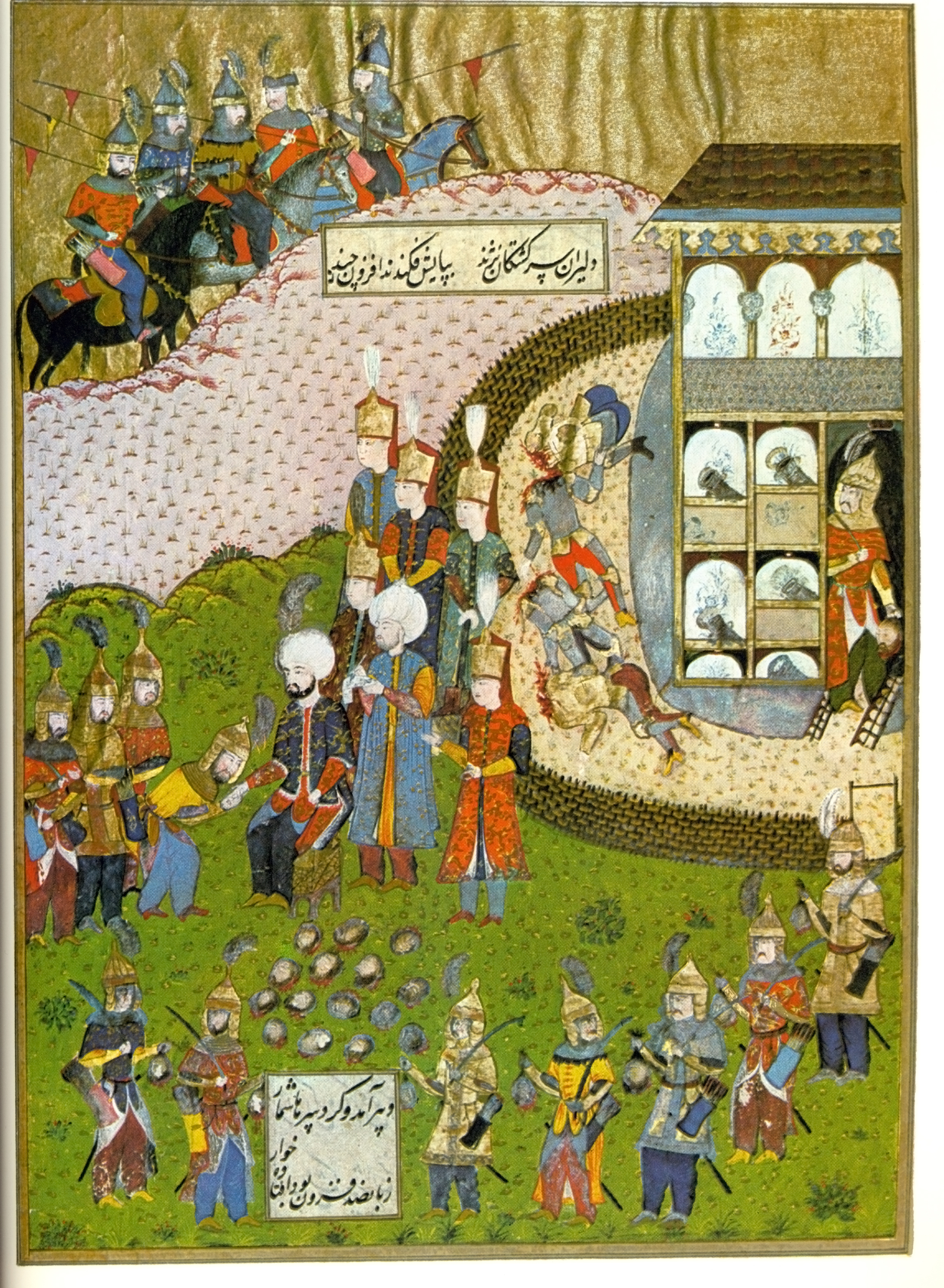
After the capture of Timișoara, 1552

Because of Temesvár's strategic location, the Ottomans desired to capture the fortress during their campaigns against the Kingdom of Hungary. Although the Hungarians suffered a devastating loss at the Battle of Mohács in 1526, Temesvár was not conquered by the Ottomans until October 1551.

The city was transformed into the administrative centre of an Ottoman province, the Province of Temeşvar. The fortress was rebuilt and, along with Belgrade, used as a major military base by the Ottomans. Because of its military orientation, the city itself developed slowly during the Ottoman administration. Timișoara had two fortified parts: the castle and the city, which was surrounded by wooden and stone walls. 200 guns were used to defend the city, as well as water trenches around the walls. Approximately 1,200 houses, schools, hotels, and public baths were to be found inside the walls, while outside the walls, around 1,500 other houses were present.

== The Habsburg Era ==
The Ottomans surrendered the city to the Habsburg Imperial armies, led by Prince Eugene of Savoy, on 12 October 1716, during the Austro-Turkish War of 1716–18. Prince Eugene entered the city on October 18 and named one of his officers, Claudius Florimund Mercy, as governor of the city. Because the town had burned down during the siege, the city was completely rebuilt under Mercy's supervision. Temesvár was officially conceded to the Austrian Habsburg monarchy by the Ottomans in the Treaty of Passarowitz of 1718. Temesvár became the capital of the Banat of Temeswar, a separate Habsburg province. The province was abolished in 1778 and reincorporated into the Kingdom of Hungary.

Under Habsburg rule, a new stone fortress was built around the city in 1723. Inside the walls houses, hospitals, schools, and churches were being raised, while outside the city factories were being opened. By the 1720 data, most of the inhabitants of the town were ethnic Serbs, and also some Romanians. Later, German, Italian, and Spanish settlers were brought in to settle in the area. The marshland around the city was reclaimed, while the rivers Bega and Temes became regulated. The city remained a military stronghold with a large garrison. This period was one of strong economic development and population increases. By 1781, Temesvár was one of the most important cities of the Habsburg monarchy, and as such, it received a royal free city warrant, which would accelerate the development of the city even further. Because of the Habsburg administration, Temesvár was often referred to by the German names Temeschburg, meaning "castle (Burg) on the Temes" or Temeschwar, based on the Hungarian Temesvár. Temesvár was captured in 1788 and looted by Ottomans in 1789 during the Austro-Turkish War (1788–1791).

== The 1848/1849 Revolution ==
During the Revolutions of 1848, revolutionaries took over the Hungarian government. Because the Austrian commander of the city's garrison decided to defend the Habsburg interests, the Hungarian army began an unsuccessful siege of Temesvár that lasted for 114 days. In the later stages of the revolution, the city was captured by the Serbian troops and, for a short time, was a capital of the Serbian Vojvodina.

== Modernization of Temesvár ==
Timișoara in 1910

The development of the city continued after the attempted 1848/1849 revolution. In 1849, Temesvár became the capital of the new Habsburg province, named Voivodeship of Serbia and Temes Banat. The province was abolished in 1860. The city became capital of Temes County after the Austro-Hungarian Compromise of 1867, which united the administrations of the region with those of the Kingdom of Hungary.

In 1853, telegraphy was introduced in the city, and in 1857 Temesvár received gas street lighting. In 1857, a train line linking Temesvár with Szeged was constructed, and in 1867, horse trams were introduced in the city. The Hungarian city of Temesvár became the first European city to have electric street lights in 1884, while the trams became electric in 1899 (after Bucharest, in 1884). Temesvár was also the first city in the Kingdom of Hungary, and later Romania, to have an ambulance station.

After World War I, following an ephemerous pro-Hungary Banat Republic, and occupation by the Serbian Army, Timișoara was incorporated into the Kingdom of Romania in 1919, together with most of the Banat region.

== The Romanian Revolution of 1989 ==
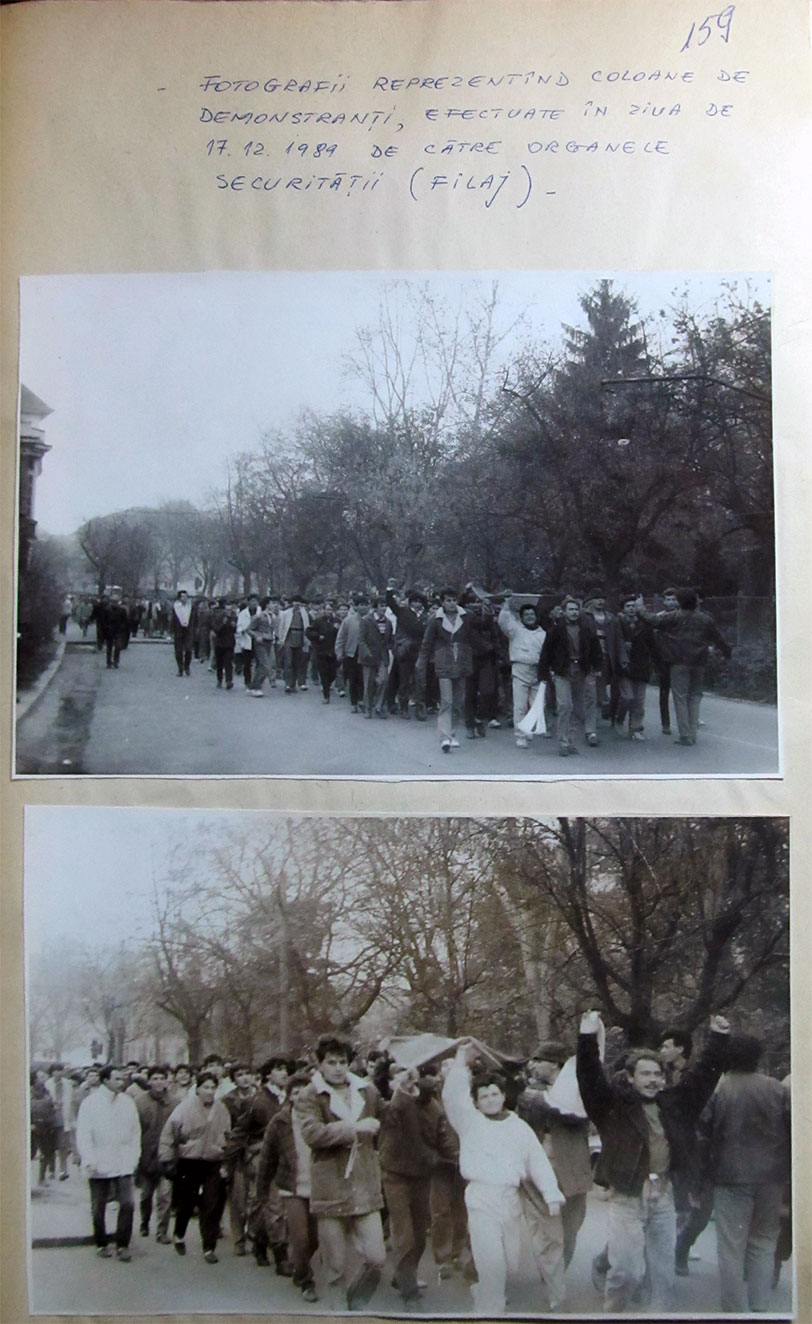
Protesters in Timișoara during the first days of the Romanian Revolution, 17 December 1989

In December 1989 a popular uprising began in Timișoara against the Communist regime of Nicolae Ceauşescu. The Hungarian Calvinist pastor László Tőkés was ordered to be deported by the Securitate, or secret police, and as a reaction his house was surrounded by members of his church. People supporting him, including people of Romanian origin, gathered at the central square (Opera Square). The Communist administration ordered the army to fire at the congregation. However, a number of army officers refused to open fire and sided with the people. That was the beginning of the Romanian Revolution of 1989, which ended the Communist regime a week later. Timișoara was declared the first Free Town on 20 December 1989, suffering 130 reported deaths and 3,352 wounded during the revolution.

== Timetable of the history of Timișoara ==
- 1019 – Timișoara (as Dibiscos/Bisiskos/Tibiskos/Tibiskon/Timbisko, etc.) is mentioned for the first time in written documents by Byzantine Emperor Basil II (not all historians agree with this identification).
- 1154 – The Arab geographer Sarif al Idrisi, in his work "The book of pleasures", is describing precisely the road from Cavorz (i.e. Karlowitz/Sremski Karlovci) to Timișoara, passing through Cnez (i.e. Satchinez/Knez); he declares that Timișoara is "a pleasant city ... offering great richness".
- 1177 – First mention of the Castrensis de Thymes in a medieval document.
- 1212 – The fort of Timișoara (Castrum Temesiensis) is mentioned in the decree of King Andrew II of Hungary.
- 1241 – The town is partly destroyed by the Tatars.
- 1307 – Charles I of Hungary builds the stone fortress and makes the city the capital of his kingdom.
- 1323 – King Charles I of Hungary attends the holy service in Saint George's Church [Sfântu Gheorghe]. This last church with this patronym was demolished before World War I.
- 1342 – Timișoara was mentioned for the first time with the title of "civitas" (city).
- 1370 – The first handicraftsmen's guild is documented in Timișoara.
- 1396 – The town is preparing as the gathering camp for the Nicopolis Crusade (never started).
- 1441 – John Hunyadi appointed Voivode of Transylvania, Counts of the Székelys, Ispán of Temes County and Captain of Nándorfehérvár (now Belgrade), he assumed responsibility for the defense of the frontiers against the Ottomans.
- 1478–1494 – Pál Kinizsi becomes county head of Temes County and Captain of Fortress of Temesvár.
- 1497 – Pelbart of Timișoara, the only author of incunabula in Romania, publishes his works in Basel and later in Hagenau.
- 1514 – Timișoara Fortress is attacked by rebel peasant troops led by George Dozsa (Dózsa György in Hungarian, Gheorghe Doja in Romanian). The revolt was put down and George Dózsa executed in a cruel and unmerciful way (along with other 40,000–60,000 rebel peasants) in Timișoara. Today, on the place of the martyrdom, of the hot throne, there is the statue of Saint Mary signed by sculptor György Kiss. According to the legend, during George Dózsa's surplice, the Jesuit monks saw in the ear the image of Holy Virgin. The first statue was raised here in 1865. The actual monument was raised in 1906.
- 1549 – Opening of the Protestant School in Timișoara founded and led by István Kiss of Szeged.
- 1552 – Timișoara is conquered by the Ottoman Empire and becomes capital of the Eyalet of Temeşvar.
- 1596 – Sigismund Báthory of Transylvania and Michael the Brave of Wallachia fail to capture Timișoara after a 40-day siege.
- 1660 – The Ottoman historian, geographer and globetrotter Evliya Çelebi (B. 1611, D. March 1682) visits Timișoara. According to him (in Seyahatname/The book of travels), the locality had more than 36,000 inhabitants (living in 10 suburbs—1500 houses—around the fortress) and the fortress's garrison numbered 10,000 soldiers. In the fortress existed 1200 houses, more than 400 shops, 4 public baths, 3 restaurants and confectioneries, 7 schools.
- 1688 – The East Banat is conquered by the Habsburg Monarchy's general Veterani (born in Venice).
- 1688 – The Turkish garrison of Timișoara rises against the Ottoman authorities.
- 1696 – The imperial troops, led by Frederick Augustus I, besiege Timișoara unsuccessfully.
- 1716 – Prince Eugene of Savoy takes the town from the Turks. The population consisted of 235,000 Romanians and about 100,000 Serbian and mixed families.
- 1722–1726 – First wave of German colonists (Danube Swabians) under Emperor Charles VI.
- 1728/1771/1783 – Digging and regularization of the Bega channel. The Bega was transformed into a navigable channel (115 km), which connected the Banat with other European riverways. The first attempt to regulate the Bega and Timiș rivers were made under the Ottoman occupation by A. Cornaro, when some work was done in the Budinț-Chizătău zone. The first steps were made between 1728–1732, under Count Florimund Mercy's leadership.
- 1728 – A tobacco mill is set up in Timișoara. The factory, modernised in the 20th c. was still functioning in the middle '90s.
- 1753 – The first mention of an organized theatre of Timișoara. A German group of actors performed theatre plays in the town between May–November. Timișoara is the third town in the Empire, after Vienna and Budapest with a permanent theatre season.
- 1760 – Timișoara is the first town in the Empire where the public lighting using suet candles and lamps with oil and grease is introduced.
- 1763–1772 – Second wave of German colonization under Empress Maria Theresa of Austria.
- 1782–1786 – Third wave of German colonists under Emperor Joseph II.
- 1738–1739 – Epidemic of plague.
- 1762–1763 – Epidemic of plague.
- 1771 – The first printing house/owner Mathäus Heimerl, in Fabric quarter.
- 1781 – 21 December: Joseph II's decree regarding the privilege of imperial Free city Timișoara.
- 1788 – Ottomans captured Temeșvar during Austro-Turkish War (1787–1791).
- 1789 – Ottomans looted it during retreat.
- 1796 – The Magic Flute was performed in Timișoara five years after its premiere in Vienna.
- 1815 – Printer Joseph Klapka – the future mayor – sets up in Timișoara the first borrowing library in a Hungarian town.
- 1819 – Joseph Klapka becomes mayor of Timișoara.
- 1823 – November 3: In his letter addressed from Timișoara to his father in Târgu-Mureş, mathematician János Bolyai mentions that he discovered the principles of the Non-Euclidean geometry.
- 1846 – Composer and pianist Franz Liszt halted in Timișoara and performed three concerts in the Theater's hall.
- 1847 – Johann Strauss II, the "Waltz King", performs in Timișoara with his orchestra.

Timișoara has 22,560 inhabitants.

- 1849 – Between April 26 and August 8, Timișoara is sieged by Hungarian revolutionary forces (the longest siege of the town).
- 1852 – Timișoara is linked with Vienna through the telegraph line. This is the first line in the territory of present-day Romania.
- 1855 – February 9: Giuseppe Verdi's "La Traviata" opening night in Timișoara.
- 1857 – Public street lighting with aerial gas.
- 1857 – Inauguration of the first railroad in the Banat's plain: Szeged–Kikinda–Jimbolia–Timișoara, 112 kilometres (70 miles). To travel from Timișoara to Budapest took 26 hours and from Timișoara to Vienna 36h. The first railroad station is opened in Timișoara.
- 1866 – Alexandru Ioan Cuza, Prince of Moldavia and Wallachia stops in Timișoara on his way into exile. He stays at the "Trompetistul" Inn.
- 1869 – First tram with horses (6.6 km).
- 1870 – The first metallic bridge, the Bem bridge, is built on Bega Channel. Today 13 bridges exist in Timișoara.
- 1879 – Start of the works on the town's telephone network (first 52 subscribers) in Timișoara. The network was built as a private enterprise by Ignatiu Leyritz.
- 1879 – September 15: Recital of Johannes Brahms and Joseph Joachim in Timișoara.
- 1883 – June 5: The Orient Express Train is launched, passing through Banat: Szeged–Kikinda–Jimbolia–Timișoara–Caransebeş–Orşova.
- 1886 – Set up of the "Ambulance" service of Timișoara. This is the first ambulance station in Hungary and today Romania.
- 1891 – The first permanent museum is opened in Timișoara.
- 1899 – June 25: The first football/soccer match in today Romania was held in Timișoara between the schoolboys of the Piarist High-School led by Carol Müller, gymnastic professor.
- 1907 – The walls of the fortress are destroyed to allow for new construction.
- 1918 – November 15: Serbian forces occupied the town. The Banat region was desired by both Serbia and Romania.
- 1918 – December 3: French colonial forces arrived to avoid any possible conflicts between Serbia and Romania.
- 1919 – July 28: The Romanian administration is installed. After the Trianon Treaty of 1920 Banat is partitioned between Romania (2/3) and Serbia (1/3).
- 1919 – August 3: Romanian Army enters Timișoara. Installation of the Romanian administration of the region
- 1920 – The theater is destroyed by a fire. It will be rebuilt and opened only in 1928 (arch. Duiliu Marcu)
- 1920 – Set up and opening of the Polytechnic School of Timișoara.
- 1921 – George Enescu's first concerts in Timișoara.
- 1921–1927 – The soccer team "Chinezul" from Timișoara is the champion of Romania in 6 consecutive editions of the championship.
- 1926 – The statue of "Lupoaica" ("She-wolf" - Romulus and Remus), a gift from Italian authorities and later the town symbol, is inaugurated in the center.
- 1928 – The first professional soccer club from Romania – "Ripensia" - is founded in Timișoara.
- 1930 – Timișoara has 91,866 inhabitants (census), was the seventh biggest city in Romania (26% Romanians, 30% Hungarians, 30% Germans, 8% Jewish).
- 1932–1938 – The soccer team "Ripensia" from Timișoara is, for the 5th time, the champion of Romania.
- 1944 – June 16–17th: The city is bombed for the first time, by Britain's RAF.
- 1944 – July 3: The city is bombed again, by the United States Air Force.
- 1944 – September 12: The Soviet Red Army enters.
- 1945 – The first professional Romanian theatre group is established in Timișoara.
- 1946 – The Romanian Opera is established, and its first performance, in April 1947, is "Aida" by Giuseppe Verdi.
- 1953 – The State Magyar Theater (Teatrul Maghiar de Stat) is established (known since 1990 as Csiky Gergely theatre), as well as the State German Theater (Teatrul German de Stat)
- 1955 – The first radio show broadcast by Radio Timișoara.
- 1961 – Mecipt 1, the first Romanian alphanumeric computer was made in Timișoara.
- 1986 – The Botanic Park is opened in Timișoara. The Zoo is opened in the same year.
- 1989 – 16 December: The Revolution against the communist regime of Nicolae Ceauşescu begins in Timișoara. On 20 December, Timișoara is declared the first Communism Free Town. 1,104 people died and 3,352 were wounded.
- 1992 – Second democratic legislative elections in Romania, first local elections. Viorel Oancea becomes the Mayor of Timișoara.

== Sources ==
- Pálosfalvi, Tamás (2018). From Nicopolis to Mohács: A History of Ottoman-Hungarian Warfare, 1389–1526. The Ottoman Empire and Its Heritage: Politics, Society and Economy 63. Leiden: Brill. ISBN 978-90-04-37565-9.
- Engel, Pál (2001). The Realm of St Stephen: A History of Medieval Hungary, 895–1526. I.B. Tauris Publishers. ISBN 1-86064-061-3.
- Gáll, Erwin (2013). Az Erdélyi-medence, a Partium és a Bánság 10-11. századi temetői [10th-11th-century Cemeteries from the Transylvanian Basin, the Partium and the Banat] (in Hungarian). Szegedi Tudományegyetem Régészeti Tanszéke, Magyar Nemzeti Múzeum, Magyar Tudományos Akadémia Bölcsészettudományi Kutatóközpont Régészeti Intézet. ISBN 978-963-306-197-8.
- Petrovics, István (2008). A középkori Temesvár: Fejezetek a Bega-parti város 1552 előtti történetéből [Medieval Timișoara: Chapters of the History of the Town on the Bega before 1552] (in Hungarian). JATE Press. ISBN 978-963-482-867-9.
- Petrovics, István (2009). "Foreign Ethnic Groups in the Towns of Southern Hungary in the Middle Ages". In Keene, Derek; Nagy, Balázs; Szende, Katalin (eds.). Segregation-Integration-Assimilation: Religious and Ethnic Groups in the Medieval Towns of Central and Eastern Europe. Ashgate. pp. 67–88. ISBN 978-0-7546-6477-2.
- Sebők, Ferenc (1994). "Temesvár". In Kristó, Gyula; Engel, Pál; Makk, Ferenc (eds.). Korai magyar történeti lexikon (9–14. század) [Encyclopedia of the Early Hungarian History (9th–14th centuries)] (in Hungarian). Akadémiai Kiadó. p. 669. ISBN 963-05-6722-9.
