= Battle of Slankamen (1717) =

1717 battle

- Part of the Austro-Turkish War (1716–1718)
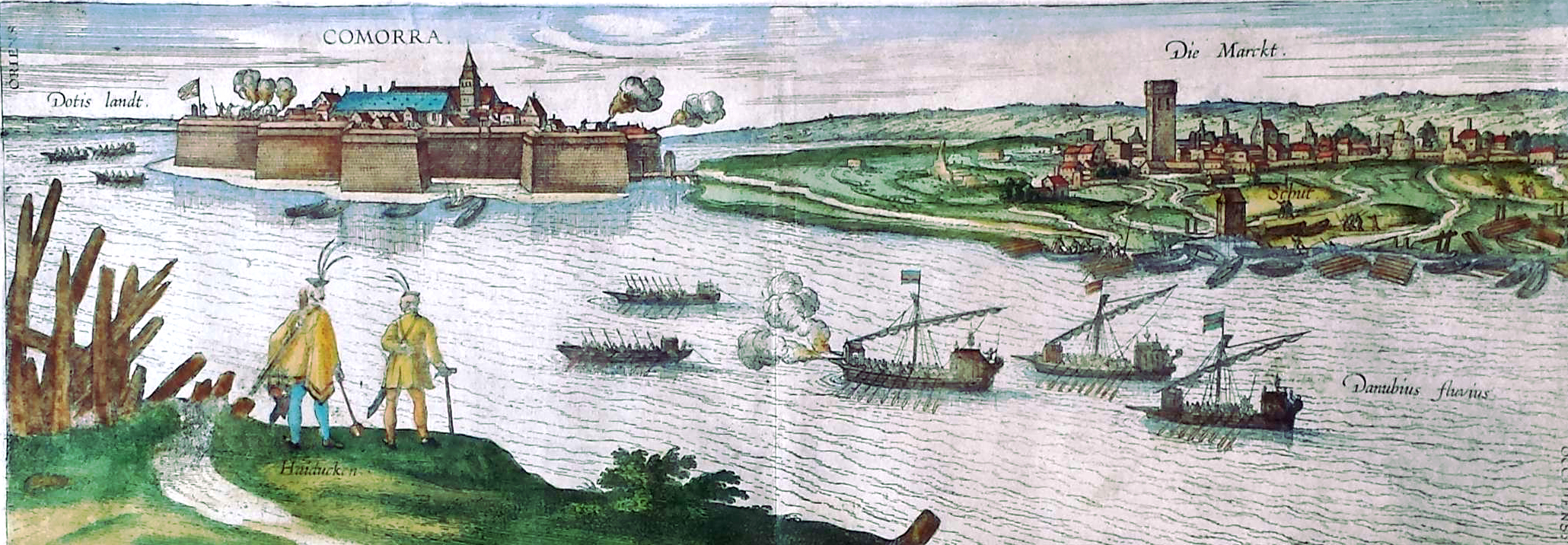
- Šajkaši ships, where the Austrian fleet mainly consisted of.
| Date | 16 April 1717 |
| Location | Stari Slankamen, Serbia |
| Result | Ottoman victory |

Belligerents
| Habsburg monarchy | Ottoman Empire |

Commanders and leaders
| Ernest von Petrasch (POW) | Unknown |

Strength
| 23 Chaika | 60 ships |

Casualties and losses
| Heavy | Unknown |

The Battle of Slankamen was a naval engagement between the Ottoman fleet and the Austrians, who were returning from Pančevo, in the Danbue. The Ottomans won the battle and captured the Austrian commander.

== Prelude ==
In 1717, Count Claude Florimond de Mercy found a way to transport supplies to Pančevo from Petrovaradin without passing through Belgrade. The waterway made it possible to transport supplies. The count appointed Lieutenant Colonel Ernest Freiherr von Petrasch for this mission. Ernest was a cavalry officer but inexperienced in naval warfare. Ernest gathered his Šajkaši, which was manned by Hajduks for this mission. The Ottomans, however, were alerted and traveled across the Danube from Belgrade with 60 manned ships to prevent further transport. They initially took the position at Stari Slankamen.

== Battle ==
On April 16, Ernest left with a fleet of 23 Chaika carrying 1,500 quintals of flour and 13,000 bushels of oats. Ernest successfully reached the place and loaded the supplies. After that, the Austrian fleet returned back; however, they met the Ottoman navy ahead of them. A battle ensued, which turned out in favor of the Ottomans when a powder explosion was triggered on the ship of Lieutenant Colonel Petrasch by a cannon shot, killing the majority of the crew. Petrasch managed to escape to another ship, but during the confusion, all the ships turned toward the shore, and, in full panic, the crew, who might have believed their commander was dead, fled.

The lieutenant colonel was now forced to land, but he was captured by the Ottomans, who had quickly turned upstream again, along with his retinue, which consisted of only five people. One officer managed to at least bring the transport back to Petrovaradin unharmed.

== Aftermath ==
The success at Slankamen was declared a great victory by the Ottomans; in any case, the Austrians lost such a capable officer as Petrasch during the course of this war. Ernest was chained and taken captive to Adrianople, then to Istanbul.

== Sources ==
- K. und K. Kriegsarchiv (1891), Campaigns of Prince Eugene of Savoy according to the field acts and other authentic sources, Vol 16. (In German).
- Graf Andreas Thürheim (1878), Field Marshal Ludwig Andreas Graf von Khevehüller-Frankenburg (In German).
- József Bánlaky: Military history of the Hungarian nation (MEK-OSZK), 0014/1149. The Sava and Bosnian operations (In Hungarian).
- Constantin von Wurzbach (1870), Biographical Dictionary of the Empire of Austria (In German).
