= Siege of Mehadia =

Siege of Mehadiye (1717)
- Part of the Austro-Turkish War (1716–1718)
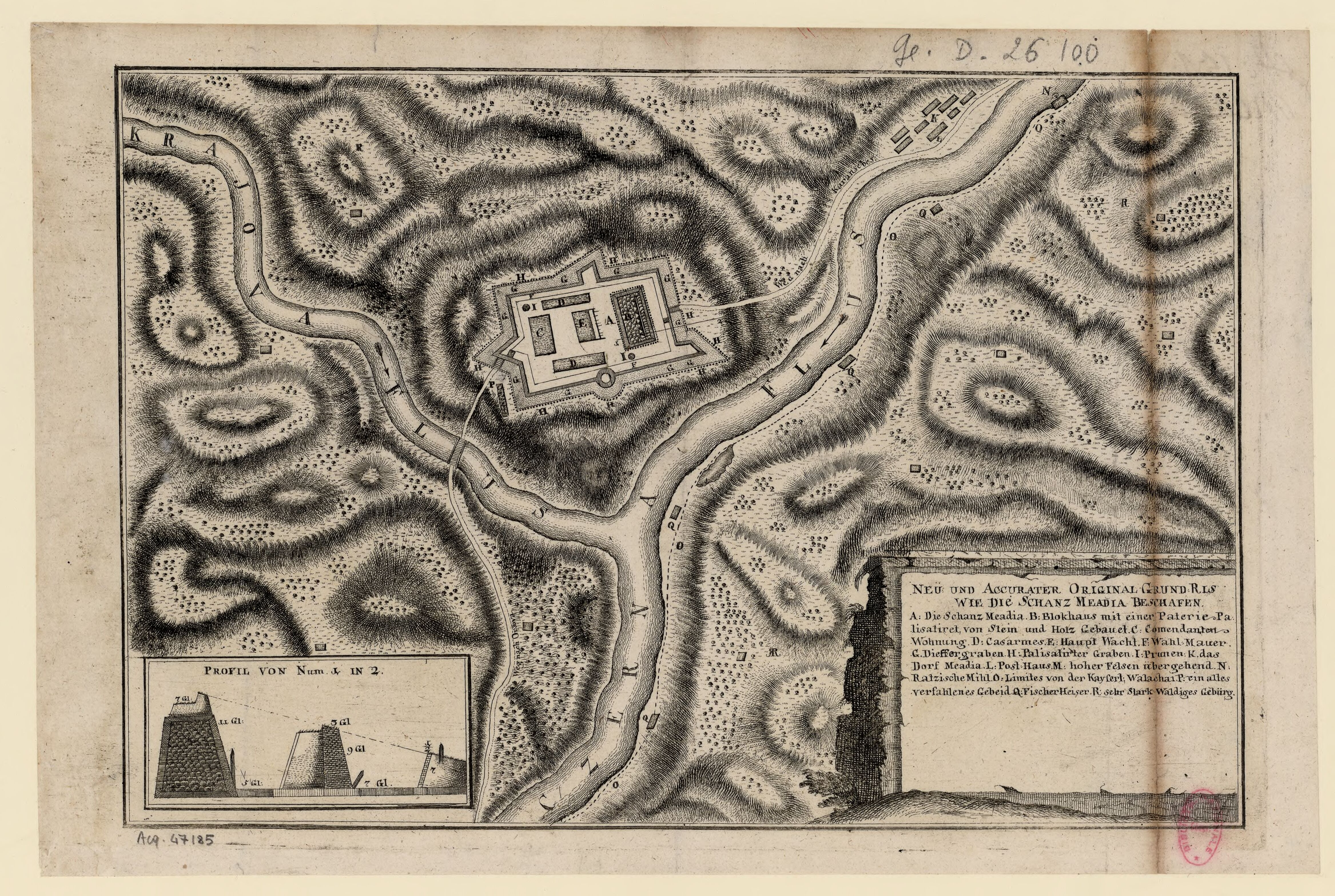
- Mehadia in 18th century
Date	26–28 July 1717
Location	Mehadia
Result	Ottoman victory
Territorial changes	Ottomans captured Mehadia

Belligerents
Habsburg monarchy	Ottoman Empire

Commanders and leaders
Major Herlenval	Rejeb Pasha

Strength
1,000 men	20,000 men

Casualties and losses
600 killed or wounded	2,000 killed or wounded

The siege of Mehadia was a military engagement between the Ottomans and the Asutrian garrison of Mehadia. After a siege of 3 days and heroic defense, the Austrians surrendered to the Ottomans.

== Prelude ==
During the siege of Belgdrade by Prince Eugene of Savoy, a large Ottoman army, which was coming to liberate Belgrade from the siege, began to appear in the lies of the Habsburg camp; now it was important to face the Ottoman army in order not to be exposed to the destructive force between the double fire of the two sides. The Grand Vizier finally crossed the Morava River. From there, he immediately sent part of his army to Banat and capture Mehadia from the Austrians.

The Austrian garrison in July 1717 consisted of about 1,000 troops. The garrison leader, Major Herlenval, received news of an upcoming march of an Ottoman army of 20,000 Turks, Tartars, and Hungarians on horseback, many camels, and 800 carts.

== Siege ==
On July 26, the Ottoman cavalry arrived at the narrow pass south of Mehadia and crossed it despite the artillery fire from the fort. Shortly after, Janissaries were seen on the height to the east, who immediately rushed to attack the main fortification in the valley, but from a higher fort, they were so heavily bombarded that they could not hold their ground and retreated. They could do nothing even on the northern front of that enclosure opposite the old castle; the garrison heroically defended the parapet and captured three flags from the assailants. Two other assaults were also repelled.

The Ottomans then turned their attention to the fort on the height. The Austrians there repelled them twice, but when the fire was set on that structure, which was a wooden blockhouse, the Turks stormed it and captured it. Now the main fort in the valley was surrounded. The Ottomans established themselves on the heights and set up, in a good position, 9 pieces of artillery, against which the defenders sheltered themselves with mantles, allowing them to repel a second assault on the morning of July 27. But an Ottoman detachment approached the gate of Karansebes, got under the palisades, uprooted them, and set fire to the foundations of the parapet.

This situation made the Major realize that further resistance is futile and soon the Ottomans would capture the fort. The garrison lost 600 between dead and wounded, and only 400 were capable of fighting. The fortifications were already partly ruined, the position surrounded by an enemy so numerous, without hope of assistance, and some fires had also broken out that could no longer be extinguished. Von Herlenval decided to surrender, on the condition of exiting freely with all honors, leaving however the cannons and provisions. He departed on July 28. The Ottomans had suffered 2,000 casualties during the siege.

== Sources ==
- Johann Wilhelm Zinkeisen (2011), History of the Ottoman Empire, Vol V (In Turkish).
- Moriz von Angeli (1891), Campaigns of Prince Eugene of Savoy according to the field acts and other authentic sources (In German).
- Ludwig Matuschka (1900), War against the Turks 1716-18 campaigns 1717-18 (In Italian).
