= Austro-Turkish War (1716–1718) =

War between the Habsburg monarchy and the Ottoman Empire in the 18th century

- Part of the Ottoman–Habsburg wars and the Ottoman–Venetian War (1714–1718)
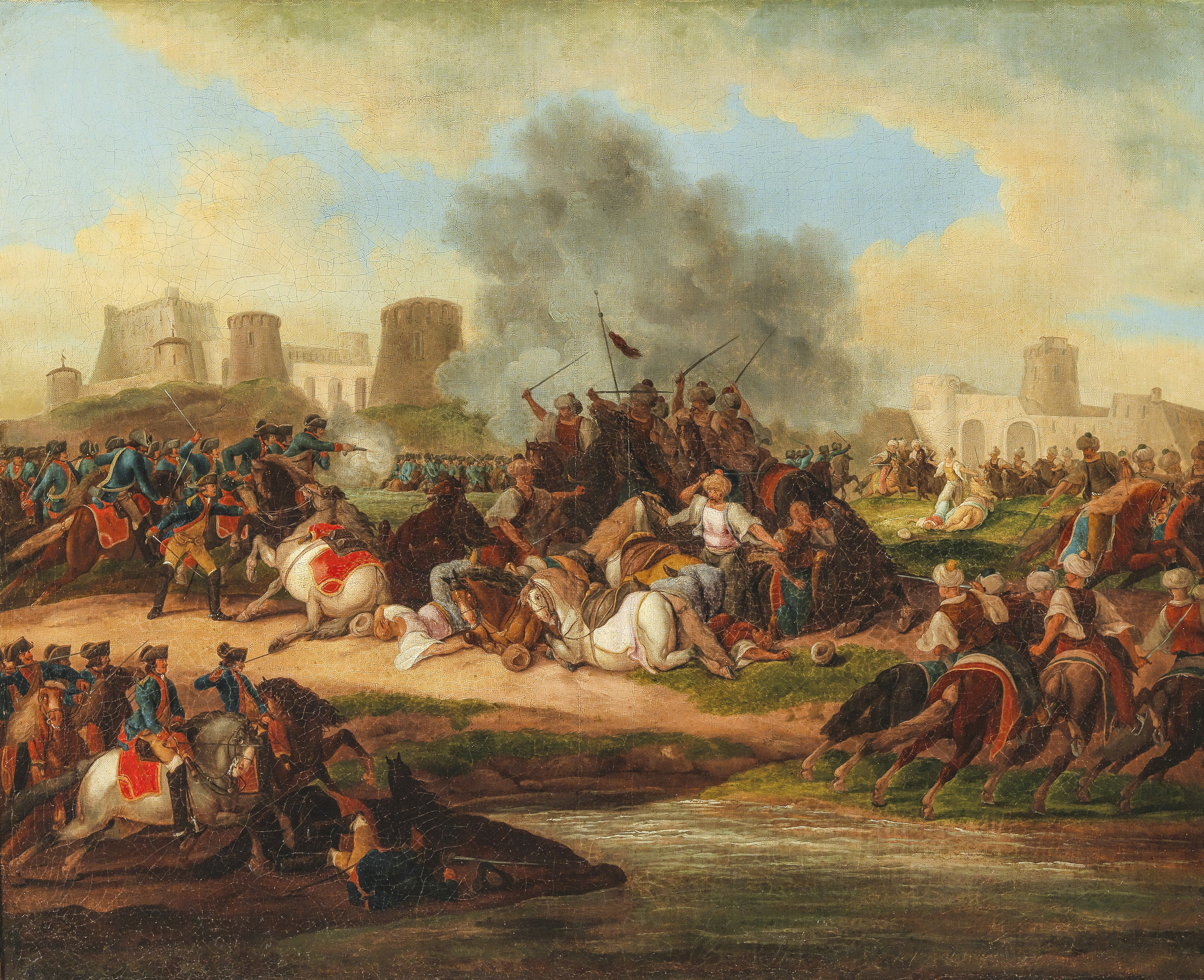
- The Battle of Petrovaradin by Georg Philipp Rugendas
Date	13 April 1716 – 21 July 1718
Location	Sanjak of Smederevo, the Military Frontier, Bosnia, the Banat and Transylvania
Result	Habsburg victory: Treaty of Passarowitz
Territorial changes	The Banat, Serbia, Oltenia and portions of northern Bosnia were ceded to the Habsburgs

Belligerents
Habsburg Monarchy; (Habsburg monarchy) Serbian Militia (Note: As well as Serbian garrison troops during the Battle of Petrovaradin); Duchy of Württemberg; Electorate of Bavaria; Republic of Venice; Hajduks; Serbian rebels	Ottoman Empire; Crimean Khanate; Moldavia; Wallachia; Eyalet of Bosnia

Commanders and leaders
Eugene of Savoy; Alexander von Württemberg; Antoniotto Adorno; János Pálffy; Maurice de Saxe; Alessandro Maffei	(Ottoman Empire) Ali Pasha † (Ottoman Empire) Halil Pasha (Ottoman Empire) Numan Pasha (Ottoman Empire) Ibrahim Pasha (Ottoman Empire) Tahir Pasha; Mihai Racoviță; Nicholas Mavrocordatos (POW); John Mavrocordatos

Casualties and losses
(Habsburg monarchy) 40,000 killed or wounded	(Ottoman Empire) 80,000 killed or wounded (includes losses from the Ottoman-Venetian War)

Austro-Turkish War of 1716–1718
Battle
2 = Karlowitz & Petrovaradin
Siege
3 = Temeșvar, 5 = Trebinje, 7 = Belgrade
Other
11 = Vučitrn

The Austro-Turkish War (1716–1718) was fought between the Habsburg monarchy and the Ottoman Empire. The 1699 Treaty of Karlowitz was not an acceptable permanent agreement for the Ottoman Empire. Twelve years after Karlowitz, it began the long-term prospect of taking revenge for its defeat at the Battle of Vienna in 1683. First, the army of Turkish Grand Vizier Baltacı Mehmet defeated Peter the Great's Russian Army in the Russo-Turkish War (1710–1713). Then, during the Ottoman–Venetian War (1714–1718), Ottoman Grand Vizier Damat Ali reconquered the Morea from the Venetians. As the guarantor of the Treaty of Karlowitz, the Austrians threatened the Ottoman Empire, which caused it to declare war in April 1716.

On 2 August 1716, the first engagement of the war took place at the Battle of Karlowitz, which resulted in an Ottoman victory. Three days later, Prince Eugene of Savoy defeated the Turks at the Battle of Petrovaradin. The Banat and its capital, Temesvár, were conquered by Prince Eugene in October 1716. The following year, after the Austrians captured Belgrade, the Turks sought peace, and the Treaty of Passarowitz was signed on 21 July 1718.

The Habsburgs gained control of Lower Syrmia, the city of Temesvár (the last Ottoman fortress in Hungary) and its region (establishing the Banat of Temeswar), and also gained Belgrade with portions of central Serbia and Bosnian sections of Posavina. Principality of Wallachia (an autonomous Ottoman vassal) ceded Oltenia (Lesser Wallachia) to the Habsburg monarchy, which established the Banat of Craiova. The Turks retained control only of the territory south of the Danube river. The pact stipulated for Venice to surrender the Morea to the Ottomans, but it retained the Ionian Islands and also made some minor gains in border regions of Ottoman Bosnia, thus extending the Venetian Dalmatia.

== List of events ==
Name	Date	Result
Battle of Karlowitz	2 August 1716	Ottoman victory
Battle of Petrovaradin	5 August 1716	Habsburg victory
Siege of Temeşvar	31 August – 12 October 1716	Habsburg victory
Siege of Trebinje	26 November 1716	Ottoman victory
Battle of Iași (1717)	January 1717	Moldavian–Tatar victory
Battle of Veliko Gradište	29 January 1717	Ottoman victory
Battle of Slankamen (1717)	16 April 1717	Ottoman victory
Siege of Belgrade	18 June – 21 August 1717	Habsburg victory
Siege of Mehadia	26 –28 July 1717	Ottoman victory
Siege of Zvornik	15 September – 3 October 1717	Ottoman victory
Siege of Novi	5 – 19 September 1717	Ottoman victory
Uprising in Vučitrn	fall 1717 – summer 1718	Ottoman victory

== Siege of Belgrade (1717) ==
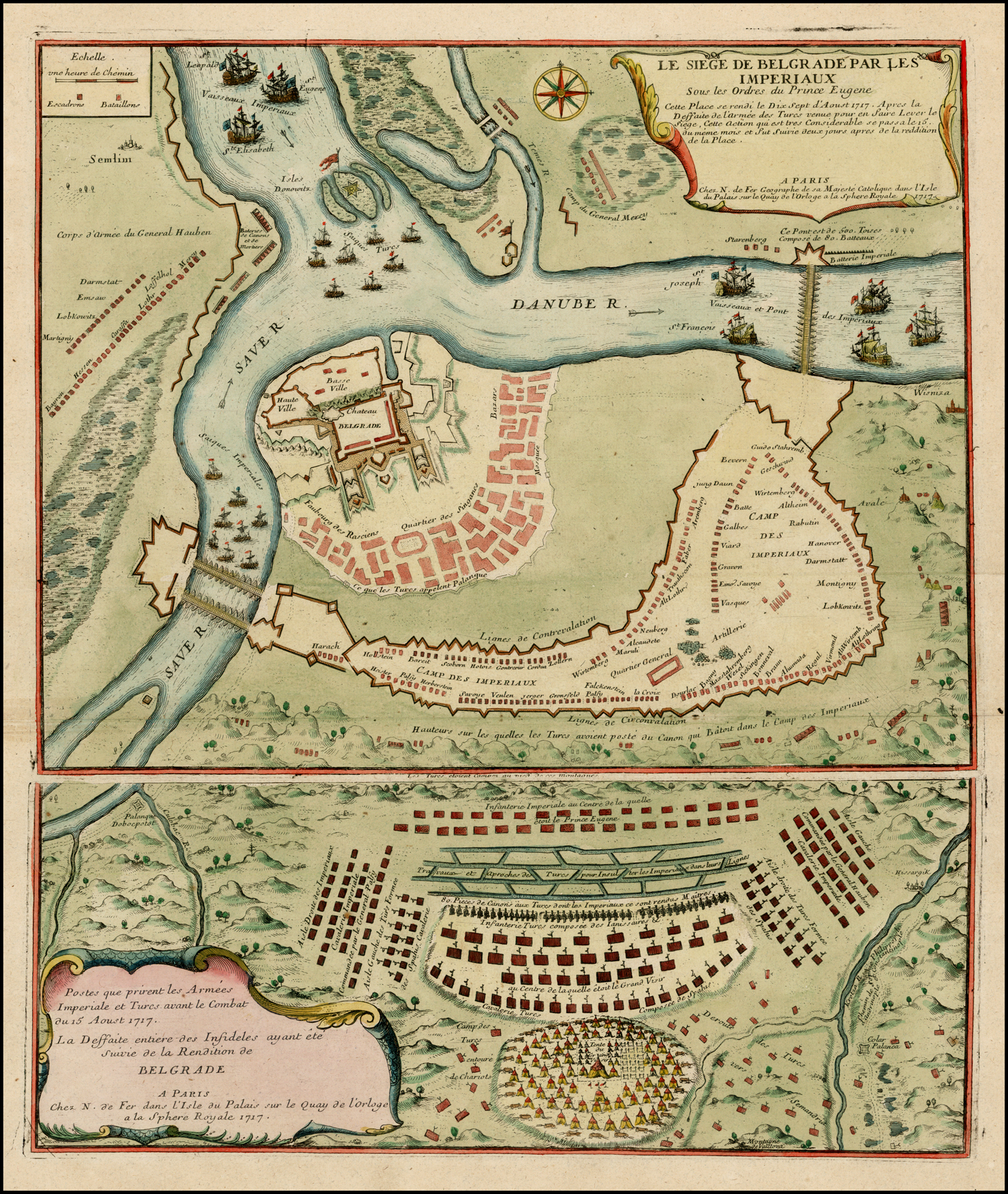
A French map of the siege of Belgrade, showing the fortress and the environs, with the respective positions of the Imperial and the Ottoman armies

On the advice of one of his generals, Eugene chose to cross the Danube, approaching Belgrade from the east and rear, surprising the Ottomans who did not expect the enemy to cross the river at that point. He established the first camp at Višnjica the highest point, some 5 km (3.1 mi) away from Belgrade. On 18 June the city was surrounded, and thus the Siege of Belgrade had commenced. Eugene deployed his artillery while the Imperial troops began digging trenches, in a semicircle from the Danube to the Sava, both in front of the fortress and at the rear to cover the imperials in the event of the arrival of a Turkish relief army. The fortification lines, 16 km (9.9 mi) long, were completed on 9 July, providing a connection between Danube and Sava rivers. The right side of the camp was protected by the Habsburg Danube flotilla. Count von Hauben was sent to establish a bridgehead west of the Sava for a supply and communication route to Petrovaradin and a liaison to the troops in Zemun.

The Ottoman defenders in Belgrade numbered 30,000 men, under the command of Serasker Mustafa Pasha, who had been commander of the Temeşvar Fortress. He was one of the best Ottoman commanders. Mustafa was ready to fight until reinforcements arrived, bombarding the imperial soldiers from above. Prince Eugene was informed that the huge Ottoman army of about 140,000 men sent to relieve Belgrade was approaching under the command of Grand Vizier (Hacı) Halil Pasha. This army arrived on 28 July. However, instead of taking action against the besiegers, they began to dig trenches. Prince Eugene's troops were caught between the fortress and the relief army in a dangerous crossfire. Because of losses to cannon fire as well as malaria, the strength of the Austrian army slowly diminished. The Ottomans wanted to let the enemy wear themselves down in a long siege. While the situation was rather worrying for the imperial troops, the Grand Vizier chose to wait. Even when 40,000 Crimean Tatars arrived on 12 August, Halil Pasha, still reluctant to fight Eugene's army, chose to gather another war council instead of attacking.

On 14 August, Belgrade was suddenly shaken by a powerful explosion: a mortar shell launched from Zemun struck the ammunition store inside the fortress killing 3,000 defenders in the explosion. Prince Eugene immediately chose to confront the massive Ottoman relief army. Summoning his commanders for a council of war, he ordered a surprise attack, planned in the smallest details, for the night between 15 and 16 August.

Either I will take Belgrade or the Turks will take me

— Prince Eugene to his generals, 15 August 1717

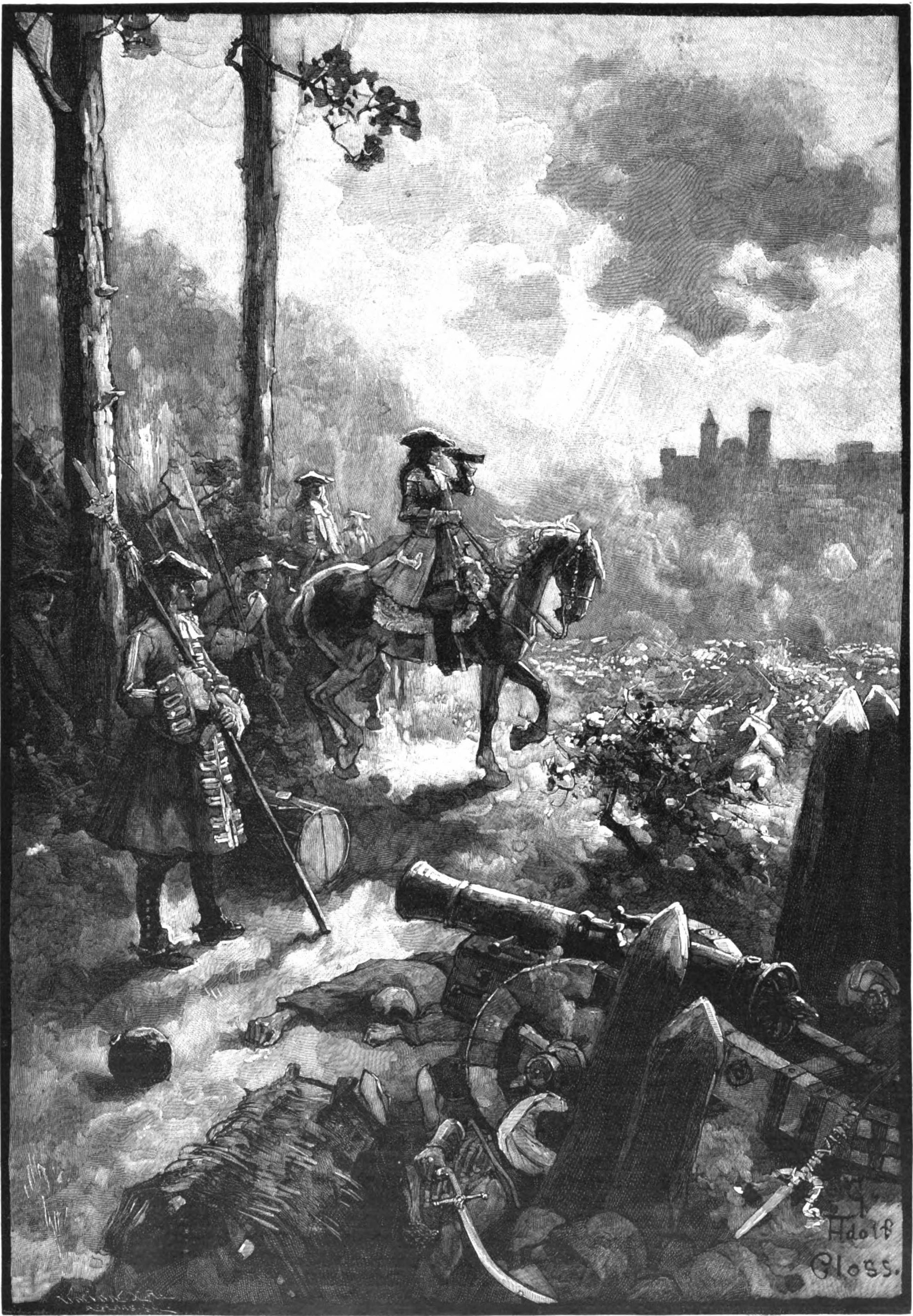
Eugene of Savoy surveying the Battlefield on 16 August 1717

According to the war order, the infantry under Field Marshal Charles Alexander, Duke of Württemberg would hold the center, while the imperial cavalry commanded by Hungarian Field Marshal Count János Pálffy would form at the left and right wings of the entrenchment. Apart from eight battalions, about 10,000 men, left under Field Marshal Count George de Brown (Note: Maximilian Ulysses Browne's uncle) to hold the trenches facing the fortress, and four infantry battalions under Count Peter Josef de Viard protecting the camp and the bridgeheads, the entire army was involved in the attack. In total this included 52 infantry battalions, 53 grenadier companies, and 180 cavalry squadrons, supported by 60 cannons, a force of about 60,000 soldiers.

On the Ottoman right side were 10,000 county soldiers under Rumeli Beylerbeyi as well as 20,000 sipahis and armored silahdar. On the left were 10,000 provincial soldiers and the 40,000 Crimean cavalry under Beylerbeyi Maktulzade Ali Pasha. In the center were 80,000 janissaries, making a total of 160,000 soldiers.

The attack started as scheduled before midnight of 15 August, a heavy fog arose and covered the battlefield, according to Lieutenant General of Infantry Maffei the fog was so thick it quickly became impossible to distinguish between friend and enemy. Württemberg advanced the Imperial center with Count Pálffy's cavalry on left and right. The night attack surprised the Ottomans and they woke in panic and confusion. However several Ottoman infantry battalions managed to corner the right side of Pálffy's cavalry after it lost its way in the fog this already disrupting the order of war. The Ottoman infantry opened fire with support from their left Sipahi cavalry. General Count Claude Florimond de Mercy with the second cavalry line attacked immediately in support of Pálffy, followed by the infantry of Maximilian Adam Graf Starhemberg. The thrust succeeded in pushing the Ottomans back all the way to their trenches. Because of the simultaneous Habsburg cavalry and infantry attack, the Ottomans retreated leaving their batteries.

After the first hours of fighting, while the sun rose but the intense fog still covered the battlefield, the Ottomans perceived an opening in the center of the Austrian array and attacked in force. The Ottomans found themselves in between the two wings with a clear advantage but seemed to be unaware of it. Prince Eugene understood that he could turn the situation to his advantage since he could anticipate now the Ottoman battle plan. He ordered von Braunschweig-Bevern's second infantry line to counterattack, placing the Bavarian troops in the front. Then Eugene personally led the attack at the head of the Austrian cavalry reserves. Although Eugene was wounded, his cuirassiers and hussars struck the flanks of the Ottoman janissaries in a tremendous onslaught. The left and right Habsburg wings managed to finally restore contact with the help of the central infantry. Eugene's attack completely changed the situation. It not only pushed the enemy back but also took the trenches, throwing the Ottoman camp into turmoil and causing many soldiers to flee. The Ottoman 18-gun battery on the Badjina Heights was captured and the remaining troops withdraw to the camp where the Grand Vizier ordered a full retreat.

After 10 hours of fighting, the battle was over. Ottoman losses numbered between 15,000 and 20,000 men, including Erzurum governor Mehmet Pasha, Chief Admiral Ibrahim Pasha and Rumeli governor Vezir şatr Ali Pasha, 5,000 wounded soldiers and all of their 166 artillery pieces. The Austrians suffered fewer than 6,000 losses, Pálffy, Württemberg, and the young Maurice de Saxe were wounded, and Prince Eugene was wounded for the 13th time. Killed included Field Marshal Count Hauben, 87 officers and 1767 soldiers; wounded 223 officers and 3179 soldiers.

The Grand Vizier and the remains of his army escaped first to Smederevo then Niš. They were harassed by Serbian infantry, Serbian militias, Hajduks, and the Habsburg light cavalry made up of Hungarian hussars.

The trophies of war included nearly two hundred cannons, one hundred and fifty flags, nine horsetails, and the captured war chest. James Oglethorpe, an aide de camp of the prince, reported that Eugene had a Te Deum performed in the tent of the Grand Vizier on 19 August after taking possession of it.

The garrison, deprived of relief and with soldiers about to revolt, surrendered five days later to the Austrians, on 21 August, in exchange for safe passage from the city, which Eugene granted; 25,000 residents were given the right to freely leave the city honorably. The entire Muslim population together with the remaining Ottoman garrison troops left unhurt taking their basic possessions with them.

== Aftermath ==
Belgrade was transferred into Habsburg hands, after 196 years of Ottoman rule. Prince Eugene crowned his career with a great victory and the Ottoman dominance in the Balkans suffered a severe blow. A year later, the Treaty of Passarowitz was signed, completing the Treaty of Karlowitz of 1699. Habsburg Monarchy obtained at the expense of the Ottoman Empire the Banat of Temesvár which returned to the Kingdom of Hungary, Belgrade with much of central Serbia, Lesser Wallachia (Oltenia), and some other border areas. Thus Habsburgs reached their maximum expansion in the Balkans. Prince Eugene of Savoy crowned his career as the most successful military leader of his time, and retired from active military service. After this defeat, the Ottoman Empire would no longer hope to expand in Europe but merely sought to retain conquered territory. Belgrade would remain a territory under the domination of the Habsburg Monarchy for over twenty years until new Ottoman–Habsburg rivalries resulted in the city being reconquered by the Ottomans in 1739.

== Images ==
Siege of Belgrade
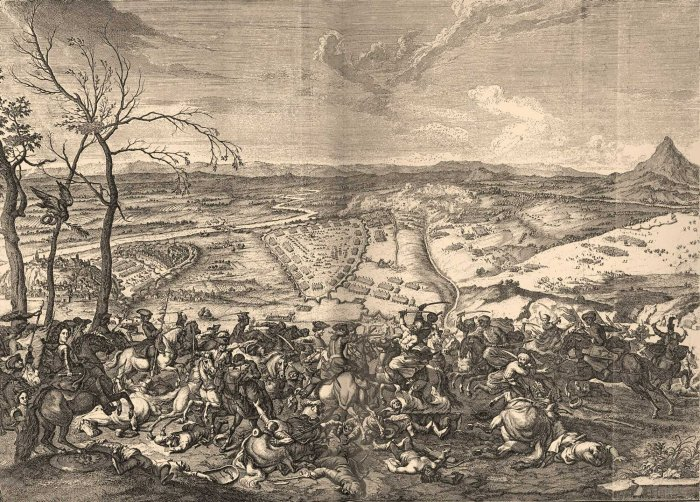
The Battle of Belgrade
by Jan van Huchtenburg

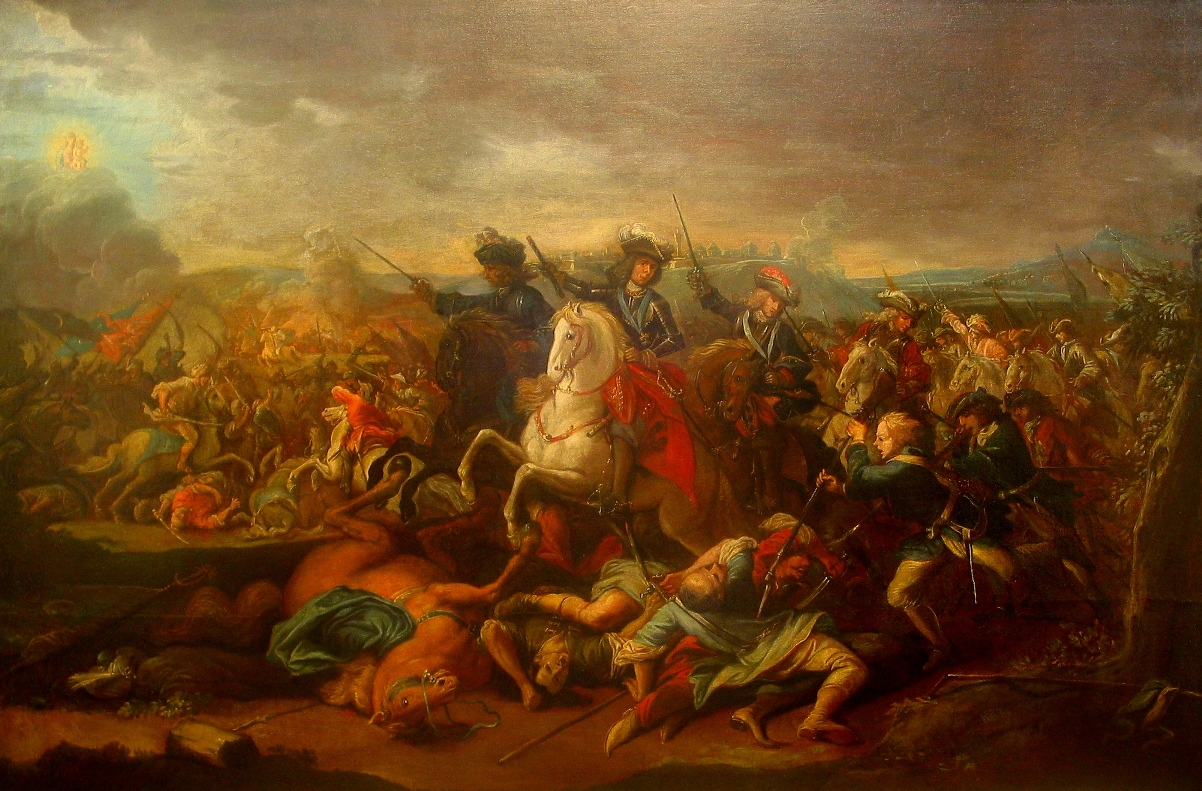
Eugene of Savoy at the Battle of Belgrade
by Johann Gottfried Auerbach

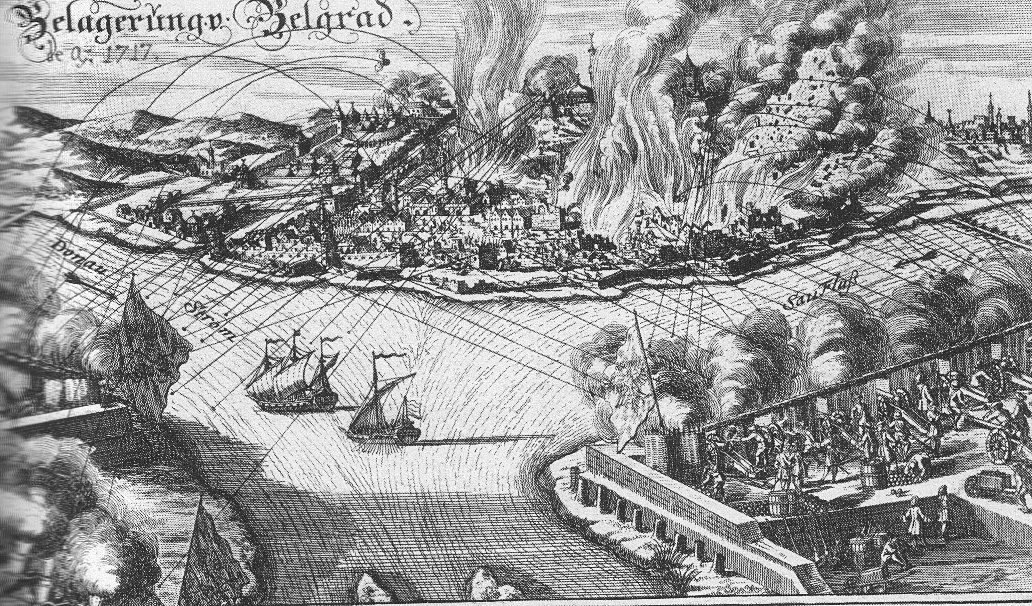
The Siege of Belgrade
engraving

== Sources ==
- Ágoston, Gábor (2011). "The Ottoman Wars and the Changing Balance of Power along the Danube in the Early Eighteenth Century". The Peace of Passarowitz, 1718. West Lafayette: Purdue University Press. pp. 93–108. ISBN 978-1-61249-195-0.
- Ćirković, Sima (2004). The Serbs. Malden: Blackwell Publishing. ISBN 9781405142915.
- Dabić, Vojin S. (2011). "The Habsburg-Ottoman War of 1716-1718 and Demographic Changes in the War-Afflicted Territories". The Peace of Passarowitz, 1718. West Lafayette: Purdue University Press. pp. 191–208. ISBN 978-1-61249-195-0.
- Heppner, Harald; Schanes, Daniela (2011). "The Impact of the Treaty of Passarowitz on the Habsburg Monarchy". The Peace of Passarowitz, 1718. West Lafayette: Purdue University Press. pp. 53–62. ISBN 978-1-61249-195-0.
- Hochedlinger, Michael (2013). Austria's Wars of Emergence: War, State and Society in the Habsburg Monarchy, 1683–1797. London & New York: Routledge. ISBN 9781317887935.
- Karagöz, Hakan (2018). "The 1717 Siege of Belgrade and the Ottoman War Equipment Captured by the Habsburgs after the Siege". Belgrade 1521-1867. Belgrade: The Institute of History. pp. 129–154. ISBN 978-86-7743-132-7.
- Mrgić, Jelena (2011). "Tracking the mapmaker: The role of Marsigli's itineraries and surveys at Karlowitz and Passarowitz". The Peace of Passarowitz, 1718. West Lafayette: Purdue University Press. pp. 221–237. ISBN 978-1-61249-195-0.
- Murphey, Rhoads (2011). "Twists and Turns in the Diplomatic Dialogue: the Politics of Peacemaking in the Early Eighteenth Century". The Peace of Passarowitz, 1718. West Lafayette: Purdue University Press. pp. 73–91. ISBN 978-1-61249-195-0.
- Pelidija, Enes (2011). "The Influence of the Peace of Passarowitz on Bosnia". The Peace of Passarowitz, 1718. West Lafayette: Purdue University Press. pp. 111–130. ISBN 978-1-61249-195-0.
- Pešalj, Jovan (2011). "Making a Prosperous Peace: Habsburg Diplomacy and Economic Policy at Passarowitz". The Peace of Passarowitz, 1718. West Lafayette: Purdue University Press. pp. 141–157. ISBN 978-1-61249-195-0.
- Peters, Martin (2011). "The Peace of Passarowitz in the Historical Sciences, 1718-1829". The Peace of Passarowitz, 1718. West Lafayette: Purdue University Press. pp. 39–50. ISBN 978-1-61249-195-0.
- Shapira, Dan D. Y. (2011). "The Crimean Tatars and the Austro-Ottoman Wars". The Peace of Passarowitz, 1718. West Lafayette: Purdue University Press. pp. 131–140. ISBN 978-1-61249-195-0.
- Simić, Vladimir (2011). "Patriotism and Propaganda: Habsburg Media Promotion of the Peace Treaty of Passarowitz". The Peace of Passarowitz, 1718. West Lafayette: Purdue University Press. pp. 267–290. ISBN 978-1-61249-195-0.
