= Battle of Trencsén =

Part of the Rákóczi's War of Independence

- Part of the Rákóczi's War of Independence
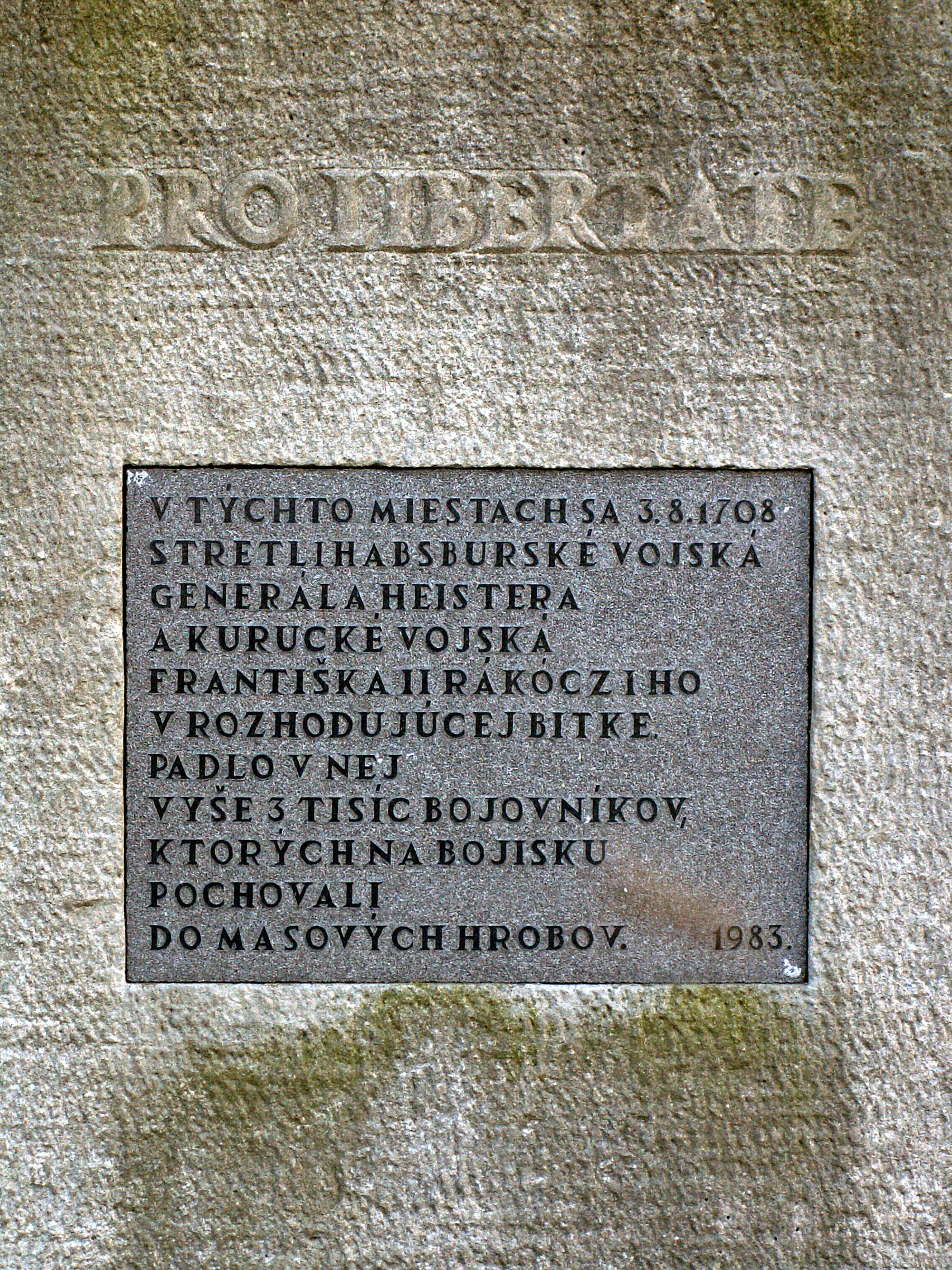
- Memorial of the Battle of Trencsén
Date	3 August 1708
Location	near the villages of Turna, Szoblaho and Lehota, Kingdom of Hungary (now Trenčianska Turná, Soblahov, Mníchova Lehota, Slovakia) 48°51′24″N 18°00′40″E
Result	Habsburg victory

Belligerents
Kuruc Army of Francis II Rákóczi; House of Benyovszky; House of Revay; French auxiliaries	Habsburg Imperial Army; Serbs from Délvidék; House of Ocskay

Commanders and leaders
Francis II Rákóczi; Antoine de La Motte; Lőrinc Pekry	Sigbert Heister; János Pálffy

Strength
15,000 infantry and cavalrymen, 12 cannons	Around 5,000 infantry and cavalrymen, 3,000 Serbian valiant

Casualties and losses
3,000 dead or wounded, 500 POW; 12 cannons captured	200 dead or wounded
- Location within Slovakia Battle of Trencsén (Europe)

The Battle of Trencsén (Hungarian: Trencséni csata, German: Schlacht bei Trentschin, Slovak: Bitka pri Trenčíne) was fought between the Hungarian Kuruc forces of Francis II Rákóczi and the Imperial Army of the Habsburgs. It was part of Rákóczi's eight-year-long War of Independence.

The battle caused great losses for the Kuruc army, forcing them to give up their plans of obtaining allies in the War of the Spanish Succession against the Habsburgs. The battle also meant that the Habsburgs maintained their positions as the Kings of Hungary.

== Background ==
In the year 1708, Francis II Rákóczi decided to march his troops into Silesia, to pave the way for the plans of Friedrich Wilhelm I of Prussia to take the Hungarian crown, thus reinforcing the Silesian Protestants as well. His army started to march down the Váh (Vág) river, and planned to pass by the town of Trencsén (now Trenčín, Slovakia) on their way to Moravia. However, the city was in the hands of a reinforced Habsburg garrison. At first, Rákóczi had no intention to besiege Trencsén, as to not weaken his army, but under pressure of other Kuruc commanders, he decided to do so. The commander of the garrison, Sigbert Heister, found out about the moves of the Kuruc army, and started preparing his soldiers for the attack.

== Battle ==
At the morning of 3 August 1708, 8,000 Habsburg-Serbian soldiers faced 15,000 Kuruc soldiers, with 12 cannons. The right wing of the Hungarian Kuruc army was composed of light cavalry and part of the infantry under command of Lőrinc Pekry. The middle was composed by the artillery, protected by the German cavalry, as well as with the Polish and German carabiniers under command of colonel de la Motte. The left wing was made out of the rest of the infantry. The terrain ahead of them, however, was unclear, with moats going through it. When Sigbert Heister saw the number of Kuruc troops, and their advantageous standing, he decided to retreat into Trencsén Castle. At the moment of giving this order, the Kuruc artillery started firing, with Pekri's wing advancing to attack the Habsburg soldiers while they were still organising.

But the terrain was unsuitable for attack. The terrain was rugged, with two man-made ponds being next to each other, with an embankment between them. Pekri's cavalry started to go through the embankment at the trot. Meanwhile, Pekri was warned that the narrow passage might cause difficulties; he therefore decided to retreat from those positions. While his cavalry started to turn back, it became disorganized, of which the troops of Imperial commander János Pálffy – a loyalist Hungarian – took advantage; they counter-attacked, and caused the disorganized horsemen to flee.

The middle and left wing meanwhile fought off Imperial mercenaries, but the flight of the right wing brought about uncertainty among the troops. Rákóczi tried to impress his soldiers and personally entered the fight. When jumping one of the moats, however, he fell from his horse and lost consciousness. Rumours about his death started to spread between his soldiers, and even the fighting troops started to flee. Heister's cavalry broke the originally three times bigger Kuruc army during the next three hours. As a result, around 3,000 Kuruc soldiers died or were wounded, 500 were captured, along with all of their 12 cannons; Habsburg royalist losses were small in comparison.

== Aftermath ==
The Kuruc troops were heavily defeated in the Battle of Trencsén, revealing that they had smaller fighting capability than their foes. Heister's troops chased the remainder of Rákóczi's soldiers, captured North-Hungarian mining towns, took Nyitra (now Nitra, Slovakia) and started to besiege Érsekújvár (now Nové Zámky, Slovakia). By the end of the year 1708, the Kuruc rebels had lost all of North-western Hungary and part of the Kuruc soldiers joined the Habsburgs army. Soon, the rebels lost Bars, Hont, the town of Zólyom (now Zvolen, Slovakia) and at the beginning of 1709, had to retreat from Liptó (today Liptov region in Slovakia).

In December 1708, Rákóczi tried to save the situation of his declining army by promising freedom and land grants to the peasants who fought by his side. However, this failed to have any notable effect, as peasants and nobles continued deserting from his army.

The growing defeatism and moral decline provoked by the defeat at Trencsén (now Trenčín, Slovakia) therefore marked the beginning of the ultimate defeat of Rákóczi's War for Independence and the perpetuation of the Kingdom of Hungary remaining subjugated to Austrian rule.
