= Battle of Veliko Gradište =

1717 battle

Battle of Gradište (1717)
- Part of the Austro-Turkish War (1716–1718)
Date	29 January 1717
Location	Veliko Gradište, Serbia
Result	Ottoman victory

Belligerents
Habsburg monarchy	Ottoman Empire

Commanders and leaders
Baron von Neipperg; Baron von Stein (POW)	Unknown

Strength
500 men	Unknown

Casualties and losses
210 killed	Unknown

The Battle of Gradište was a military engagement during Austro-Turkish War (1716–1718). The Austrians launched a raid against Veliko Gradište; initially successful, they were ambushed by the Ottomans and suffered heavy losses.

== Battle ==
In 1717, Colonel Baron von Neipperg, stationed at Uj-Palánka, after having previously taken Ottoman ships carrying supplies to Belgrade and sinking others, crossed the river with 200 musketeers, 300 hajduks, and a squad of dragoons; attacked and overwhelmed the Turkish post at Ram, plundered extensively; and returned with 90 horses and 100 heads of cattle. After this success, the Austrians were lured into an ambush in a narrow pass by the Ottomans; they attacked and inflicted heavy losses on them, killing 210 men. The colonel managed to break through the encirclement and escape with his men. The captain, Baron von Stein, was captured in the battle. According to Baron von Stein's account, the mounted commanders were to blame for the misfortune; he had instructed them on how to behave, but instead they allowed themselves to be seized with fear at the sight of the enemy pressing on their flank and behind them and therefore gave themselves up to flight. Captain Stein was then taken from Belgrade to Adrianople, where he was mistreated and put in irons together with an armorer from the regiment.
