= János Pálffy =

Imperial Field marshal and Palatine of Hungary (1664–1751)

Count János V Pálffy de Erdőd
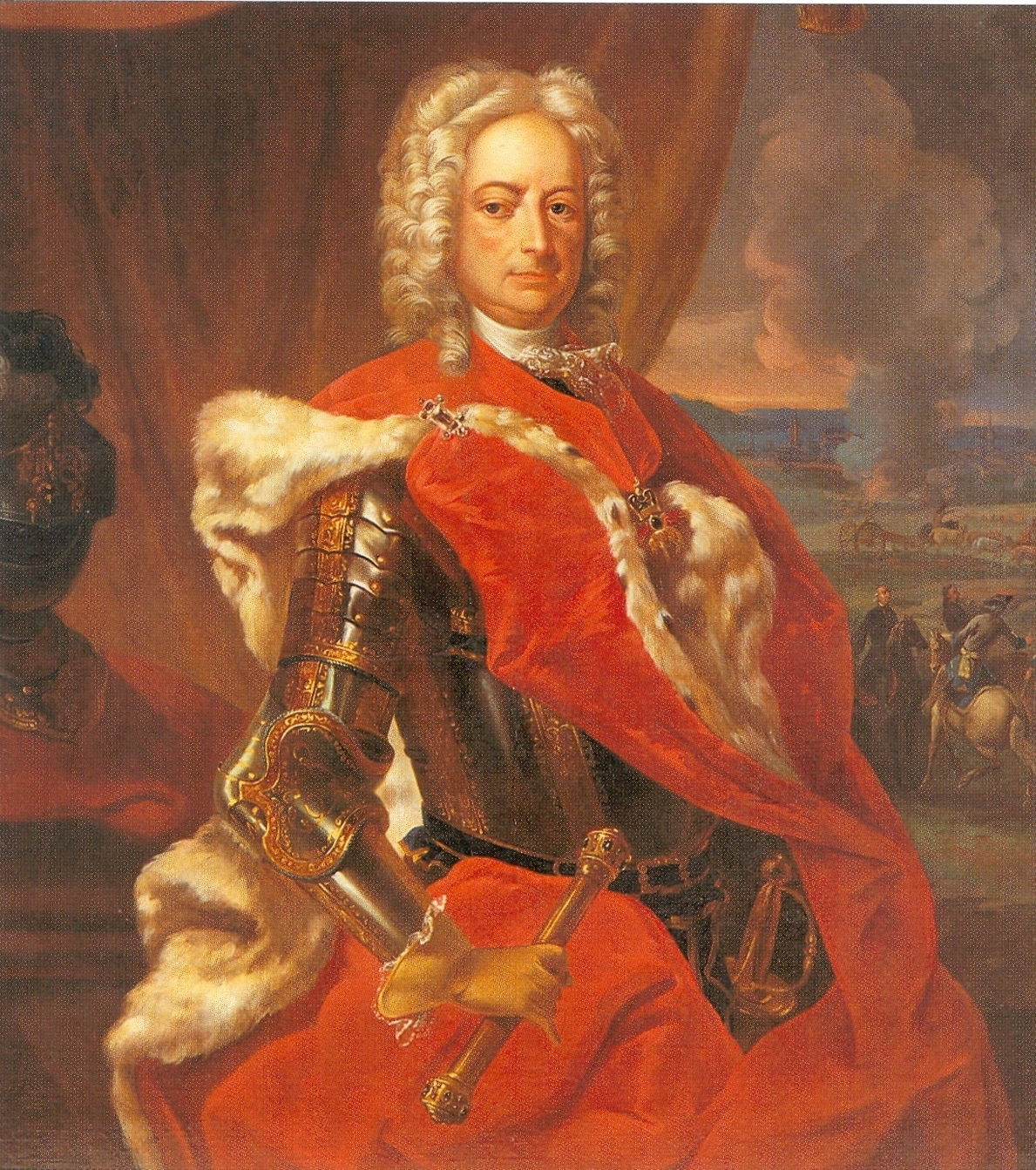
- Portrait of Count János Pálffy

100th Palatine of the Kingdom of Hungary
- In office 22 June 1741 – 24 March 1751
- Monarch: Maria Theresa
- Preceded by: Miklós VI Pálffy
- Succeeded by: Lajos Batthyány

Personal details
- Born: 20 August 1664 Castle of Bibersburg; Kingdom of Hungary (now Slovakia)
- Died: 24 March 1751 (aged 86) Pozsony, Kingdom of Hungary (now Bratislava, Slovakia)
- Resting place: St Martin's Cathedral, Bratislava
- Spouse: Countess Terézia Czobor
- Children: 5
- Relatives: Miklós Pálffy (brother)
- House: Pálffy ab Erdöd

Military service
- Allegiance: Habsburg monarchy
- Branch/service: Imperial Army
- Years of service: 1681–1718
- Rank: Field marshal
- Commands: Cavalry forces in Upper Hungary; Imperial forces during Rákóczi's War of Independence
- Battles/wars: Great Turkish War; Nine Years' War; War of the Spanish Succession; Austro-Turkish War (1716–1718); Battle of Karlowitz; Austro-Turkish War (1737–1739)
- Awards: Order of the Golden Fleece

Johann Bernhard Stephan, Graf Pálffy de Erdőd (Hungarian: Pálffy V. János Bernard István, Croatian: Ivan Pálffy; 20 August 1664 – 24 March 1751) was a Hungarian noble, Imperial Field marshal and Palatine of Hungary.

An accomplished military leader and diplomat during the time of Prince Eugène of Savoy, he was born into one of Hungary's richest families loyal to the House of Habsburg. He joined the Imperial Army in 1681 and rose swiftly through the ranks after distinguishing himself at battles such as Vienna, Párkány and Mohács. He played a key role in Rákóczi's War of Independence, securing victories and negotiating truces with the rebel commander. Beyond his military career, Pálffy took on important diplomatic tasks, helping to secure noble support for the Pragmatic sanction. After the war, he was elected Palatine of Hungary and became a trusted advisor to Empress Maria Theresa until his death in 1751.

== Early life and career ==
János (Johann) Pálffy was the third son of Count Miklós IV Pálffy de Erdőd (1619–1679) and his wife, Countess Maria Eleonora von Harrach zu Rohrau (1634–1693). The Pálffys were part of the elite Hungarian nobility, one of Hungary's richest families. The Hungarian baron status was granted to them as early as 1581. In 1599 they became Imperial Counts of the Holy Roman Empire. Following in the footsteps of his father and elder siblings — his brother Miklós Pálffy was also an Austrian field marshal — he dedicated himself to a military career.

=== Command and rank ===
After studying in Vienna and Parma, Pálffy enlisted in the Imperial Army in 1681, first in the Neuburg, later Isenburg infantry regiments. He was then a cornet in his cousin Field Marshal Johann Carl's Curassier regiment and as such took part in the Battle of Vienna and the Battle of Párkány in 1683. It has been said that he was briefly held captive by the Turks but successfully escaped on a ship.

The following year, in 1684, he became a captain in the same regiment, taking part as such during the Siege of Buda. His valour shone through in the Battle of Mohács (1687), and in 1688 he was appointed Adjutant general under Charles V, Duke of Lorraine. The following year, in 1689, he was made colonel of one of the two Czobor's Hussar Regiments established, under direct order of Emperor Leopold I, by his father-in-law Ádám Czobor. After the death of his father-in-law, he became the owner of that unit, leading his own regiment through the events of the Great Turkish War.

=== Great Turkish War and the Treaty of Szatmár ===
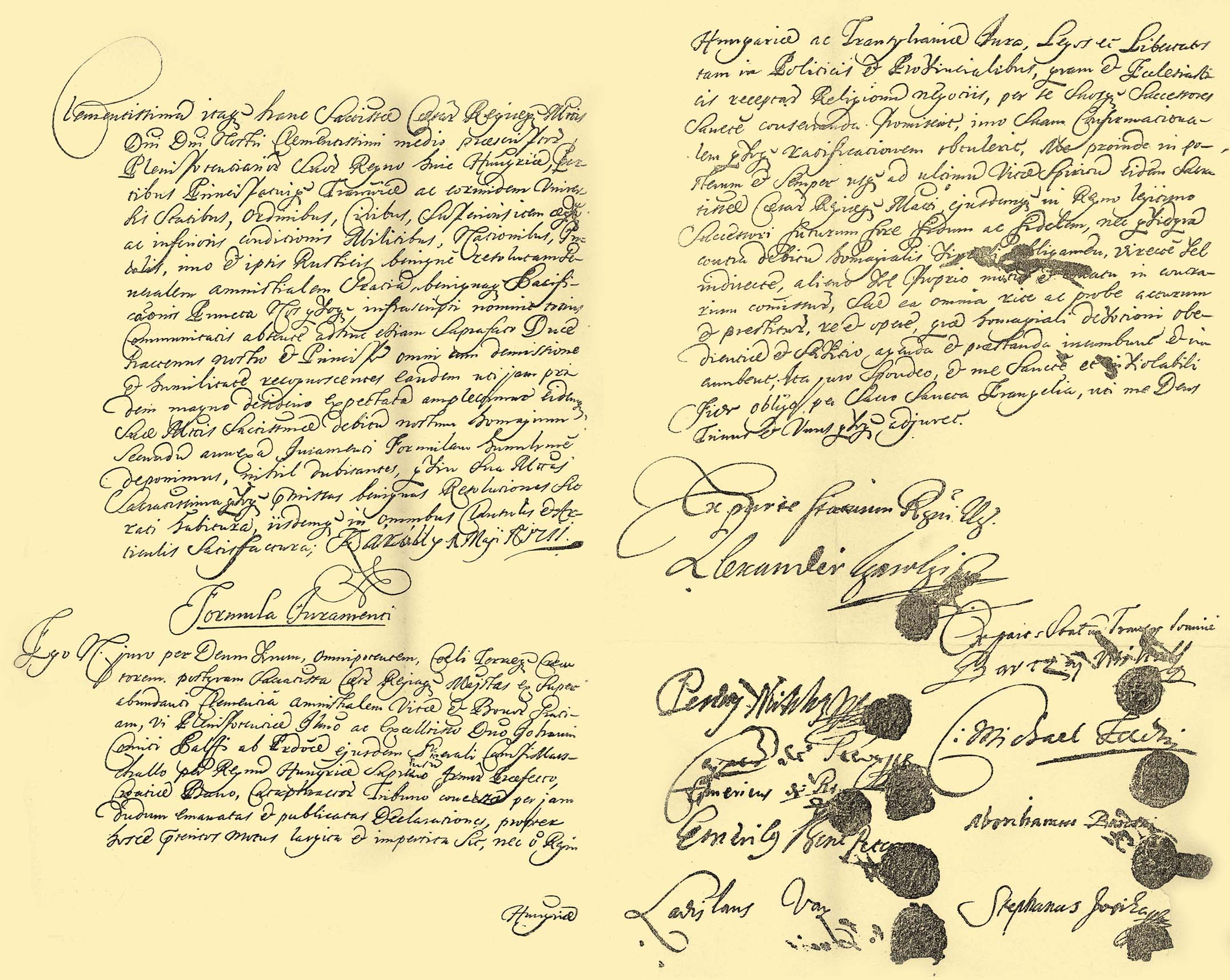
The original document of the Treaty of Szatmár signed on 1 May 1711 bearing the signature of Count Johann Pállfy

In 1693, he engaged in a fatal duel with John Frederick of Württemberg-Stuttgart, the son of Eberhard III, Duke of Württemberg. As a result, he was court-martialled on 15 October 1693 but acquitted. Wounded in a battle against the French led by Claude de Villars, near Mainz in 1695, Pálffy's military prowess continued to flourish, culminating in his appointment as lieutenant general in 1700 then Ban of Croatia, Slavonia and Dalmatia and cavalry general in 1704.

As Rákóczi's War of Independence unfolded, Pálffy assumed command of the cavalry in Hungary in support of the Austrian army, after being recalled from the army that was then fighting against the French. After strengthening his army with new recruitments of Croatian troops, in 1704 he and Ludwig von Herbeville defeated 40,000 rebels and wiped out their cavalry, his troops playing a crucial role in the Battle of Trenčín. He was subsequently appointed Field marshal in 1709 with command over all Upper Hungary troops. As the Imperial General in Chief, he negotiated with Francis II Rákóczi's general Sándor Károlyi, which led to a truce and later the Treaty of Szatmár in 1711 in the fields outside of Majtény in Szatmár, where 12,000 men of Rákóczi's army swore allegiance to the Habsburg dynasty.

=== Austro-Turkish Wars and the Pragmatic Sanction ===
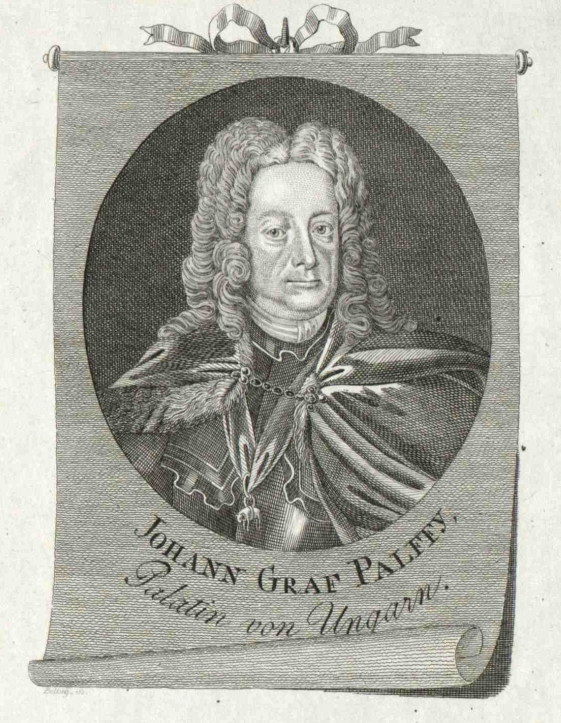
A portrait of János Pálffy as Palatine of Hungary

In the later years, Pálffy actively participated in the Austro-Turkish Wars of 1716–18, exhibiting leadership in various major actions despite sustaining injuries. During the Battle of Petrovaradin he commanded Prince Eugene's cavalry, playing a prominent role in the Imperial victory against the Turks. At the Siege of Temesvár he commanded 16 cavalry regiments before leading the Imperial cavalry at the Siege of Belgrade (1717), where he was wounded.

Post-war, he resumed diplomatic duties while serving as Ban of Croatia, successfully convincing the Hungarian and Croat nobility to embrace the Pragmatic Sanction, assuring the succession of the Emperor to his female descendants in default of male heirs. In the subsequent Austro-Turkish War of 1737–1739, he was sent to Futog after Emperor Charles VI was forced to take part in the dispute between Russia and the Ottoman Empire. Pálffy commanded a 30,000-strong army corps that remained uninvolved in combat as a new peace was signed in Belgrade by the Ottoman Empire on one side and the Habsburg monarchy on the other.

=== Later years ===
In 1731 he became Lord Chief Justice, a position he held until 1741. Following Emperor Charles VI's death in 1740, Pálffy assumed the role of protector for the young Empress Maria Theresa, becoming a key counsellor. Earning in 1740 the title of Knight in the Order of the Golden Fleece, he also became the supreme commander of the army in Hungary. In 1741 he was elected Palatine of Hungary by unanimous vote, before the coronation of the new queen took place. In 1741, during the War of the Austrian Succession, he summoned the Hungarian troops. With the invasion of Bohemia by Frederick I of Prussia in 1744, when he was over eighty years old, he again offered to lead the army, which was rejected by Maria Theresa with a letter of thanks and decorations. Pálffy's special importance to Maria Theresa is shown in the letter she sent him alongside gifts (his own riding horse, a golden sword set with diamonds and a diamond ring).

== Personal life ==
He married twice. His first wife was Countess Teréz Czobor de Czoborszentmihály (1669–1733), whom he married on 4 October 1687. She was the daughter of Count Ádám Czobor de Czoborszentmihály and Borbála "Barbara" Erdődy de Monyorókerék. The couple had three sons and four daughters, including:

- Countess Mária Anna Franziska Pálffy ab Erdõd (1690–1756), who married Count František Karel Přehořovský z Kvasejovic.
- Countess Maria Szidónia Pálffy ab Erdöd (1690–1743), who married Count Ferenc Esterházy de Galántha, a grandson of Count Nikolaus Esterházy de Galántha (a son of Count Ferenc Esterházy and Zsófia Illésházy), who was Palatine of Hungary from 1625 to 1645, and, his second wife, Baroness Krisztina Nyáry de Bedegh.
- Count János Antal Pálffy ab Erdöd (1696–1717), who married Countess Amalia Eleonore Esterházy de Galántha, a daughter of Michael I, 2nd Prince Esterházy of Galántha.
- Count Károly Pál Engelbert Pálffy de Erdõd (1697–1774), who married Josepha von Proskau. After her death in 1748, he married Maria Margaretha von Stubenberg, a daughter of Rudolf von Stubenberg. After her death in 1774, he married Countess Elisabeth Josepha von Starhemberg, a daughter of Count Konrad Sigismund Anton von Starhemberg.
- Count Miklós Pálffy de Erdőd (1699–1734), who married Countess Maria Josepha Philippine von Schlick zu Bassano und Weißkirchen, a daughter of Count Leopold Schlick zu Bassano und Weißkirchen.
- Countess Mária Anna Erzsébet Terézia Emerencia Pálffy de Erdõd (1708–1740), who married Count Lipot "Leopold" Drašković von Trakostyán, a son of Count Ádám Ferenc Draskovich von Trakostjan.

After the death of his first wife, he married Countess Maria Julia von Stubenberg (d. 1756) on 28 August 1741; they had one daughter.

Pálffy died on 24 March 1751 after his health began to decline. His funeral took place with great honours.

Preceded by Stephen Koháry	Judge royal 1731–1741	Succeeded by Joseph Esterházy
Preceded by Adam II. Batthyány	Ban of Croatia; 1704–1732	Succeeded by Ivan V Drašković
Preceded by Miklós IX Pálffy	Palatine of Hungary; 1741–1751	Succeeded by Lajos Batthyány
