= Tahir Pasha Mahmud Bey-zade =

Ottoman governor of Dukakin from 1711 to 1718

Tahir Pasha Mahmud Bey-zade (Turkish: Tahir Paşa Mahmud Bey-zâde, Serbian: Тахир-паша Махмудбеговић; fl. 1711–18) was an Ottoman governor (mutasarrıf), the sanjak-bey of Dukakin (or İpek). In 1711, he and his nephew Ahmed fought at the Moldavian battlefield. In 1717 to 18, he was appointed by the government to deal with the rebellious Serb rayah in the Sanjak of Vučitrn (see Uprising in Vučitrn).
