= Siege of Novi =

Siege of Novi (1717)
- Part of the Austro-Turkish War (1716–1718)
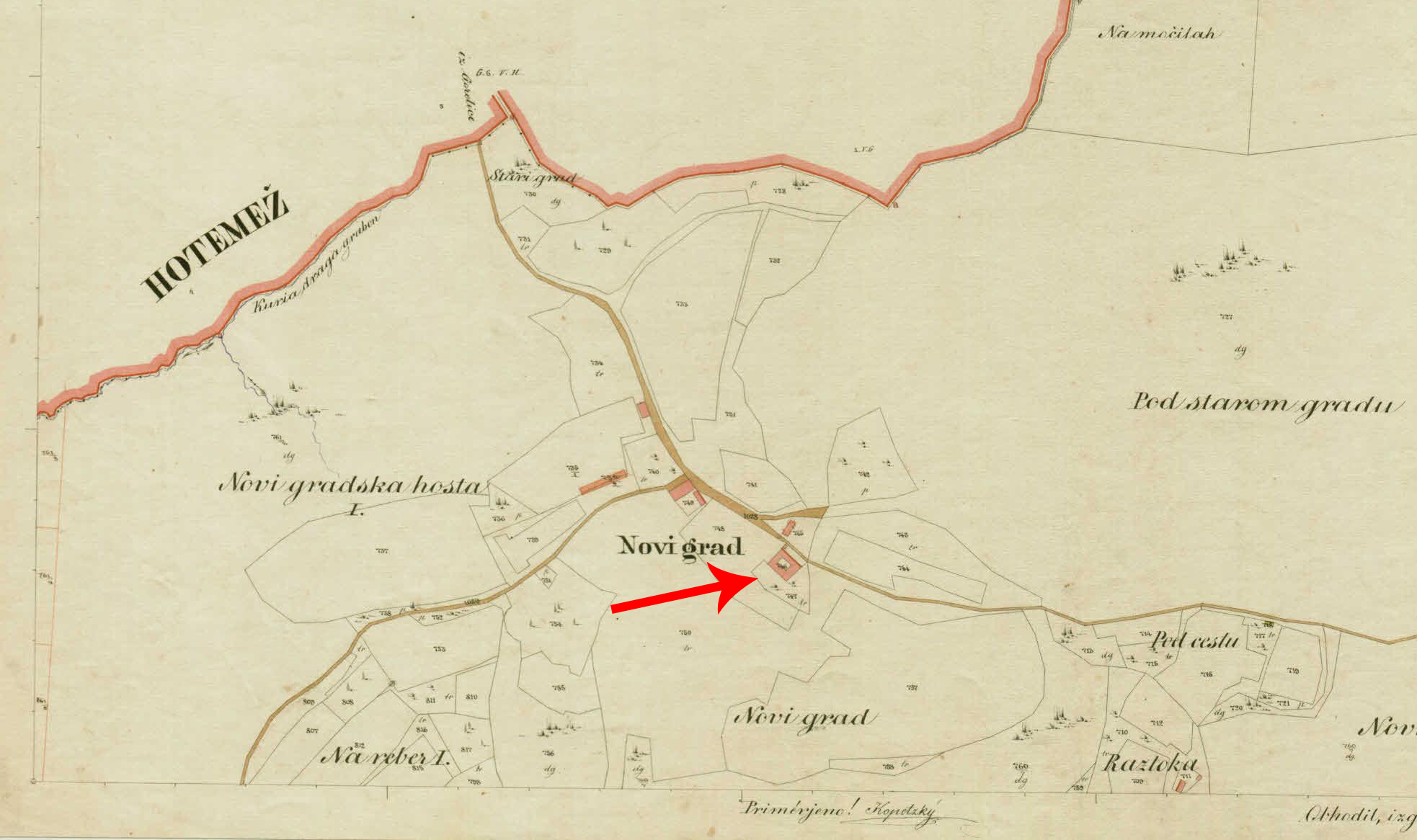
- Map of Novi Grad in 19th century
Date	5 – 19 September 1717
Location	Novi Grad, Bosnia and Herzegovina
Result	Ottoman victory

Belligerents
Habsburg monarchy: Kingdom of Croatia	Ottoman Empire

Commanders and leaders
General Draskovich; General Königsegg	Ali Beg

Strength
3,000 men	700

Casualties and losses
+1,400	Low

The siege of Novi was a military engagement during the Austro-Turkish War (1716–1718). The Austrians besieged Novi Grad held by the Ottomans. The siege ended in fiasco for the Austrians, who suffered heavy losses.

== Background ==
After the capture of Belgrade, Lieutenant General Hannibal Count Heister, who commanded the Austrian forces in Kostajnica, received orders to capture Novi Grad, which he entrusted to Lieutenant General Draskovich and General Königsegg. The two generals commanded a force of 3,000 men, including Croatian troops, and two mortars. Both generals advanced on Novi.

== Siege ==
On September 5, 1717, both generals set up a camp on the Sirovac river on the Una. Their plan was to quickly attack and surround the fortress and bombard the fortress from two sides, and if it did not fall within 2-3 days, it would be taken by storm. However, due to rains of the last few days, the Una and Sana Rivers had swollen and become impassable. Thus forcing the Austrians to remain on the left banks of Una until ships arrived and could not prevent the Ottomans from communicating outside. The Austrians began bombarding the fortress the next day, but due to the poor quality of the ammunition, it had no effect on the walls.

The bombardment continued for several days. On September 11th, when the River calmed, a force of 1,500 men crossed the Una and Sava and finally managed to surround the fortress on the south side. At this time, an Ottoman force of 1,200 men was stationed not far from Prijedor. while other Ottoman detachments were being assembled by the Pasha of Bosnia near Banja Luka five days march away. After besieging on the right bank, the Austrians began preparing for an assault. With a force of 1,000 men and two mortars fired from height, Draskovich planned the assault on the 17th. The attack came and a mine was detonated to enlarge the breach, but it was unsuccessful.

This problem forced the Austrians to postpone the attack, which later ended in abandoning the attack after learning of an upcoming Ottoman force a day march from Novi. The Austrians began removing the guns on the 18th and retreating towards Kostajnica. When the preparations began to take down the guns on the heights, the Ottoman garrison, outnumbered, launched a strong sortie and threw the Austrians into confusion. Königsegg managed to restore order with great difficulty. Some of the artillery units fled from the army.

At midnight, the Austrians began their retreat. The Ottoman relief force led by Ali Beg arrived at Novi on the 18th in a camp that was abandoned by the Imperials. The next morning, a ditch with marshy banks made it difficult to advance. The Ottomans suddenly appeared and attacked; the Austrians were too late to retreat without danger. The border guards established themselves on the height of the left bank on the Una River and were bombarded by the Ottomans with heavy fire. Around midday, the Ottomans were increasing in numbers and were able to surround the right wing where the Croatian troops stationed.

The whole battle ended in confusion and forced the troops to retreat, seeking refuge. Many officers and hundreds of men were killed and captured, and the baggage was taken by the Ottomans. The two generals were almost captured. The Austrian army has suffered more than 1,400 casualties.

== Aftermath ==
The victory at Novi ended the Austrian achievements they acquired in western Bosnia. The Ottomans were once again the masters of the country up to the Sava River. Austria's plans to gain a foothold in Bosnia ended in failure. Prince Eugene of Savoy was very dismayed when he heard the news of the defeat.

== Sources ==
- József Bánlaky: Military history of the Hungarian nation (MEK-OSZK), 0014/1149. The Sava and Bosnian operations.
- Moriz “von” Angeli (1891), Campaigns of Prince Eugene of Savoy (In German).
- Ludwig Matuschka (1900), War against the Turks 1716-18 campaigns 1717-18 (In Italian).
