= Battle of Karlowitz =

1716 Ottoman victory over Austria

Battle of Karlowitz (1716)
- Part of the Austro-Turkish War (1716–1718) and Ottoman–Habsburg wars
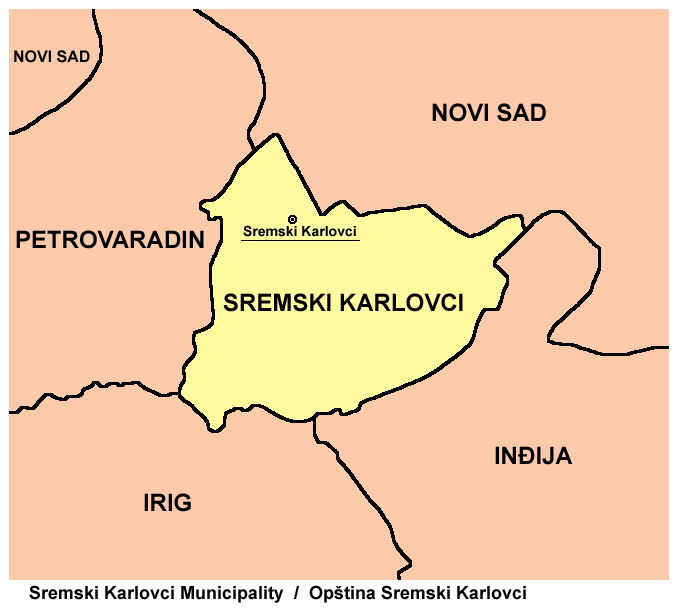
- Map of Karlowitz and Petrovaradin
Date	2 August 1716
Location	Sremski Karlovci, Serbia 45°12′10″N 19°56′01″E
Result	Ottoman victory

Belligerents
Habsburg monarchy	Ottoman Empire

Commanders and leaders
János Pálffy; Gen. Count Hauben (WIA); Lt. Gen. Breuner (POW)	Silahdar Pasha; Kurd Pasha

Strength
3,000 men	10,000 cavalry

Casualties and losses
700 killed or wounded	Unknown

The Battle of Karlowitz was the first military engagement between the Ottomans and the Austrians within the Austro-Turkish War (1716–1718). The battle ended with an Ottoman victory that resulted in the rout of an Austrian reconnaissance force.

== Background ==
At the time when the Austrians decided to join the Venetians in their war against the Ottomans, Prince Eugene of Savoy warned the Ottomans to abide by the Treaty of Karlowitz and return the Venetian lands they took from. Prince Eugene had given the Ottomans a deadline to reply to his message but made no declaration of war. The grand vizier, Silahdar Damat Ali Pasha, wrote to Eugene that he chose war he neither started nor demanded and asserted that it was the Austrians who broke the peace treaty. Eugene left Vienna on June 2, 1716, and reached the village of Futog, west of Petrovaradin. On the 26th and 27th, the Ottomans crossed the Sava River in the direction of Petrovaradin.

== Battle ==
To obtain certain intelligence about the advance and intentions of the Ottoman army, Eugen decided to have some reconnaissance conducted with a bit of ruse. Then General Field Marshal Count Pálffy voluntarily offered to go out with a command of 3,000 men to march to Karlowitz to see what could be done, particularly to gain the heights that had not yet been occupied by the enemy. Prince Eugen approved this with the condition that Pálffy should not engage in any battle. Approaching the Ottoman camp near Karlowitz, just as the two regiments sent to support him joined him, Pálffy suddenly found himself facing a very large cavalry force of 10,000 led by Kurd Pasha.

After four hours of battle, Pálffy decided to retreat. During this, some disorder arose due to the defiles located behind them, and the rear guard had to repeatedly halt and engage the enemy to buy time for the main force to navigate the defiles. However, the disorder was soon managed, and the march continued until they reached the cannons of the fortress of Peterwardein, where they arrived in the evening. The Austrian casualties amounted to 700; among those captured was Lieutenant General Breuner and wounded General Count Hauben. During the course of the battle, Pálffy's horse was shot twice.

== Aftermath ==
The Austrians suffered a tragic but minor defeat. The prince stated that it would have been better if it had not happened. The Ottomans, after their victory, marched towards Petrovaradin, where the grand vizier demanded the surrender of the fortress. Three days later, both sides would meet at the Battle of Petrovaradin, during which the Ottomans suffered a crushing defeat.

== Sources ==
- Kenneth Meyer Setton (1991), Venice, Austria, and the Turks in the Seventeenth Century.
- Friedrich Mühlwerth-Gärtner (1882), Contributions to the history of the Austrian cavalry (In German).
- József Bánlaky: Military history of the Hungarian nation (MEK-OSZK), 0014/1149. The Battle of St. Petersburg on August 5, 1716.
