= Miklós Pálffy =

Hungarian nobleman, Imperial Field marshal and Palatine of Hungary

Count Miklós IX Pálffy de Erdőd
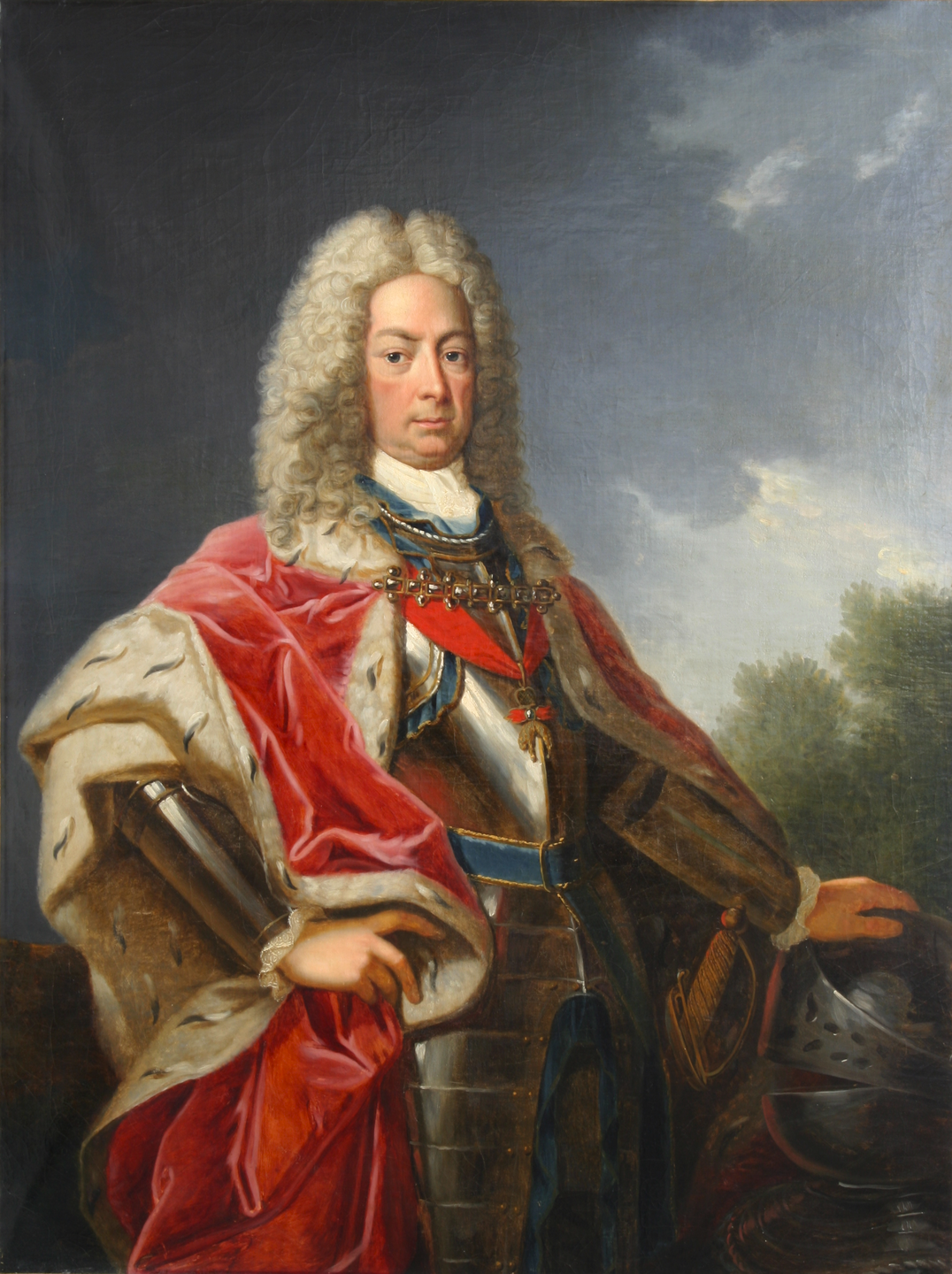

99th Palatine of the Kingdom of Hungary
- In office 14 October 1714 – 20 February 1732
- Monarch: Charles III
- Preceded by: Pál I Esterházy
- Succeeded by: János VI Pálffy

Judge Royal of the Kingdom of Hungary
- In office 6 January 1713 – 14 October 1714
- Monarch: Charles III
- Preceded by: George Erdődy
- Succeeded by: István II Koháry

Personal details
- Born: March 1, 1657 Pozsony, Kingdom of Hungary, Habsburg monarchy (today Bratislava, Slovakia)
- Died: 20 February 1732 (aged 74) Pozsony, Kingdom of Hungary (today Bratislava, Slovakia)
- Spouse: Katalin Weichs
- Children: 7
- Relatives: János Pálffy (brother)
- Noble family: Pálffy ab Erdöd

Military service
- Allegiance: Habsburg monarchy: Kingdom of Hungary
- Branch/service: Army
- Years of service: 1681–1718
- Rank: Generalfeldmarschall
- Battles/wars: Great Turkish War; Siege of Belgrade; Battle of Batočina; Battle of Niš; Battle of Slankamen

Nikolaus VI Graf Pálffy von Erdőd (Hungarian: VI. gróf erdődi Pálffy Miklós) (1 March 1657 – 20 February 1732) was a Hungarian nobleman, Imperial Field marshal and Palatine of Hungary.

== Early life ==
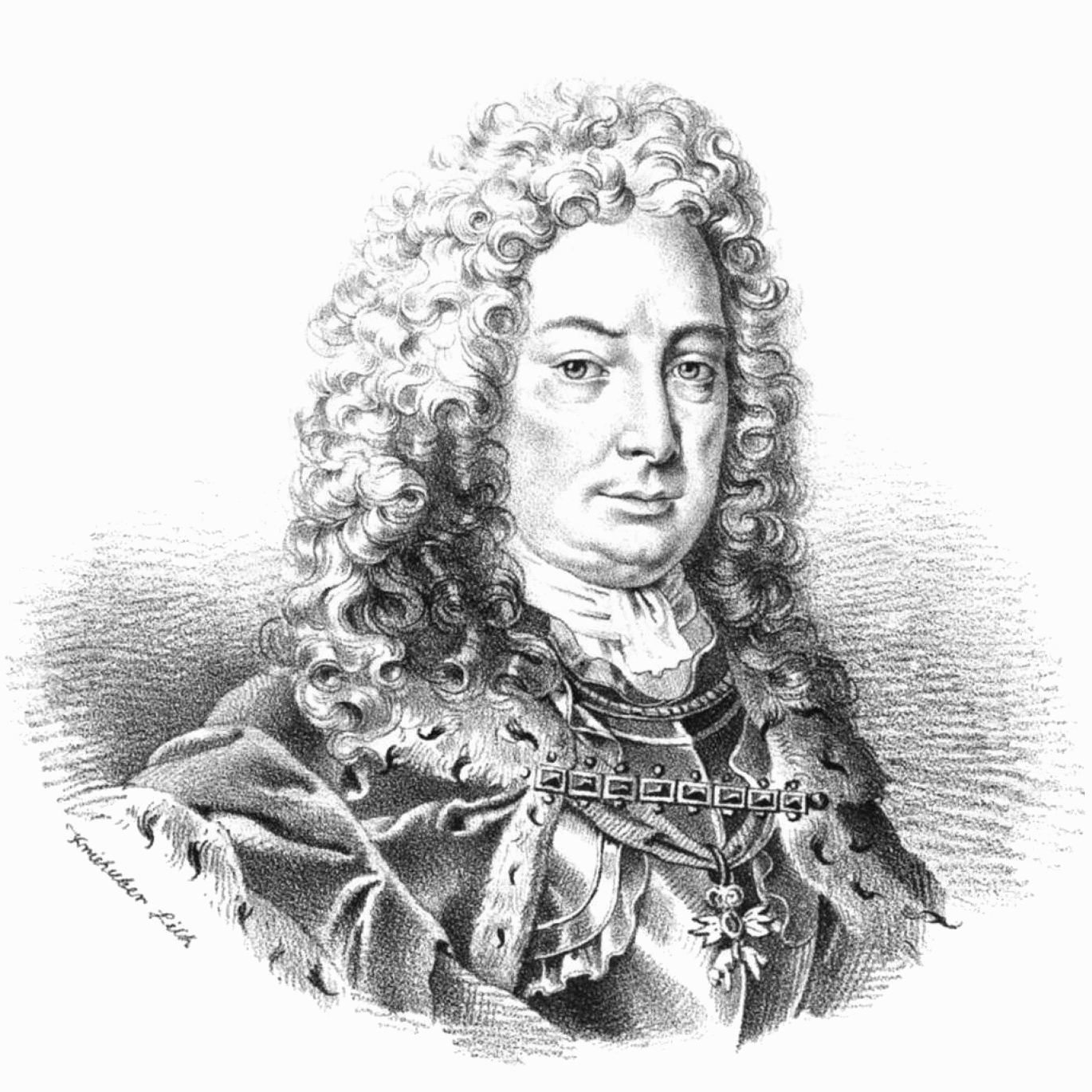
Lithography by Josef Kriehuber (1827)

He was the eldest son of Count Miklós IV Pálffy von Erdőd (1619–1679) and Maria Eleonora von Harrach zu Rohrau und Thannhausen (1634–1693). János Pálffy was his younger brother.

== Career ==
Like his father, he pursued a military career and joined the Habsburg Army. He participated in the Battle of Vienna and the following actions, until he became commander of the Esztergom Fortress in 1687.

In 1688, he participated in the campaign against the Turks under Maximilian II Emanuel, Elector of Bavaria and fought in the Siege of Belgrade (1688), Battle of Batočina, Battle of Niš (1689) and Battle of Slankamen.

As a reward, he became Schlosshauptmann von Pressburg (Captain of Pressburg Castle) in 1694, a Knight of the Order of the Golden Fleece in 1711, Palatine of Hungary in 1713 and Field Marshal General in 1718.

As Palatine of Hungary, he organized the supply of the Army defending Hungary against the Turks. It is also to his credit that the Hungarian and Croat nobility accepted the Pragmatic Sanction so quickly.

He died in Pozsony at the age of nearly 75 years.

== Marriage and Children ==
He married in October 1680 with Baroness Katharina Elisabeth von und zu Weichs (died 1724) and had :

- Lipót I József Ignác Kálmán (1681–1720), Austrian General and father of Miklós Pálffy, the Hungarian Court Chancellor.
- Mária Erzsébet Filippina Borbála, (1681–1732), married Count Karl Cajetan de Longueval of Bocquoy
- Eleonóra Mária Teréz Bonaventura, (1682–1729), married Franz Anton von Abensberg und Traun
- János VI József Antal Prosper (1685–1716), killed in action at the Battle of Petrovaradin
- Ferenc III Rudolf Lõrinc (1686–1735)
- Károly II József Miklós Rochus (1687–1720)
- Ferenc IV Henrik Antal (1688–1689)
- Karolina Anna Dorottya (1689–1759), married Count Karl Ludwig von Roggendorf
- Ferdinánd II Vilmos Zsigmond, (1690–1694)
- Lajos I, (1692–1693)
- Mária Anna Ernesztina Karolina (1693–1761), married Count Joseph Johann Franz Anton Ungnad von Weissenwolf
