= Pera Segedinac =

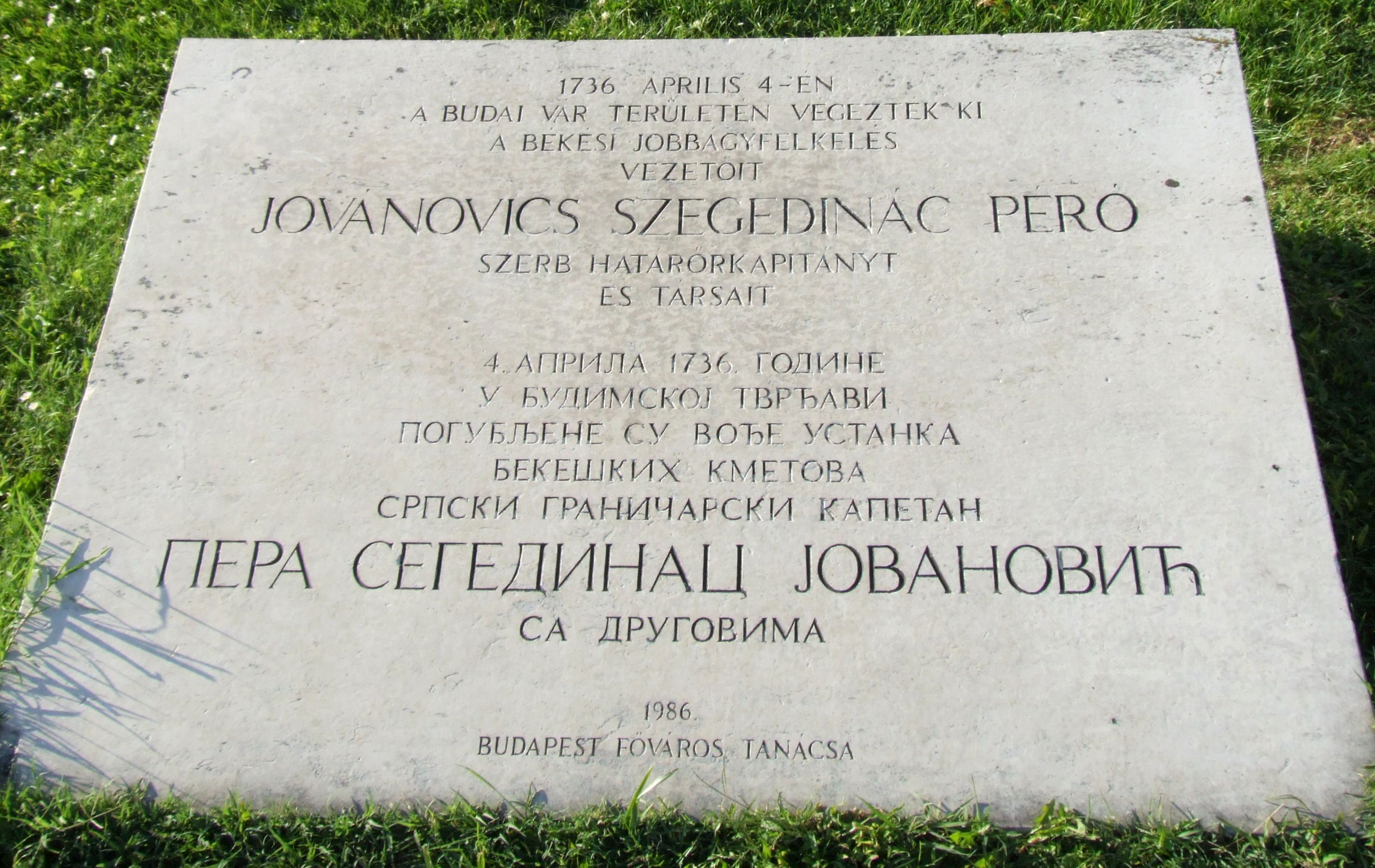
Memorial.

Petar Jovanović (Serbian: Петар Јовановић, 1655 – 4 April 1736), known as Pera Segedinac (Serbian: Пера Сегединац) was a Habsburg Serb military officer, a captain in Pomorišje. He led a Serb revolt in 1735.

Born in Pecica 1655 then part of Ottoman Empire, what is known about him is that he was a retired officer in the Serbian Militia stationed at Szeged, hence the name "Segedinac". At the age of 80, Segedinac joined forces with Hungarian peasants revolting against conditions in Bekes, Csongrád and Zarand counties in 1735. After the revolt, Segedinac and several Hungarian rebels were captured, tortured, and executed in Buda the following year.

== Literature ==
Laza Kostić (1841–1910) wrote the play Pera Segedinac in 1875.

== See also ==
- Jovan Monasterlija
- Pavle Nestorović
- Antonije Znorić
- Subota Jović

== Sources ==
- Vuk Vinaver (1955). Pera Segedinac. Prosveta.
- Laza Kostić (1950) [1920]. Pera Segedinac: tragedija u 5 činova, devet slika. Savez kulturno-prosvetnih društava NR Srbije.
