= Jovan Monasterlija =

Serbian army officer (1683–1706)

Jovan Monasterlija Јован Монастерлија
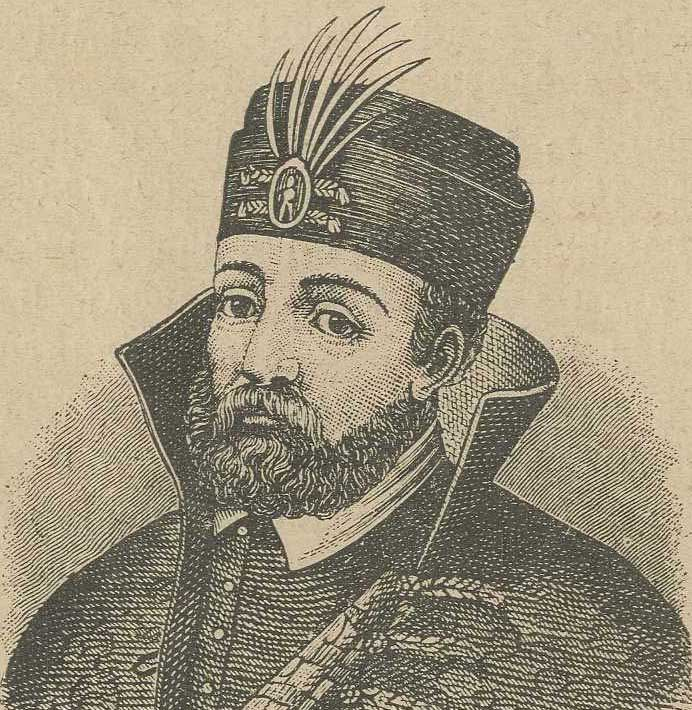
- Jovan Monasterlija portrait
- Born: 1660s Komorn, Habsburg monarchy (modern Slovakia)
- Died: 1706; Großwardein, Habsburg monarchy (modern Romania)
- Military career
- Allegiance: Holy Roman Empire (Leopold I)
- Service years: fl. 1683–1706
- Rank: Vice-voivode (podvojvoda); General
- Unit: Serbian Militia
- Conflicts: Siege of Belgrade (1688); Battle of Zenta (1697)

Jovan Monasterlija (Serbian Cyrillic: Јован Монастерлија; (Note: His Serbian name is Jovan Monasterlija, other variations are Manastirlija, while in German; Johann Monasterli. His father was Petar, hence, according to the contemporary naming culture, his name was Jovan Petrović.) fl. 1683–1706) was a Serbian vice-voivode (podvojvoda) and Austrian (Holy Roman Empire) imperial officer that led a Serbian Militia against the Ottoman Empire and other enemies of the Austrian Emperor. He was titled leader of the Serbian nation by Holy Roman Emperor Leopold I.

== Early life ==
Fleeing from Ottoman repression they moved to Srpski Kovin (Ráckeve) in 16th century. They came from Monastir (Bitola), hence his epithet "Monasterlija" (Turkish: Monastirli, of Monastir). To avoid Ottoman repression after the Long Turkish War the family had settled Komárom County in 1606, together with other Serbs from Kovin.

The Monasterlija (or Manastirlija) family gained nobility status from Emperor Ferdinand III in 1665, when Petar Monasterlija was ennobled. Jovan, the son of Petar, was born in Komárno. Jovan married a young woman Ana from a Serbian noble family Rašković.

== Career ==
=== 1688–92 ===
Maximilian II Emanuel, Elector of Bavaria, led the capture of Belgrade in 1688 from the Ottomans, with the full support of Serbian insurgents under the command of Monasterlija. Between 1689 and 1692, central parts of present-day Serbia were controlled by the Habsburg crown. In 1689 Monasterlija was sent to defend Golubac.

In 1689 Louis William was appointed as chief commander of the Imperial army in its invasion of the territory of present-day Serbia. Before the invasion Louis William recruited Serb rebels all over territory of present-day Serbia, whose infantry units were called hayduks while cavalry units of Serb rebels were called Serb husars. On August 29, 1689 Serbian Militia under the command of Pavle Nestorović Deak as a vanguard unit of the Habsburg army were victorious against a vanguard unit of the Ottoman army during the Battle of Batočina.

Jovan Monasterlija, who was appointed as captain of Serbian Militia in 1690, recruited Serbs into his units in the summer of 1690 on the southern border of the Austrian Empire. The Austrian retreat from Kosovo prompted the Great Migration of the Serbs, under the leadership of Serbian Patriarch Arsenije III. On 11 April 1691, he was appointed the commander of the Serbian Militia (which came to be known as "Monasterlija's Serbs"), after Serbs demanded their own leaders while going to battle. His command was of more than 10,000 volunteer Serb soldiers, and was to be under the direct supervision of the Aulic War Council. The Serbian soldiers were highly regarded by Leopold. During the Battle of Slankamen on August 19, 1691, Serbian Militia with 10,000 Serbs under the command of Jovan Monasterlija participated in the important victory over Ottoman forces. When Austrian forces supported by Serbian Militia captured Oradea from Ottomans in the spring of 1692, the seat of the Serbian Militia's headquarter became Baja.

=== 1692–99 ===
The Austrian Empire had intentions to reduce the power and importance of Serbian Militia and its military and religious leaders by dividing it to smaller units and sending them to different distant parts of the Empire. Monasterlija's rank was changed from Serbian vice-voivode and Chief of the Serbian Nation to Rascian obercaptain. Because of the constant Ottoman threat such plans were never fully implemented.

He commanded forces during the battle of Senta (11 September 1697). After the wars he gained overlordship of the Petrovaradin fortress, and was appointed to overlook the building of a pontoon bridge over the Danube. He retired after the Treaty of Karlowitz in 1699 and was given land by Leopold.

=== 1703–06 ===
He was nevertheless sent to fight off the uprising of Francis II Rákóczi against the Habsburgs in 1703. He succeeded and was given the title of general. Leopold, just before his death, gave Jovan the task of integrating the Serb units into the regular Austrian army. He died from wounds sustained during the siege of Oradea. He died in 1706 and was buried in Šišatovac, where his tomb lays, with the coat of arms of the family.

== Aftermath ==
Monasterlija was the only Vice-Voivode; his successor, captain Mojsije Rašković was appointed "Oberst der serbischen National-Miliz" on July 8, 1707.

== Ranks ==
- "Rascian obercapitain" (after 1692)
- "Anführer und Commandant der serbischen National-Miliz"
- Vice-General or Vice-Voivode or Vice-Governor of Serbs (de. Vice-Wojwode, sr. podvojvoda or nadvojvoda), in 1691
- Captain, in 1690

== Family ==
He was married to Ana Rašković, a member of the Rašković family.

== Legacy ==
Jovan contributed to the Fruška Gora monasteries.

== See also ==
- Leopold I, Holy Roman Emperor
- Enea Silvio Piccolomini (general)
- Prince Eugene of Savoy
- Louis William, Margrave of Baden-Baden
- Đorđe Branković
- Antonije Znorić, a military commander of Serbian Militia
- Jovan Tekelija
- Pavle Nestorović Deak
- Subota Jović
- Pera Segedinac
