= Battle of Slankamen =

Battle that occurred during the Great Turkish War

- Part of Great Turkish War
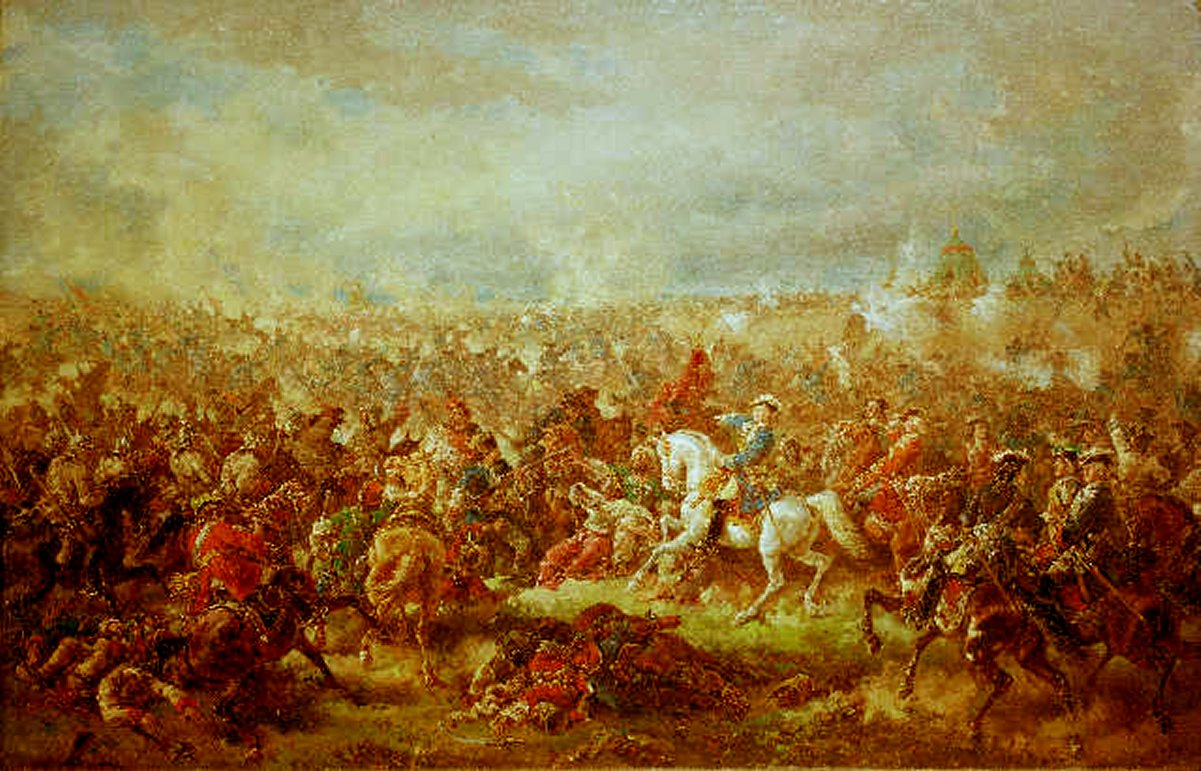
- Battle of Slankamen by Friedrich Kaiser
Date	19 August 1691
Location	Slankamen (40 miles north of Belgrade), Sanjak of Syrmia, Ottoman Empire (before Ottoman invasion part of Hungary, today Serbia) 45°08′23.64″N 20°15′35.64″E
Result	Imperial victory; Imperial conquest of most of Croatia

Belligerents
Holy Roman Empire; (Habsburg monarchy) Habsburg Croatia; (Habsburg monarchy) Serbian Militia	Ottoman Empire; Kuruc rebels

Commanders and leaders
(Holy Roman Empire) Ludwig Wilhelm (Habsburg monarchy) Adam Zrinski † (Holy Roman Empire) Jovan Monasterlija	Mustafa Köprülü †; Emeric Thököly

Strength
20,000–33,000 men; 90 guns	50,000 men; 158 guns

Casualties and losses
7,300	25,000

The Battle of Slankamen was fought on 19 August 1691, near Slankamen in the Ottoman Sanjak of Syrmia (modern-day Vojvodina, Serbia), between the Ottoman Empire, and Habsburg Austrian forces during the Great Turkish War.

The battle saw a Turkish-Transylvanian force led by Emeric Thököly and Mustafa Köprülü suffer an overwhelming defeat by an Imperial army commanded by Ludwig Wilhelm of Baden. The Grand Vizir Mustafa Köprülü was killed by a stray bullet and the Ottoman army routed, leaving behind the war chest and their artillery. The battle was disastrous for the Turks and costly for the Austrians. The victory stabilized the Hungarian front and secured Hungary, Croatia and Transylvania for the Habsburgs.

== Background ==
The Ottomans suffered a series of defeats against the Austrians in the 1680s, most notably at the Battle of Vienna in 1683, Buda in 1686, Belgrade in 1688 and Bosnia in 1689. However, with the beginning of the Nine Years War in the west, the early 1690s were to see an end to Habsburg conquests in the Balkans and a partial Ottoman recovery. Many German troops were withdrawn to fight King Louis XIV's French forces on the Rhine, encouraging the Ottomans, led by the Grand Vizier Köprülü Fazıl Mustafa Pasha, to counterattack.

In April 1690 the death of Michael I Apafi In April 1690 pushed the Sultan to nominate Hungarian Emeric Thököly prince of Transylvania, Thököly at the head of an army quickly occupied much of the principality. When the Imperial army left Belgrade to defeat Thököly in September, Köprülü managed to retake Belgrade, which the Ottomans had lost in 1688.

In August 1691, Ludwig Wilhelm (Türkenlouis) marched down the Danube to provoke the Ottomans into another major battle, after gathering a new Imperial army of 33,000, including a 10,000 strong Serb militia, under the command of vice-voivoda Jovan Monasterlija.

== Battle ==
The clash between the two forces took place on the west side of the Danube, opposite the outlet of the Tisa. Both armies deployed near Zemun, but the superior Ottoman army did not attack for two days, the Ottomans lacked the vital Tartar component of their army, which was still travelling south. By withdrawing slowly to a fortified position near Slankamen Ludwig Wilhelm tried to provoke the attack. The Ottomans followed and surrounded the Imperial Army. By 19 August, heat, disease and desertion had reduced both armies to 33,000 and 50,000 able men. On that day the Ottoman cavalry finally attacked.

These were unorganized charges, however; although huge, the Ottoman forces were poorly armed and no match for the firepower of Ludwig Wilhelm's German-Austrian infantry and field guns. Additionally, the Ottoman supply system was incapable of waging a long war on the empty expanses of the Pannonian plain.

Initially, the Ottomans were at an advantage, as they advanced and burned 800 supply wagons of the Imperial Army. Ludwig Wilhelm, in a desperate situation, broke out of his position, besieged by the Ottomans, and turned their flanks with his cavalry, inflicting fearful carnage. After a hard battle, the 33,000-man Imperial Army was victorious over the larger Ottoman force. The death of Grand Vizier Köprülü Fazıl Mustafa Pasha during mid-battle caused the Ottoman morale to drop and the army to disperse and retreat.

== Aftermath ==
The Battle of Slankamen was the last battle in the war that could have brought it back in Ottomans' favour. The Austrians took Transylvania but were not able to press their advantage as they had gotten involved with France in the war of the Grand Alliance. The Ottoman defeat, followed by the equally disastrous Battle of Zenta, eventually lead to the Treaty of Karlowitz in 1699. For his victories against the Turks Ludwig Wilhelm of Baden earned the nickname Türkenlouis ("Turkish Louis").

== Legacy ==
A 16-metre-tall obelisk (52 ft) was built in Slankamen to commemorate the victory of the Imperial Army.

== Images ==
Commemorative Medallion
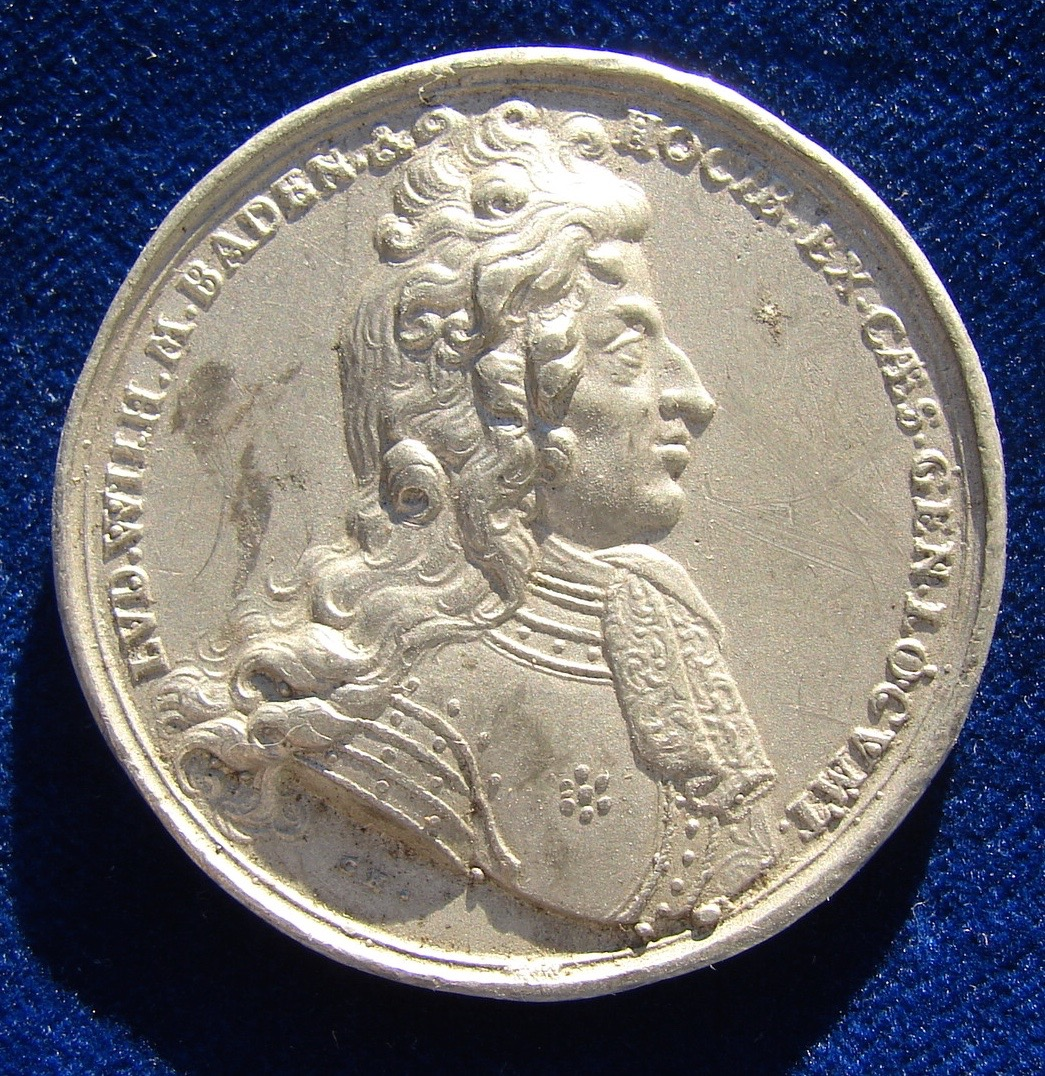
A Medallion by Georg Hautsch celebrating the Habsburg victory at Slankamen, portrait of Turk Louis 1691, obverse.

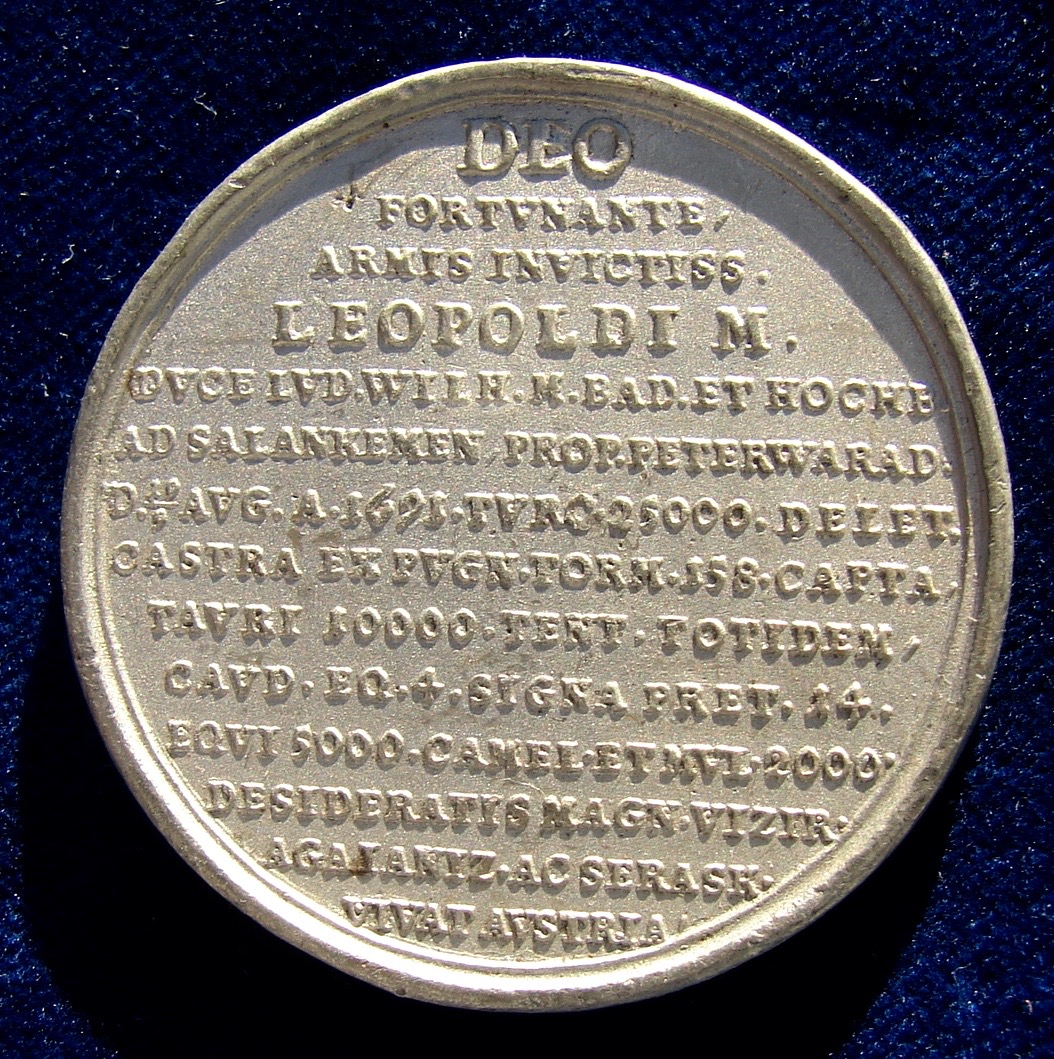
reverse of the medal
