= Jovan Tekelija =

Serb military commander in the Habsburg Monarchy

Jovan Popović Tekelija
- Јован Поповић Текелија
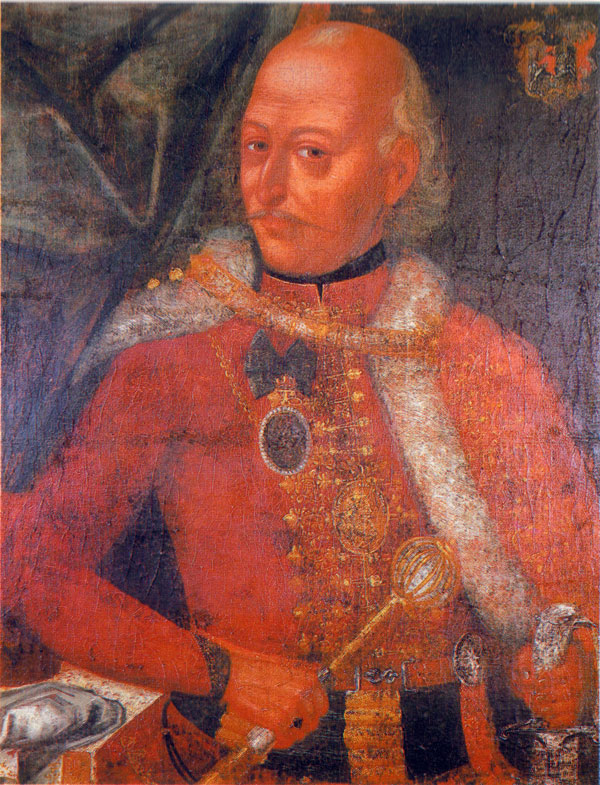
- Jovan Tekelija, first half of the 18th century
- Born: c. 1660; Arad, Ottoman Empire (modern-day Romania)
- Died: c. 1721–1722; Arad, Habsburg monarchy
- Relatives: Sava Tekelija
- Military career
- Allegiance: Habsburg monarchy
- Rank: Oberstcaptain; Captain (1689 – ?); Oberst (? – 1722)
- Unit: Serbian Militia
- Commands: 1697 - Captain of Senta; 1698 - Captain of Arad
- Conflicts: Battle of Buda (1686); Battle of Zenta; Rákóczi's War of Independence; Battle of Zsibó
- Awards: Ennobled by Emperor Joseph I (1706)

Jovan Popović Tekelija (Serbian Cyrillic: Јован Поповић Текелија; c. 1660 – c. 1721–1722) was a Serb army officer serving in the Habsburg army. As commander of the Serbian Militia, Tekelija participated in many battles distinguishing himself in particular during the Battle of Zenta in 1697 where the Ottoman Empire suffered a stunning defeat. For his merit, he was appointed Colonel of the Serbian militia in Arad and ennobled by Emperor Joseph I.

== Family ==
Jovan Popović Tekelija was born in Arad or in Csanád as the first known member of the notable Serb family Popović Tekelija.

== Military career ==
At an early age Tekelija joined the Austrian military. After Austrian capture of Belgrade in 1689 he was promoted to the rank of captain with special position as pathfinder of the Austrian army in Voivodina and its neighbouring territories. He fought against Kuruc rebels before being asked to join the fight against the Turks. In 1686 Tekelija fought at the Battle of Buda.

Tekelija played a particularly important role in the Battle of Zenta held in 1697, one of the most decisive battles of the Ottoman-Habsburg war that had brought the Turks to the gates of Vienna. Before the battle Tekelija held the position of Captain of Senta. On 11 September Tekelija broke through to the war council held in Bečej and informed Prince Eugene of Savoy, whose forces were in Szenttamás and Bečej, that the Ottomans were preparing to cross the Tisa river and leave Bačka. Prince Eugene then asked Tekelija to lead the imperial army through the swamps and marsh to the rear of the Turks encampment as night was falling. Half of the Ottoman army was on the opposite bank and the surprise was total, 30,000 Ottomans soldiers died, including the Grand Vizier.

As a reward for the part he played during the battle, Tekelija was promoted to the rank of Captain of the Serbian Militia in Arad in 1698. Following the decree of the Viennese court promoting him, Tekelija had a castle built, around which the city developed. In 1706 he was ennobled by Emperor Joseph I. In 1710 Colonels Tekelija and Vulin Potisac sent Captain Bogdan Popović to negotiate with Russia about cooperation between Serbs and Russia in war against the Ottoman Empire.

Tekelija died in 1721 or in 1722. He was succeeded Captain of the Serbian Militia by Đurka Šević, the father of Jovan Šević.

== Arms ==
Coat of arms of Jovan Tekelija
Notes Coat of arms of the Popović Tekelija family Adopted 1706

== See also ==
- Serbian Militia
- Jovan Šević
- Antonije Znorić
- Pavle Nestorović
- Jovan Monasterlija
- Subota Jović

== Sources ==
- Matica Srpska (Novi Sad, Serbia) (2003). Anthology of Matica Srpska for history (in Serbian). Matica.
- Vojska (in Serbian). Vojnoizdavački i novinski centar. 1993.
- Popović, Dušan J. (1990). Srbi u Vojvodini (in Serbian). Matica srpska. ISBN 9788636301753.
- Cerović, Ljubivoje (2002). Srbi u Ukrajini (in Serbian). Muzej Vojvodine. ISBN 9788682077169.
- Gavrilović, Slavko (1993). Iz istorije Srba u Hrvatskoj, Slavoniji i Ugarskoj: XV-XIX vek (in Serbian). Filip Višnjić. ISBN 9788673631264.
- Samardžić, R.; Duškov, M. (1993). The Serbs in European Civilization. Balkanološki Institut Beograd: Posebna izdanja. Nova. ISBN 978-86-7583-015-3.
- Bogoslovski glasnik (in Serbian). 1902.
- Istorijski institut u Beogradu (1963). Istorijski časopis (in Serbian). Institut.
