= Antonije Znorić =

- Born: beginning of the 17th century Habsburg monarchy
- Died: September 21, 1695; Lugoj, Ottoman Empire
- Military career
- Allegiance: Habsburg monarchy
- Rank: captain (kapetan), colonel (potpukovnik), obor-kapetan, oberstleutnant
- Unit: Serbian Militia
- Conflicts: Battle of Lugos

Antonije Znorić (Serbian Cyrillic: Антоније Знорић; fl. 1689 – September 21, 1695) was a military officer (colonel) of the Habsburg army and the commander of the Serbian Militia during the Great Turkish War.

== Early life ==
He was born in Vnorovy, Habsburg monarchy, at the beginning of the 17th century. He had a brother, Strahinja.

== Great Turkish War ==
=== Background ===
During the Great Turkish War Serbs gave big support to Austrian side. The Ottoman Empire had suffered partial military collapse against the Austrians in the 1680s, most notably at the Battle of Vienna in 1683, and the loss of Belgrade to Maximilian II of Bavaria in 1688 and Bosnia in 1689. However, with the beginning of the Nine Years War in the west, the early 1690s were to see an end to Habsburg conquests in the Balkans and a partial Ottoman recovery. Despite the Ottoman recovery and weakening of the Habsburg military presence on the Danube (most Habsburg soldiers were sent to fight against the France in the War of the Grand Alliance) Habsburg supreme command planned offensive activities against Ottomans, heavily relying on the Serb soldiers of Serbian Militia and Serbian rebels on the Balkans. In 1689 Louis William was appointed as chief commander of the Imperial army in its invasion of Serbia. Before the invasion Louis William recruited Serb rebels all over Serbia, whose infantry units were called hayduks while cavalry units of Serb rebels were called Serb hussars.

=== Invasion of Serbia (1689–1690) ===
On September 24, 1689, the Austrian army captured Niš after defeating the Ottomans at the Battle of Niš. Following the plan of their supreme command, Austrian army was then split on two parts. One part under command of Louis William headed toward Vidin, while remaining part of 3,700 soldiers under command of general Piccolomini went from Niš via Prokuplje to Kosovo Vilayet in the middle of October 1689. Major part of his soldiers were members of Serbian Militia under command of Antonije Znorić.

Ottoman forces defeated Habsburg army in the region of Dragoman on October 29 and headed toward Prizren. The whole Habsburg garrison, consisting of Piccolomini's regiment and 2,500 Serbs of Serbian Militia under the command of Antonije Znorić, retreated before the Ottoman troops reached Prizren. Znorić and his Serbian Militia first retreated to Belgrade and then came back to Niš following Piccolini's order. During his retreat Znorić burned down Prokuplje.

On January 23, 1690, Znorić won the battle against the Ottoman unit of around 3,000 men, and on March 15 he attacked Peć. After he returned from Peć to Niška Banja Znorić won the battle against Ottoman units in Pernik near Sofia on March 20, and returned to Pirot with spoils of war.

=== Banat (1690–1695) ===
After Austrian troops retreated from Serbia to Banat in 1690, Znorić was appointed for the commander of Caransebeş, which became his place of residence, with Serbian Militia still under his direct command.

Friedrich von Veterani recommended Znorić for promotion and salary increase on August 28, 1691.

At the beginning of September 1691 Znorić won the battle against an Ottoman company in the area of Danube's Iron Gate and another one in the area of Caransebeş in November 1691.

In spring 1694 Serbs were successfully mobilized and cavalry unit of 2,000 Serbs was put under the command of Antonije Znorić, who was promoted to the rank of lieutenant colonel (Oberstleutnant) on May 11, 1694. At the beginning of July 1694 Znorić and his unit invaded territory of the Ottoman Empire (today part of Serbia) and destroyed a bridge on the river Morava, robbed five Ottoman ships which sailed on Danube loaded with army supplies and sank two Ottoman ships. Austrian War Council sent instructions to Znorić for his further combat activities on July 31, and he complained that he had only 1,000 soldiers left after some of his men deserted him because they have not received their salaries. After Znorić's complaint War Council paid overdue salaries to Serb soldiers.

Znorić was killed in the battle against the Ottomans near Lugoj on September 21, 1695. Despite the heroism displayed by Znorić, Captain Strahinja and their men during the battle, they were unable to overcome the onslaught of the numerically superior Turkish Army. He was commander of the units of Serbian Militia within the Austrian army that day.

== Commanders ==
- Jovan Monasterlija
- Pavle Nestorović Deak
- Subota Jović
- Vuk Isaković
- Jovan Tekelija

== See also ==
- Serbian Militia
