= Subota Jović =

- Субота Јовић
- Born: 17th century
- Military career
- Allegiance: Holy Roman Empire
- Rank: Captain
- Commands: Captain of Arad
- Conflicts: Battle of Arad

Subota Jović (fl. 1691) was late 17th century Habsburg military officer of Serbian origin.

In September 1691 units of Serbian Militia from Transylvania commanded by Subota Jović captured Arad. Because Subota Jović distinguished himself during this capture, field marshal Friedrich von Veterani appointed him as Captain of Arad.

== See also ==
- Antonije Znorić
- Pavle Nestorović Deak
- Jovan Monasterlija Komoranac
- Pera Segedinac
- Vuk Isaković
- Jovan Tekelija
- Novak Petrović
- Pane Božić
- Stefan Prodan Šteta
- Captain Strahinja

== Sources ==
- Popović, Dušan J. (1954). Velika seoba srba 1690: srbi seljaci i plemići. Srpska književna zadruga.
- Tutorov, Milan (1995). Seva munja biće opet buna: istorika Zrenjanina i Banata. Gradska narod. biblioteka Žarko Zrenjanin. ISBN 9788680051505.
- Cerović, Ljubivoje; Stepanov, Ljubomir (2000). Srbi u Rumuniji. Savez Srba u Rumuniji. ISBN 9789739965712.
