= Pavle Nestorović =

- Павле Несторовић
- Military career
- Allegiance: Holy Roman Empire
- Nickname: Deak
- Commands: Captain of Serbian Regiment 1688; Captain of Smederevo 1688-89; Captain of Serbian Militia 1689; Lieutenant of Serbian Militia 1689-1699; Oberstarzt of Titel 1699
- Conflicts: Battle of Batočina; Battle of Niš

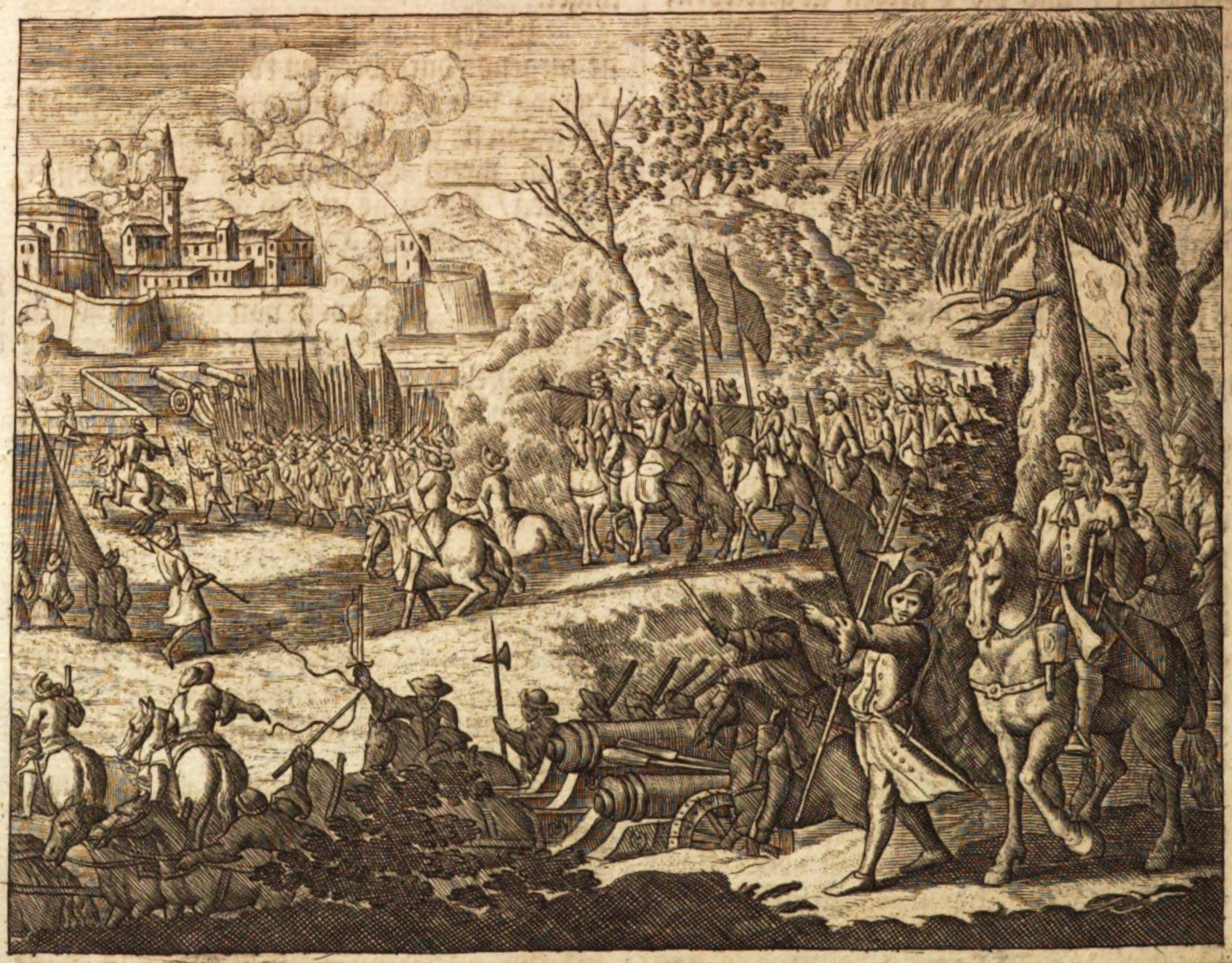
Nestorović commanded the Serbian army at the Battle of Niš (pictured)

Pavle Nestorović (Serbian Cyrillic: Павле Несторовић), known as Dejak (Дејак) or Deak (Деак), was an Archduchy of Austria military officer of Serbian ethnicity. He was most notable as commander of the Serbian Militia during the Great Turkish War.

== Biography ==
The Slavic language word deak (English: student) was used by Hungarians to denote those who studied at schools with Latin-script textbooks. Pavle Nestorović was among them.

The Ottomans captured Nestorović and handed him over to their vassal Imre Thököly, who put him in prison in Veliki Varadin (modern-day Oradea in Romania). He was ransomed in June 1688.

In 1688, after the successful siege of Belgrade, Nestorović was appointed as commander of Smederevo with the rank of captain. He had under his command 400 Austrian musketeers and 600 Serbs. He was then appointed as commander of the Serbian Militia.

Count Đorđe Branković had no military experience and tried to engage Nestorović to command units of Serbs he would mobilize to join the Army of the Holy Roman Empire. Branković may have had the intention to marry Nestorović's sister to establish closer ties with him.

From the beginning of 1689, according to instructions from Vienna, Nestorović organized anti-Ottoman uprisings of Serbs in the sanjak of Smederovo. He was strongly disappointed because the rebels were not immediately supported by the Habsburg imperial army. The rebels left their homes and fieldwork expecting a quick advance by the army; which, however, continued its invasion into Ottoman Serbia only in July 1689.

On 29 August 1689 the Serbian Militia under the command of Dejak as a vanguard unit of the Habsburg army were victorious against a vanguard unit of the Ottoman army during the Battle of Batočina.

On 24 September 1689, the Habsburg army captured Niš after defeating the Ottomans at the Battle of Niš. Nestorović and the Serbian unit under his command participated in this battle. When Louis William learned that there were no Ottoman defensive positions on Vinik, he ordered Nestorović to attack it. Nestorović managed to bypass the right wing of the Ottoman forces and with this maneuver won the battle. For this achievement, Nestorović was promoted to the rank of lieutenant. On 4 October 1689 Nestorović was appointed as commander of all units of Serbian Militia in Serbia.

Following the plan of the supreme command, the army was then split into two parts. One part under command of Louis William headed toward Vidin, while the remaining part of 3,700 soldiers, under the command of general Piccolomini, went from Niš via Prokuplje to Kosovo Vilayet in the middle of October 1689. The bulk of his soldiers were 3,400 members of the Serbian Militia under the command of Antonije Znorić who was appointed as assistant of Nestorović.

In 1695 Nestorović attacked Ottoman-held Temišvar, but without success. In 1697 Nestorović successfully fought against Imre Thököly near Tokaj.

In 1699, after the Treaty of Karlovac, the Serb regiment under command of Nestorović was disbanded and he was appointed as Oberstarzt (English: Lieutenant) of Titel.

== Commanders ==
- Antonije Znorić
- Jovan Monasterlija Komoranac
- Subota Jović
- Pera Segedinac
- Novak Petrović
- Pane Božić
- Stefan Prodan Šteta

== See also ==
- Serbian Militia
- Serbian Revolution
- Military Frontier

== Sources ==
- Zhivot (1971). Macedonian Review. Kulturen Zhivot.
- Popović, Dušan J. (1990). Srbi u Vojvodini. Matica srpska. ISBN 9788636301753.
- Maletić, Mihailo (1968). Vojvodina: Znamenitosti i lepote. Književne novine.
- Pajić, Tomislav (1973). Bor i okolina: prošlost i tradicionalna kultura. Skupština opštine.
- Muzej (1968). Annuaire de la ville de Beograd. Izd. Muzej grada Beograda.
- Cerović, Ljubivoje; Stepanov, Ljubomir (2000). Srbi u Rumuniji. Savez Srba u Rumuniji. ISBN 9789739965712.
- umetnosti, Srpska akademija nauka i (1911). Posebna izdanja.
- Зборник (1992). Зборник Матице српске за историју. Матица.
- Andrić, Ljubisav (1991). Seoba u sporovima. Književna zajednica Novog Sada. ISBN 9788673312286.
- Mirčetić, Dragoljub (1994). Vojna istorija Niša: deo 1. Od najstarijih vremena do prvog srpskog ustanka. deo 2. U sredjem veku (700-1459). deo 3. U razdoblju Turske vlasti (1459-1878). Prosveta. ISBN 9788774551522.
- Radonić, Jovan (1911). Grof Đorđe Branković, izabrani despot srpski u Budimu. Matica srpska.
- Вукићевић, Даница; Ћирковић, Симо Ц (2006). Српска породична енциклопедија. Народна кјнига. ISBN 9788633127332.
- Gavrilović, Slavko (1993). Iz istorije Srba u Hrvatskoj, Slavoniji i Ugarskoj: XV-XIX vek. Filip Višnjić. ISBN 9788673631264.
- Kolundžija, Zoran (2008). Vojvodina: Od najstarijih vremena do velike seobe. Prometej. ISBN 9788651503064.
