= Battle of Zenta =

1697 battle of the Great Turkish War

- Part of the Great Turkish War
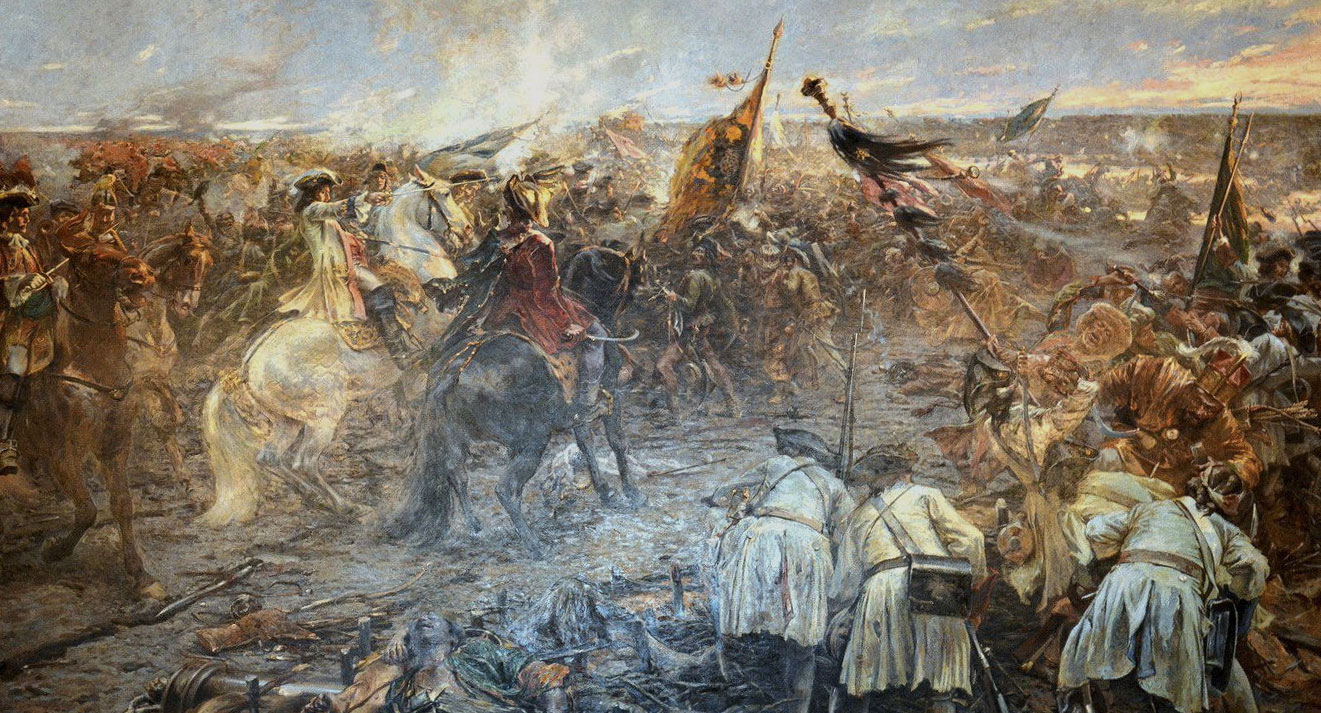
- Battle of Zenta, 11 September 1697; Franz Eisenhut, 1896
Date	11 September 1697
Location	Near Zenta, Kingdom of Hungary, occupied by the Ottoman Empire; Present-day Senta, Vojvodina, Serbia; 45°55′34″N 20°05′53″E
Result	Holy League victory

Belligerents
Habsburg Monarchy; Kingdom of Hungary; Serbian Militia	Ottoman Empire; Crimean Tatars; Kuruc rebels

Commanders and leaders
Prince Eugene of Savoy; Guido Starhemberg; Sigbert Heister; Charles-Thomas de Vaudémont; Jovan Popović Tekelija	Mustafa II; Elmas Mehmed Pasha †; Emeric Thököly

Strength
50,000 men (Note: 34,000 infantry and 16,000 cavalry): 34,000 infantry; 16,000 cavalry; 60 guns	50,000–100,000 men (Note: As reported by Caroline Finkel, Ottoman historian Mehmed Ağa distrusted the Grand Vizier and accused him of exaggerating the army size to mislead the Sultan. Ağa claimed the actual numbers had been closer to 50,000 in the two previous years.); 200 guns

Casualties and losses
429 killed (Note: Includes 28 officers and 401 soldiers; wounded: 133 officers and 1,435 soldiers.) and 1,598 wounded (according to Holy League reports)	≈ as high as 30,000 killed, wounded, or drowned (Note: Among those killed were Grand Vizier Elmas Mehmed Pasha; Koca Cafer Pasha; the governors of Anatolia (Misırlızade İbrahim Pasha), Adana (Fazlı Pasha), Diyarbekir (Kavukçu İbrahim Pasha), Maraş (Yunus Pasha), and Rumelia (Küçük Cafer Pasha), along with numerous sanjak governors and military commanders.) (according to some modern historians); 7,000–8,000 losses (according to some Ottoman chronicles).

The Battle of Zenta, also known as the Battle of Senta, took place on 11 September 1697 near Zenta, in the Kingdom of Hungary, then under Ottoman occupation (present-day Serbia). It was a decisive engagement of the Great Turkish War, fought between the forces of the Ottoman Empire and the Holy League. The battle resulted in a significant Ottoman defeat against a numerically inferior Habsburg force acting on behalf of Leopold I, Holy Roman Emperor.

In 1697, the Ottoman Empire launched a renewed campaign to reclaim Hungary, with Sultan Mustafa II personally leading the invasion force. While the Ottoman army was in the process of crossing the Tisza River near Zenta, it was engaged in a surprise attack by Habsburg Imperial forces commanded by Prince Eugene of Savoy. Exploiting the Ottomans' vulnerable position mid-crossing, the Habsburg army inflicted heavy casualties, including the death of the Grand Vizier, while dispersing the remaining Ottoman troops. The victors also captured the Ottoman treasury and symbolic regalia, including the Seal of the Empire, an unprecedented event in Ottoman military history. In contrast, the Holy League sustained minimal losses.

The immediate aftermath of the battle saw the Ottoman Empire lose control of the Banat, while Eugene of Savoy advanced further by conducting raids into Ottoman Bosnia. The defeat at Zenta was among the most severe suffered by the Ottoman Empire, contributing directly to the conclusion of the Great Turkish War. The conflict formally ended with the Treaty of Karlowitz in 1699, which forced the Ottomans to cede significant territories, including Hungary, Transylvania, and Slavonia to the Habsburgs. The treaty marked the end of Ottoman dominance in Central Europe and established Habsburg hegemony in the region.

== Prelude ==
After the Battle of Vienna of 1683, a turning point seemed to have been reached in the Ottoman–Habsburg wars, with Austria and its allies capturing more Ottoman lands. By 1688 Belgrade and most of the Pannonian Plain was occupied by the Habsburgs. But as the war with the French demanded more troops, and the new grand vizier reorganised and reinvigorated the Ottoman Army, the success ended. Belgrade was recaptured by the Ottomans in 1690 and the following year's campaign was relatively indecisive after the Habsburg army failed in the second siege of Belgrade (1694). Subsequently, the Ottoman army commanded by Sultan Mustafa II won three consecutive victories at the Battle of Lugos (1695), Battle of Ulaş (1696), and Battle of Cenei (1696) while the Venetians lost Chios (1695).

On 18 April 1697, Mustafa embarked upon his third expedition, planning a massive invasion of Hungary. He left Edirne with a force of 100,000 men. The Sultan took personal command, reaching Belgrade late in the Summer, on 11 August. Mustafa gathered a war council the next day. On 18 August the Ottomans left Belgrade heading north towards Szeged.

== Battle ==
=== Opening manoeuvres ===
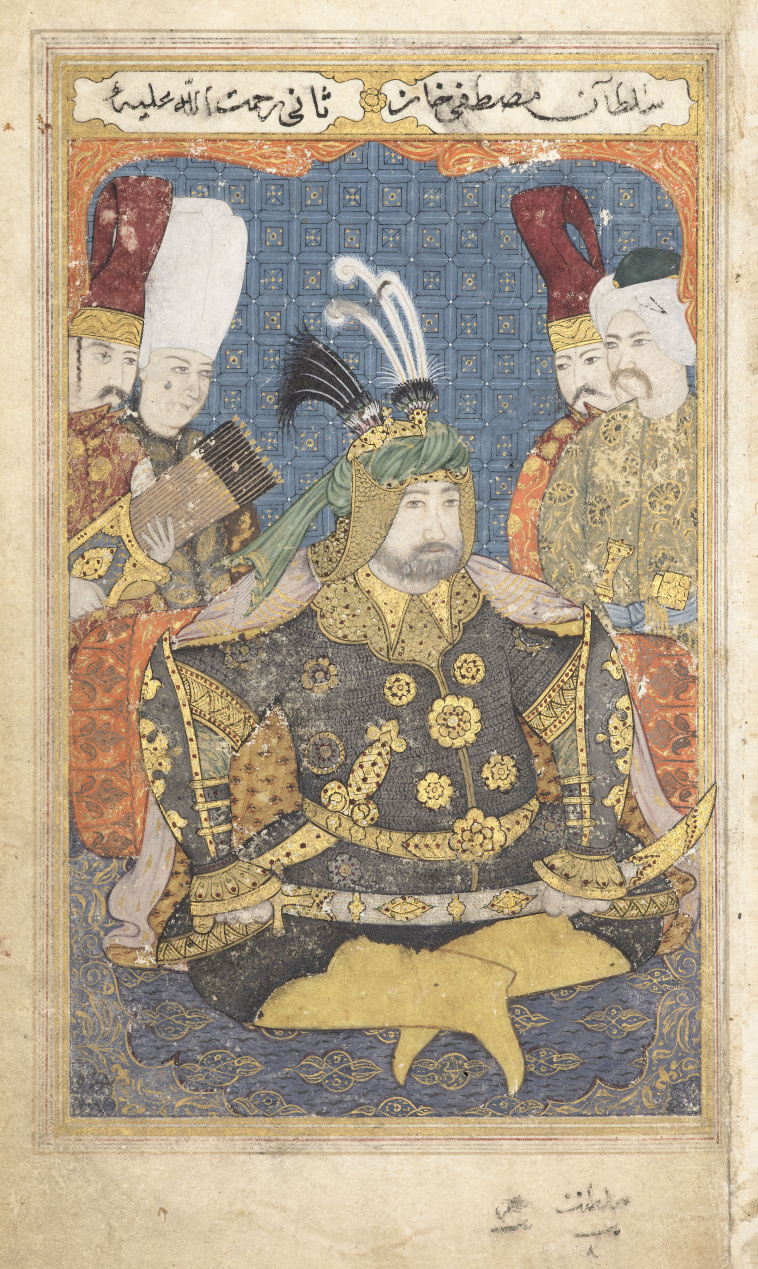
Mustafa II dressed in full armour.

On 5 July, in the newly conquered Pannonian Plain of Hungary, Prince Eugene of Savoy, a young French prince of Italian descent, who had distinguished himself greatly in battle, was appointed Commander-in-Chief by Emperor Leopold. His army consisted of 70,000 men with roughly 35,000 ready for battle. As the war chest was empty, Eugene borrowed money in order to pay wages and to create a working medical service. He requested that rations, ammunition and equipment be brought up to the level of an army of 50,000. When news arrived that the Sultan and his army had left Belgrade, Eugene decided to gather all his available troops from Upper Hungary and Transylvania and marched them towards Petrovaradin, on the Danube, upriver from Belgrade. Prince Eugene sent some troops north to Hegyalja to deal with anti-Habsburg Hungarian rebels while he worked on rebuilding the remainder of the army to face the Turks. After the concentration was completed, Eugene's forces numbered about fifty thousand to face the Ottomans.

The Habsburg army consisted of German, Austrian, Hungarian and Serbian infantry and cavalry forces. Palatine Paul Eszterházy of the Kingdom of Hungary contributed 12,000 soldiers; the Serbian Militia, 10,000 men, a majority of whom were cavalry, under the command of Jovan Popović Tekelija, also joined Eugene's forces. Serb conscripts were part of the coalition, notably Vice-Voivode Jovan Monasterlija with his 1,000 infantry and 700 cavalry soldiers.

Despite the advice of the warden of Belgrade, Amcazade Hüseyin Pasha, who proposed attacking Habsburg-held Petrovaradin northwest of Belgrade on the Danube River, Mustafa moved towards Transylvania. The Ottoman army counted on Hungarian Kuruc cavalry under the leadership of Imre Thököly, however many former Kuruc rebels had also joined the Holy League and the call for a crusade.

The Sultan and his army crossed the Danube, then made a detour west to capture Titel Castle at the confluence of the Tisza and the Danube. Finding the castle without a garrison, the Ottomans demolished it. In September, they headed north, along the right bank of the Tisza reaching the vicinity of the village of Zenta on the morning of 11 September. The River Tisza was the last major river barrier before Transylvania. Prince Eugene followed, marching the Imperial army south from Petrovaradin, crossed the Tisza river and headed upriver along the east bank. The Ottomans had no idea where the enemy was.

=== Ambush ===
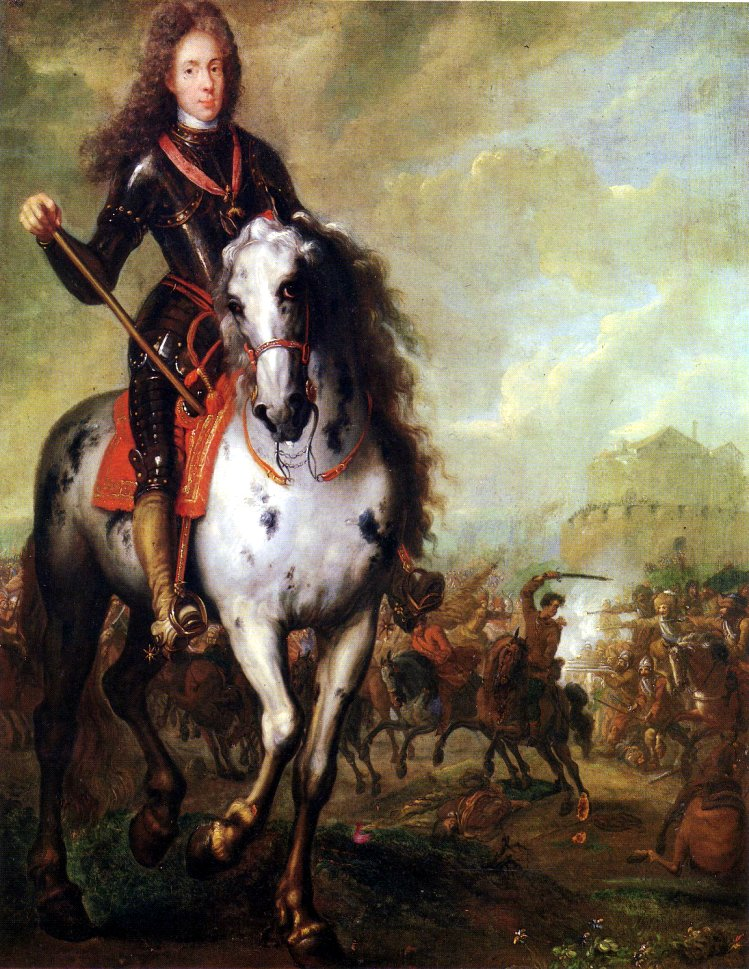
Prince Eugene of Savoy

On 11 September, the Ottoman army began to ford the River Tisza near Zenta, unaware that the Imperial Army was nearby. Captain Jovan Popović Tekelija, commander of the Serbian Militia, who was monitoring the advances of the Ottomans, immediately informed Prince Eugene, and a captured Ottoman pasha was forced to confirm the information. Tekelija then led the Imperial army over swamps and bog to the rear of the Turks encampment. A courier arrived from Vienna carrying peremptory orders from the emperor to "act with extreme caution" and not risk a general engagement. Not wanting to let the Turks slip across the river under cover of night, Eugene decided to carry on with his plan.

Two hours before sunset, the arrival of the Habsburg army, after a ten-hour forced march, shocked the Ottoman forces as they were still in the process of crossing the river and did not think that the Christian army could get there so quickly. Sultan Mustafa, his baggage, and the artillery were on the Temeşvar bank while most of the infantry was still with the Grand Vizier on the other bank.

As the light began to fall the entire Habsburg force, with cavalry on both flanks and the infantry in the centre, launched an all-out assault from the rear, attacking in a crescent shape movement against the defensive position of the Ottomans. The left flank of the Imperial army commanded by General Guido Starhemberg penetrated between the Ottoman left and the bridge, trapping them against the river. The army's right wing was under the command of General Sigbert Heister. At the same time, Imperial forces led by Charles-Thomas de Vaudémont, attacked from the front and, after engaging in close-quarter fighting, broke through the trenches surrounding the Ottoman camp. The command of the Turkish cavalry was under Hungarian Imre Thököly, who also supported the sultan with some additional Kuruc cavalry. The Imperial Dragoons of General Starhemberg dismounted and proceeded to the moat encircling and engaging the Ottoman camp and soon broke through the Turkish line of defence. Ottoman troops behind the entrenchments retreated in confusion to the bridge, which was now overcrowded, heavily bombarded, and soon collapsed.

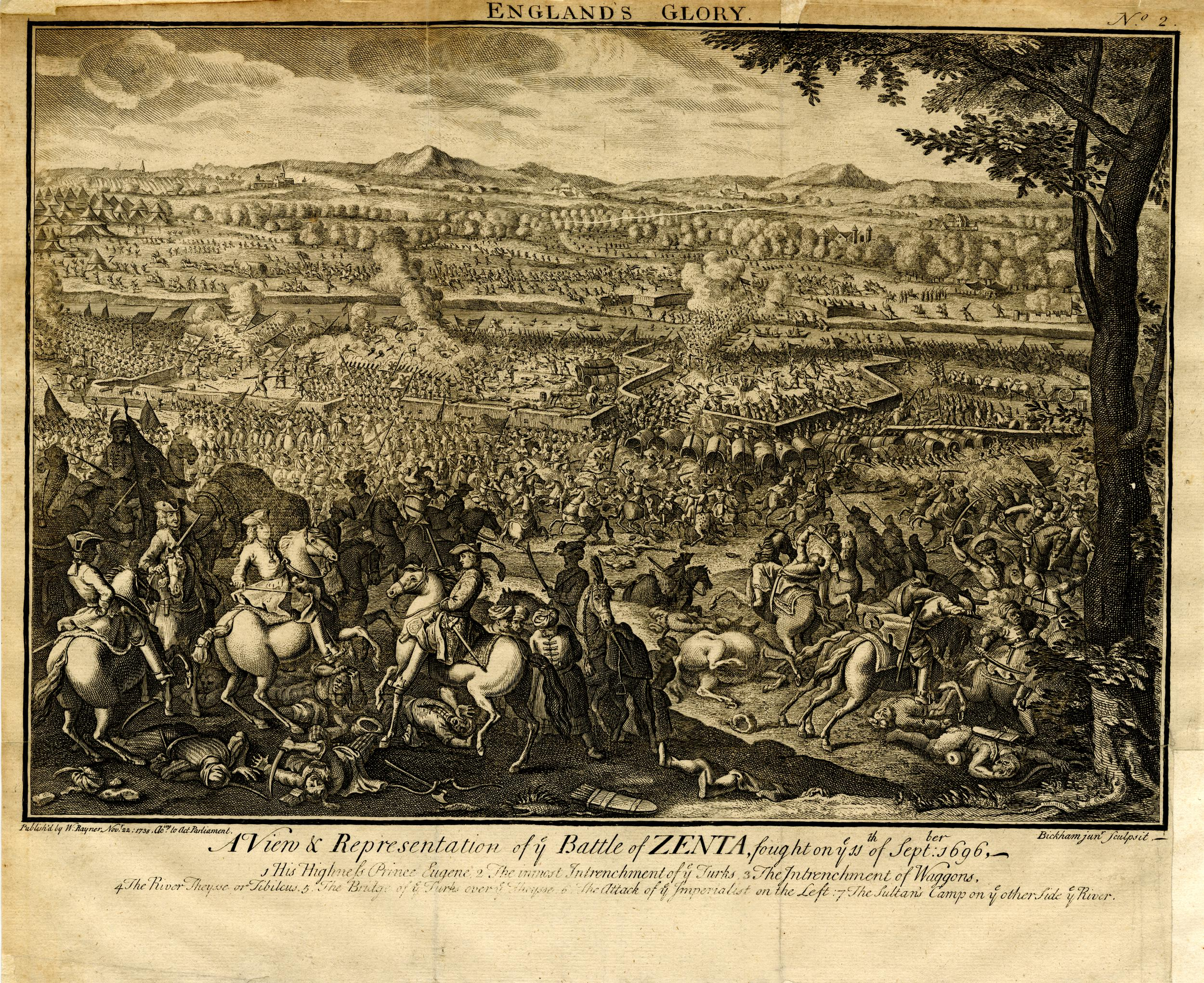
1735 engraving of the battle by George Bickham the Younger

Thrown into disorder, the trapped Ottoman troops fell into chaos with thousands falling into the river. Austrian artillery devastated the surviving Ottomans as they tried to escape. The Sultan watched helplessly from the other side, (Note: as documented by Ottoman historian, Mehmed Ağa who was with the Sultan's party, at Mustafa’s instruction, and chronicled the events in detail.) before he decided, after ordering the remaining troops to secure the bridge, to abandon his army and retreat. Escorted by a cavalry detachment and accompanied by his tutor and mentor Sheikh-ul-Islam Feyzullah Efendi, Mustafa set off for Temeşvar, without stopping along the way, taking only what horses could carry. When the Habsburg army reached the far bank they found that the sultan had left behind him 87 cannon, 9000 baggage carts, 6000 camels and 15,000 oxen. In addition, the Austrians found the Ottoman royal treasure chest, containing three million piastres and the state seal of Grand Sultan Mustafa II of the Ottoman Empire which had never been captured by an enemy before. The seal was inscribed with the words "Mustafa, son of Mehmed Han, always victorious" and the year of his accession to the throne "1106 of the Hejra" (1695 according to the Christian calendar). (Note: The Sultan's seal can be viewed today in the Museum of Military History in Vienna) After the victory, Prince Eugene personally presented the emperor with the pieces that were captured at the Battle of Zenta.

Several thousands of Turks died, including many of the most senior figures in the Ottoman military-administrative establishment; the grand vizier was murdered on the battlefield by mutinous Janissaries. In contrast, the Holy League reported that it had suffered only 429 casualties. The great difference in casualties was partly due to the tactical superiority of the imperial army and cannon technology which, unlike the Ottomans, the Austrians had improved to a great extent.

== Aftermath ==
The battle resulted in a spectacular victory for Austria. The main Ottoman army was scattered and the Austrians gained complete freedom of action in Ottoman Bosnia. On 22 October after Eugene mounted a raid with six thousand cavalry including Serbian Militia of the Sava, Sarajevo was captured; after the Ottomans killed the messengers sent to ask them to surrender, the city was plundered and burned to the ground.

After fourteen years of war, the battle at Zenta proved to be the catalyst for peace; within months mediators of both sides started peace negotiations in Sremski Karlovci under the supervision of English ambassador to Constantinople, William Paget. By the terms of the Treaty of Karlowitz, signed near Belgrade on 26 January 1699, Austria gained control of Hungary (except for the Banat of Temesvár and a small area of Eastern Slavonia), Transylvania, Croatia and Slavonia. A portion of the returned territories were reintegrated into the Kingdom of Hungary; the rest were organised as separate entities within the Habsburg monarchy, such as the Principality of Transylvania and the Military Frontier. The Turks kept Belgrade and Serbia, the Sava became the northernmost limit of the Ottoman Empire and Bosnia a border province. The victory ultimately formalised the withdrawal of the Turks from most of Hungary and the resulting treaty of Karlowitz marked the end of Ottoman dominance in Europe.

== Images ==
Battle of Zenta
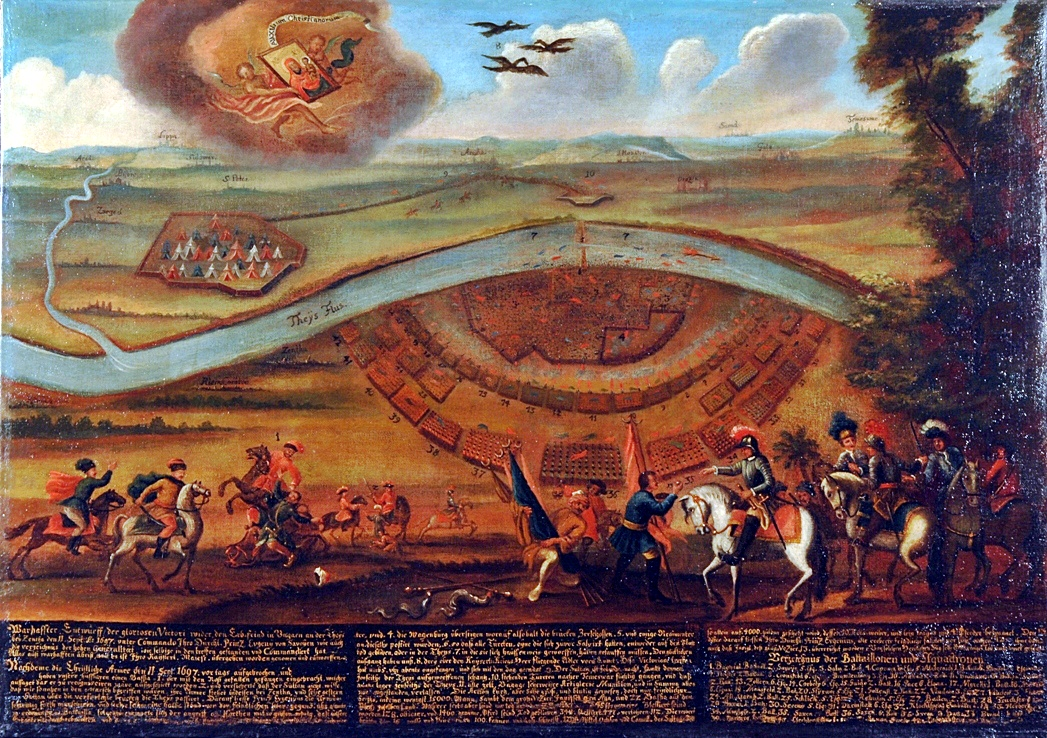
Painting of the battle from around 1698

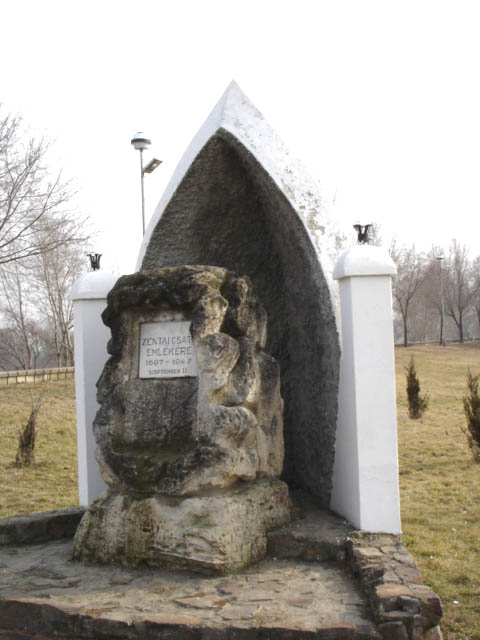
Monument to the battle in Senta, Serbia

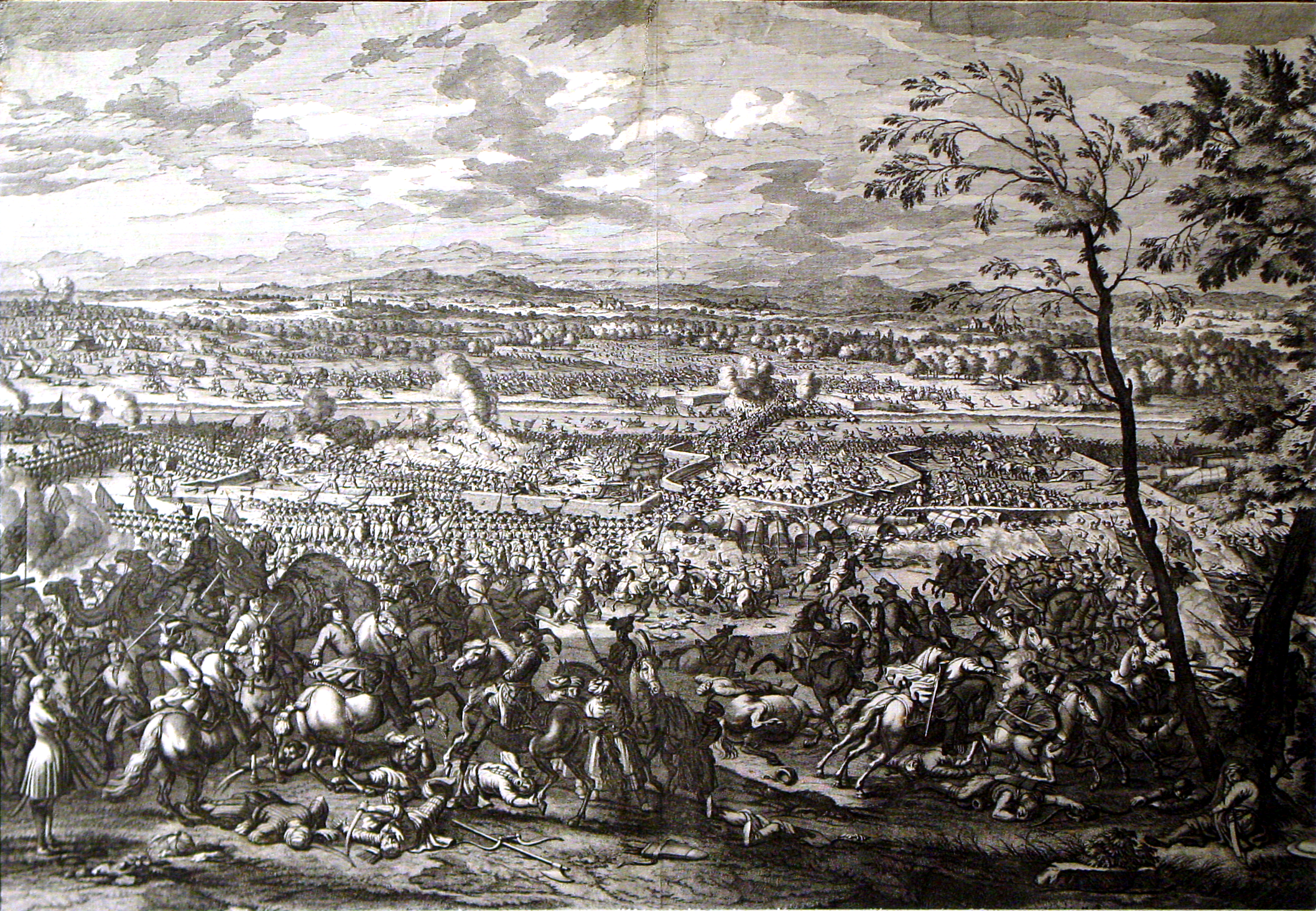
Depiction of the Battle of Senta 1697 by Jan van Huchtenburgh c. 1725

== See also ==
- Ottoman wars in Europe
