= Battle of Lugos =

1695 battle during the Great Turkish War

- Part of Great Turkish War
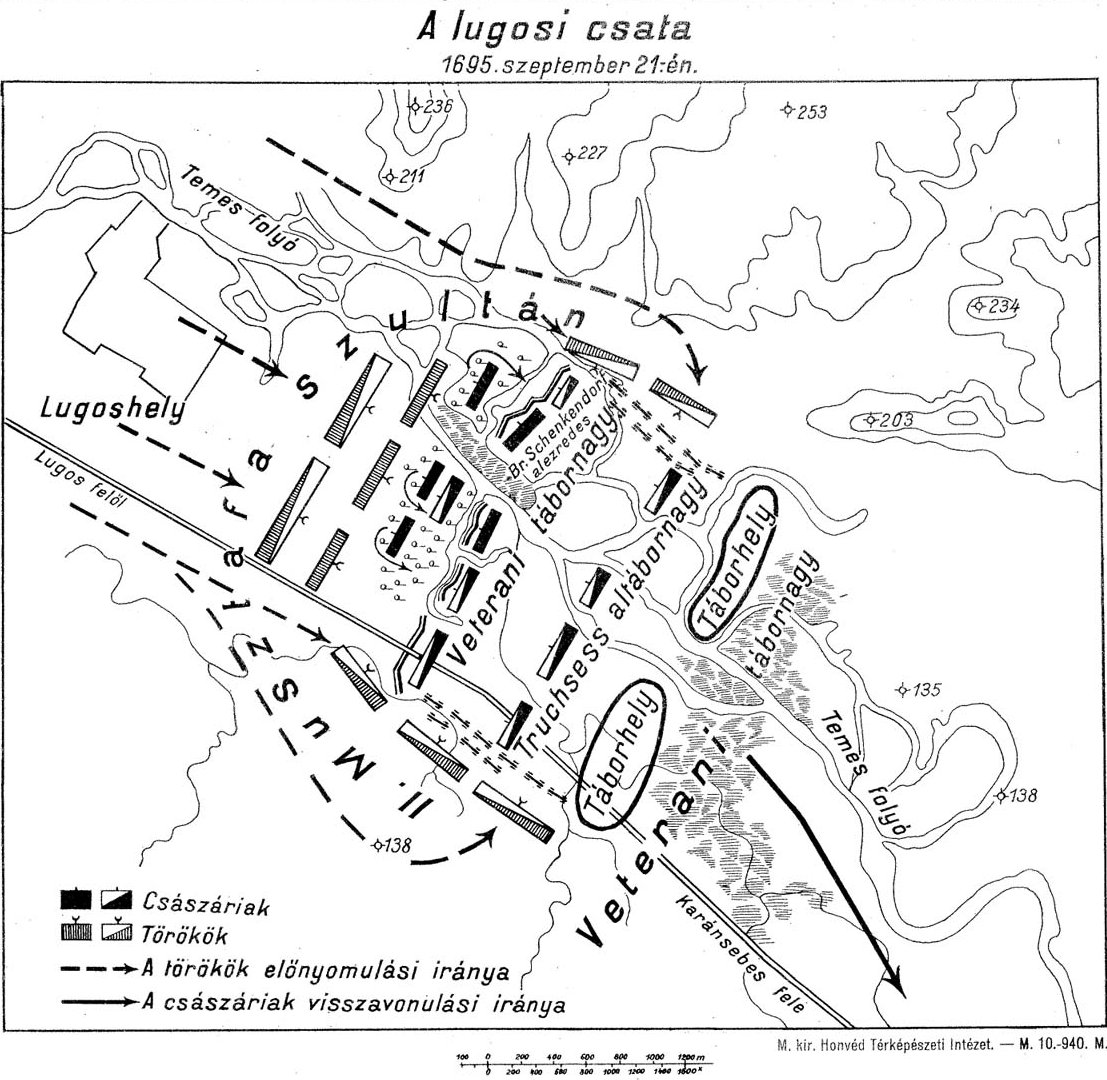
- Battle map
| Date | 21 September 1695 |
| Location | Lugos, Kingdom of Hungary (today: Lugoj, modern-day Romania) 45°39′59″N 21°57′42″E |
| Result | Ottoman victory |

Belligerents
| Holy Roman Empire; (Habsburg monarchy) Serbian Militia | Ottoman Empire; Crimean Khanate |

Commanders and leaders
| (Habsburg monarchy) Veterani (executed); (Habsburg monarchy) Antonije Znorić †; (Habsburg monarchy) Petrasch (WIA); (Habsburg monarchy) Maximilian (WIA) | (Ottoman Empire) Sultan Mustafa II; (Ottoman Empire) Elmas Mehmed Pasha Selim I Giray |

Strength
| 6,000–7,000 | 30,000 |

Casualties and losses
| 10,000 casualties; 5,000 killed; 5,000 captured | 10,000 killed |

The Battle of Lugos was fought on 21 September 1695 near the city of Lugos in the East Banat, between the forces of the Ottoman Empire and the forces of the Habsburg monarchy as part of the Great Turkish War.

== Background ==
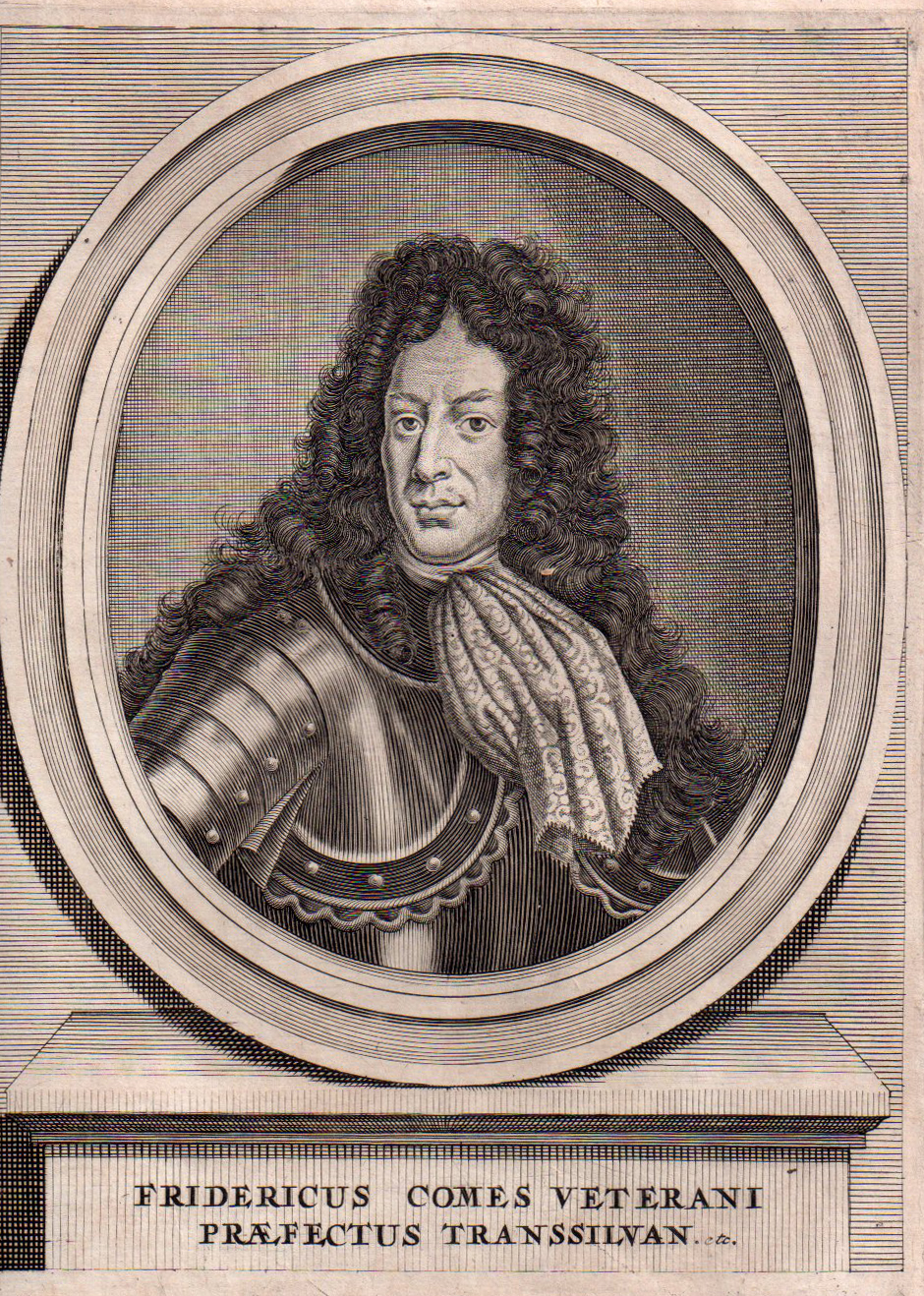
Austrian field marshal Federico Ambrosio Veterani di Urbino was killed during the battle.

By 1695 the Ottoman Empire had retaken the offensive in the war. Sultan Mustafa II ordered the renewal of the attack in Transylvania and his army captured Lipova shortly after. Defending the Banat region and encamped close to Lipova was the Austrian field marshal Johann Friedrich Ambrosius von Veterani (Italian: Federico Ambrosio Veterani, who was born in Urbino), commander in chief of the Transylvanian forces, with an army of 7,000 men.

== Battle ==
The Ottomans advanced from Lipova and clashed with the Christian army; General Veterani was unable to form a junction with the Imperial Army under Elector of Saxony Augustus II the Strong. The battle resulted in heavy casualties on both sides. Veterani was taken prisoner by the Turks and beheaded. Captain Strahinja and Antonije Znorić, commanders of the units of the Serbian Militia within the Austrian army, were also killed in the battle.

== Aftermath ==
The Great Turkish War continued until the replacement of Augustus by Eugene of Savoy as commander in chief, which ultimately led to the Ottoman Empire's defeat two years later at Zenta.

== Sources ==
- de Lamartine, Alphonse (2019). Osmanlı Tarihi (in Turkish). Translated by Serhat Bayram. Istanbul: Indie Yayınları. ISBN 978-605-69688-5-3.
- Silahdar, Fındıklılı Mehmed Ağa (2018). Nusretnâme (in Turkish). Translated by Mehmet Topal. Ankara: Türkiye Bilimler Akademisi.
- Öztuna, Yılmaz (March 2017). Osmanlı Devleti Tarihi: Siyasî Tarih. Vol. 1. Istanbul: Ötüken Neşriyat. ISBN 978-975-437-487-2.
- Hammer-Purgstall, Joseph von (1994). Mümin Çevik (ed.). Büyük Osmanlı Tarihi. Vol. 12. Üçdal Neşriyat.
- Coxe, William (1854). History of the House of Austria. Vol. 2. London: Spottiswoode & Co.
- Iorga, Nicolae (2005). Erhan Afyoncu (ed.). Osmanlı İmparatorluğu Tarihi. Vol. 4: 1640-1774. Translated by Nilüfer Epçeli. Istanbul: Yeditepe Yayınları. ISBN 975-6480-21-1.
- Zinkeisen, Johann Wilhelm (September 2011). Erhan Afyoncu (ed.). Osmanlı İmparatorluğu Tarihi. Vol. 5: 1669-1774. Translated by Nilüfer Epçeli. Istanbul: Yeditepe Yayınevi. ISBN 978-605-4052-69-1.
