= Franz Eisenhut =

Danube Swabian painter

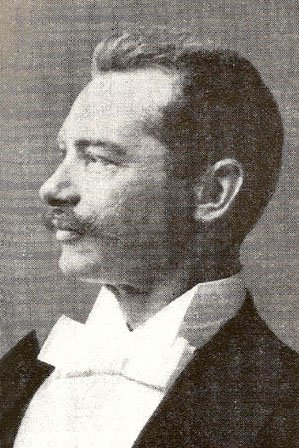
- Born: 25 January 1857; Nova Palanka, Voivodeship of Serbia and Banat of Temeschwar, Austrian Empire
- Died: 2 June 1903 (aged 46); Munich, Kingdom of Bavaria
- Education: Royal Academy of Fine Arts, Munich
- Known for: Painting
- Notable work: Death of Gül Baba (1886); Battle of Zenta (1896)
- Movement: Realism, Orientalism

Franz Eisenhut (Hungarian: Eisenhut Ferencz; Serbian Cyrillic: Франц Ајзенхут; 25 January 1857 – 2 June 1903) was a prominent Danube Swabian Realist and Orientalist painter. He is considered one of Austria-Hungary's greatest academic painters in the second half of the 19th century. His most famous and recognizable paintings include Death of Gül Baba, Battle of Zenta, Slave trade and Cock fighting and many other, depicting mostly motifs from the Orient. His works can be found in many European museums across the continent.

== Biography ==
Franz Eisenhut was born in Nova Palanka, Voivodeship of Serbia and Banat of Temeschwar, Austrian Empire (today Bačka Palanka, Vojvodina province, Serbia) in a German family. His father, Georg Eisenhut was from Palanka, and his mother Theresia Sommer was from Bukin.

His father had hoped for Franz to become a merchant, but the Hungarian painter Telepy Károly discovered his talent for painting. Influential citizens of Palanka at the time, led by lawyer Karl Mezey and pharmacist Karlo Harliković, collected money for his studies. He studied at Hungarian Royal Drawing School in Budapest from 1875 until 1877. Afterwards, he became a student of the Royal Academy of Fine Arts in Munich. He studied there until 1883 in class of Gyula Benczúr, the Hungarian painter.

After finishing the academy, he went on a trip to the Orient for the first time, visiting the Caucasus. The next year, he held his first exhibition in Budapest. The Orient became his main source of inspiration and Orientalist paintings will become his most famous works. In 1883 and 1884, he went to the Caucasus once again, visiting Tbilisi and Baku. In 1886 and 1887, he traveled from Naples to Tunisia and Algeria. His first great success was the 1886 painting "Healing through the Koran in Beirut".

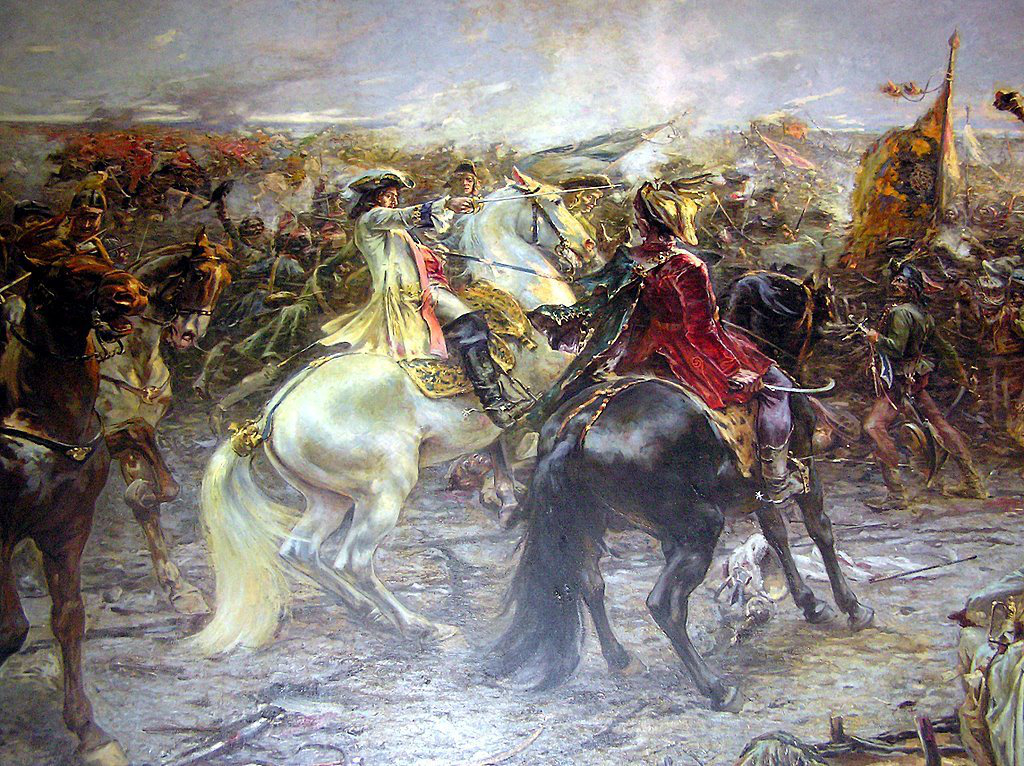
Battle of Zenta (detail, 1896)

Many of his paintings were reproduced by woodcutting workshops across Europe, because, as his friend Lyka Karoly claimed, "his paintings showed the authentic Orient". Lyka Karoly also gave a detailed description of Eisenhut's studio in Munich, which was located at Mozartstrasse 13/4. Another famous painting made at the time was Death of Gül Baba, for which he won the State Gold Medal at an exhibition in Budapest. Afterwards, he had exhibitions in Munich, Paris and Madrid. In 1894, he painted the interior of New York Palace in Budapest.

Eisenhut's most famous work is the painting "Battle of Zenta", made in 1896 for the Hungarian Millennium Exhibition, celebrating 1000 years since the Hungarian settlement in the Great Hungarian Plain. The painting was ordered by the Bács-Bodrog County and is still exhibited in Sombor City Hall, as Sombor was the county seat at the time. This painting, with dimensions of 7x4 meters, is the largest oil painting in the Balkans today.

In 1897, he returned to Palanka, where he married Adriana Reichl, daughter of Friedrich Reichl, owner of the Reichl cement factory in Neu-Palanka and brother of the famous architect from Apatin. Franz Reichl. In 1898 they had a daughter, who died soon afterwards on their journey to Samarkand, when the family was returning from Emirate of Bukhara. Eisenhut was invited to Bukhara personally by the Emir 'Abd al-Ahad Khan. In 1901, their second daughter Judith was born, and in 1903, Eisenhut 's only son Franz Georg, who was later the founder of leather industry Merkur in Bačka Palanka. However, Eisenhut got seriously ill while in Munich and died on 2 June 1903. He was buried in the Ostfriedhof cemetery in Munich. A street in Palanka was named "Eisenhutgasse" after him.
