= Serbian Militia =

Auxiliary military unit of the Habsburg Monarchy (1686–1704)

- Српска милиција / Srpska milicija
- Active: 1686–1704
- Disbanded: 1704
- Country: (Habsburg monarchy) Habsburg Monarchy
- Allegiance: Habsburg Monarchy
- Branch: Imperial Army
- Type: Cavalry and Infantry
- Role: Irregular warfare, frontier defence, auxiliary support
- Size: Up to 10,000
- Part of: Habsburg Military Frontier
- Garrison: Various locations along the Military Frontier
- Nicknames: Hayduks, Husars, Rascian Militia, Monasterlija's Serbs
- Weapons: Various firearms, sabres, cavalry lances
- Engagements: Great Turkish War: Siege of Belgrade (1688); Battle of Batočina; Battle of Niš (1689); Battle of Zenta; Battle of Slankamen; Battle of Lugos

Commanders
- First Commander: Pavle Nestorović
- Notable commanders: Jovan Monasterlija; Antonije Znorić; Subota Jović; Jovan Popović Tekelija

The Serbian (Rascian) Militia (Latin: Rascianica militia; Serbian: Рашка милиција, Srpska milicija) was an auxiliary military unit of the Habsburg Monarchy composed primarily of Serbs. It was active between approximately 1686 and 1704 and operated as part of the Habsburg military structure during the Great Turkish War.

The unit was formed to support Habsburg forces in their campaigns against the Ottoman Empire, particularly in the Pannonian Plain and along the Military Frontier. The Serbian militia consisted of both infantry and cavalry, engaging in irregular warfare, frontier defence, and auxiliary operations alongside the Imperial Army. Its organisation followed a decentralised model, with Serbian commanders overseeing military operations under Habsburg authority. The Serbian militia was eventually disbanded in 1704 as part of administrative and military reforms.

== Formation ==
The formation of the militia occurred as the Habsburg Monarchy and its allies sought to expel Ottoman forces from Central Europe. Following the Ottoman failure at the Battle of Vienna in 1683, a coalition of European states, under Habsburg leadership and with support from the Holy See, intensified military operations against Ottoman-held territories. During this period, Orthodox Serbs began participating in the conflict as auxiliary troops. Initially deployed in an irregular capacity, they were progressively incorporated into the Habsburg military structure, with their contributions becoming increasingly significant.

The Habsburg capture of Belgrade marked a turning point in the war, as Serbian forces provided strategic value due to their regional knowledge and experience in irregular warfare. A decree issued on 5 October 1689 officially established the Serbian Militia as a distinct military unit organised under direct Habsburg authority. The force is referred to in contemporary sources as the Latin: Rascianica militia (Latin), Razische Miliz (German), or Srpska milicija (Serbo-Croatian).

Command of the militia was entrusted to Pavle Nestorović, with operational control remaining exclusively in the hands of Serb officers. The force adhered to a četa based structure, emphasizing small, mobile units suited for rapid deployment and flexible engagement. Membership was restricted to Serb recruits, reinforcing the militia's role as an ethnically defined military formation within the Habsburg system. The militia also functioned as a means for Serb communities to exercise a measure of self-governance in military affairs. The militia became an integral component of Habsburg military operations.

== Operational history ==
=== Great Turkish War (1686–99) ===
After allied Christian forces had captured Buda from the Ottoman Empire in 1686 during the Great Turkish War, Serbs from Pannonian Plain (present-day Hungary, Slavonia region in present-day Croatia, Bačka and Banat regions in present-day Serbia) joined the troops of the Habsburg monarchy as separate units known as the Serbian Militia. Serbs, as volunteers, massively joined the Austrian side.

In the first half of 1688 the Habsburg army together with units of Serbian Militia captured Gyula, Lipova and Ineu from the Ottoman Empire. After Belgrade had been liberated from the Ottomans in 1688, Serbs from the territories in the south of Sava and Danube rivers began to join Serbian Militia units. One of the first commanders of the Serbian Militia during the Great Turkish War was Antonije Znorić. In the period 1689—1691, one of the commanders of Serbian Militia units in Banat was Novak Petrović.

The Ottoman Empire had suffered partial military collapse against the Austrians in the 1680s, most notably at the Battle of Vienna in 1683, and the loss of Belgrade to Maximilian II of Bavaria in 1688 and Bosnia in 1689. However, with the beginning of the Nine Years War in the west, the early 1690s saw an end to Habsburg conquests in the Balkans and a partial Ottoman recovery. Despite Ottoman recovery and weakening of Habsburg military presence on the Danube (most Habsburg soldiers were sent to fight the French) the Habsburg supreme command planned offensive activities against Ottomans, relying heavily on the Serbian Militia and Serb rebels in the Balkans. In 1689 Louis William was appointed as chief commander of the Imperial army in its invasion of the territory of present-day Serbia. Before the invasion Louis William recruited Serb rebels all over territory of present-day Serbia, whose infantry units were called hayduks while cavalry units of Serb rebels were called Serb hussars.

On 29 August 1689 the Militia under the command of Pavle Nestorović as a Habsburg vanguard unit were victorious against an Ottoman vanguard unit during the Battle of Batočina. On 4 October 1689 Nestorović was appointed supreme commander of all militia units in Serbia.

Jovan Monasterlija, who was appointed as captain of Serbian Militia in 1690, recruited Serbs into his units in the summer of 1690 on the southern border of the Austrian Empire. During the Battle of Slankamen on August 19, 1691, the 10,000-strong militia under the command of Monasterlija participated in the important victory over Ottoman forces. When Austrian forces supported by the militia captured Oradea in the spring of 1692, the seat of the Serbian Militia's headquarter became Baja. As a reward for his importance in the Battle of Zenta, Jovan Tekelija was appointed captain of the Serbian Militia in Arad in 1698.

The Austrian Empire had intentions to reduce the power and importance of Serbian Militia and its military and religious leaders by dividing it to smaller units and sending them to different distant parts of the Empire. Monasterlija's rank was changed from Serbian vice-voivode and Chief of the Serbian Nation to Rascian obercaptain. Because of the constant Ottoman threat such plans were never fully implemented.

=== Aftermath and disbandment ===
Following the Treaty of Karlowitz in 1699, which ended the war, the strategic role of the Serbian Militia was significantly reduced. Many Serbs who had settled in the Military Frontier had expected continued Habsburg military campaigns to reclaim Serbia from the Ottoman Empire, allowing them to return to their homes following the Great Serb Migration. However, as the Habsburg Monarchy shifted its military focus, these hopes diminished. Serbian settlers in the Military Frontier faced increasing pressure from Austrian authorities, who sought to consolidate control over the region. Efforts to Catholicize the Orthodox Serb population, along with attempts to curtail their privileges, including their right to own arable land, led to growing dissatisfaction. These conditions prompted many militia members to consider migration to the Russian Empire where Peter the Great actively encouraged the settlement of experienced military personnel.

In 1703, the outbreak of Rákóczi's War of Independence presented a new challenge to Habsburg rule in Hungary. The Austrian authorities, viewing the Serbian Militia as a reliable and cost-effective force, deployed Serbian units against Francis II Rákóczi's Hungarian rebels, who sought to overthrow Habsburg control. The Serbian Militia played an important role in the conflict, with the Austrian government supporting its privileged position, seeing it as a counterbalance to the separatist aspirations of Hungarian officials. Hungarian authorities, in contrast, regarded the militia with hostility, perceiving it as a threat to their political influence.

In 1704, Jovan Monasterlija's militia engaged Rákóczi's forces near Baja, a strategically important town in southern Hungary. The battle ended in defeat for the militia, forcing many Serbian fighters to retreat from the town. Despite this setback, Serbian forces continued to operate in smaller formations, often as part of integrated Habsburg military units. By the end of 1704, the Serbian Militia was formally disbanded, as the Habsburg Monarchy sought to reorganize its military forces in Hungary. While some Serbian fighters were absorbed into frontier regiments, others migrated to Russia.

== Commanders ==
- Antonije Znorić (fl. 1688–d. 1695), capitain, leutnant, oberstleutnant (1694)
- Pavle Nestorović Deak (fl. 1688–99), capitain (1688), leutnant (1689–99)
- Jovan Monasterlija (1660s–1706), capitain (1690), vice-wojwode (1691), obercapitain (1693)
- Subota Jović (fl. 1691), capitain (1691)
- Jovan Popović Tekelija (1660–1722), capitain (1697–98)
- Strahinja (fl. 1691), capitain (1691)
- Todor Rupić (fl. 1691), capitain (1691)
- Pantelija-Pane Božić (fl. 1692), capitain (1692)
- Stefan Prodan Šteta (fl. 1695), capitain (1695)

== See also ==
- Serbian Militia (1718–39)
- Serbian Free Corps
- Military Frontier

== Annotations ==
The organization was officially named "Serbian National Militia" (Latin: Rascianae Nationis Militia).

== Sources ==
- Andrić, Ljubisav (1991). Seoba u sporovima. Književna zajednica Novog Sada. ISBN 9788673312286.
- Cerović, Ljubivoje (2002). Srbi u Ukrajini. Muzej Vojvodine. ISBN 9788682077169.
- Cerović, Ljubivoje (1997), Srbi u Slovačkoj, OCLC 163390979
- Davidov, Dinko (1990). Spomenici Budimske eparhije (in Serbian). Prosveta. p. 284. ISBN 9788607004805.
- Gavrilović, Slavko; Jakšić, Ivan (1987). Izvori o Srbima u Ugarskoj s kraja XVII i početkom XVIII veka, Volume 30 (in Serbian). Belgrade: Srpska akademija nauka i umetnosti. pp. 194–.
- Kostić, Mita; Lalić, Sredoje; Gavrilović, Slavko (2001). Nova Srbija i Slavenosrbija. Srpsko-ukrajinsko društvo. ISBN 978-86-902499-1-6.
- Šain, M. (2025). Navigating Faith, Power, and Security: Securitisation of the Serbian-Orthodox Minority in the Habsburg Monarchy 1690–1740. Studien Zur Geschichte, Kultur Und Gesellschaft Südosteuropas. Lit Verlag. ISBN 978-3-643-91589-4.
- Tanić, Dejan (2005), Војно-стратешки значај средњег поморавља у Бечком Рату (1683–1699) (PDF) (in Serbian), Istorijski Arhiv Jagodine, p. 74, archived from the original (PDF) on 26 April 2012
