= Elmas Mehmed Pasha =

Grand Vizier of the Ottoman Empire from 1695 to 1697

Grand Vizier of the Ottoman Empire
- In office 3 May 1695 – 11 September 1697
- Monarch: Mustafa II
- Preceded by: Sürmeli Ali Pasha
- Succeeded by: Amcazade Köprülü Hüseyin Pasha

Personal details
- Born: 1661 Doğanyurt, Ottoman Empire
- Died: 11 September 1697 (aged 35–36) Senta, Ottoman Serbia

Military service
- Allegiance: Ottoman Empire
- Years of service: 1695–1697
- Rank: Commander-in-Chief
- Battles/wars: Great Turkish War: Battle of Lugos; Battle of Ulaş; Battle of Zenta †

Elmas Mehmed Pasha (1661 – 11 September 1697) was an Ottoman statesman who served as grand vizier from 1695 to 1697. His epithet Elmas means "diamond" in Persian and refers to his fame as a handsome man.

== Early years ==
He was a Turk from Doğanyurt (formerly Hoşalay), now in Kastamonu Province of Turkey. His father was a sea captain (Turkish: reis). During the reign of Mehmed IV, he began working for the Ottoman palace upon the personal request of the sultan. He was one of the few Ottoman statesmen who were fortunate enough to be appointed to high posts while still young. During the reign of Ahmed II, he was appointed as the nişancı in 1688 and a vizier (government minister) in 1689.

== As a grand vizier ==
The Ottoman Empire had been experiencing a period of defeats during the Great Turkish War following the Second Siege of Vienna in 1683. After the execution of Kara Mustafa Pasha, 11 grand viziers had been in the office between 1683 and 1695. Elmas Mehmed Pasha was appointed as the grand vizier on 2 May 1695 by the sultan Mustafa II. He was more successful than his immediate predecessors, and together with the sultan, he defeated Habsburg Empire in two battles, namely the Battle of Lugos and the Battle of Ulaş.

He was not only a military leader. He also tried to reform the treasury. One of the most important problems of the 17th-century Ottoman economy was the devaluated coins. He collected various coins (including European coins) and minted new gold and silver coins in the name of Mustafa II.

== Battle of Zenta and death ==
His luck failed him during the battle of Zenta on 11 September 1697. A subordinate of Elmas Mehmed Pasha was arrested by the Habsburgs prior to the battle. Prince Eugene of Savoy, the Habsburg commander, learned about the campaign plan of the Ottoman side and the Habsburgs raided the Ottoman army while the army was crossing the bridge over Tisa. Elmas Mehmed tried to organize an orderly withdrawal and he had to fight against the undisciplined soldiers who were in panic. He was killed by his own soldiers, strangled to death with a bowstring. Two years later the Ottoman Empire had to sign the Treaty of Karlowitz and had to accept the loss of Hungary.

Political offices
Preceded by Sürmeli Ali Pasha	Grand Vizier of the Ottoman Empire; 3 May 1695 – 11 September 1697	Succeeded by Amcazade Köprülü Hüseyin Pasha
