= Battle of Batočina =

1689 battle during the Great Turkish War

- Part of Great Turkish War
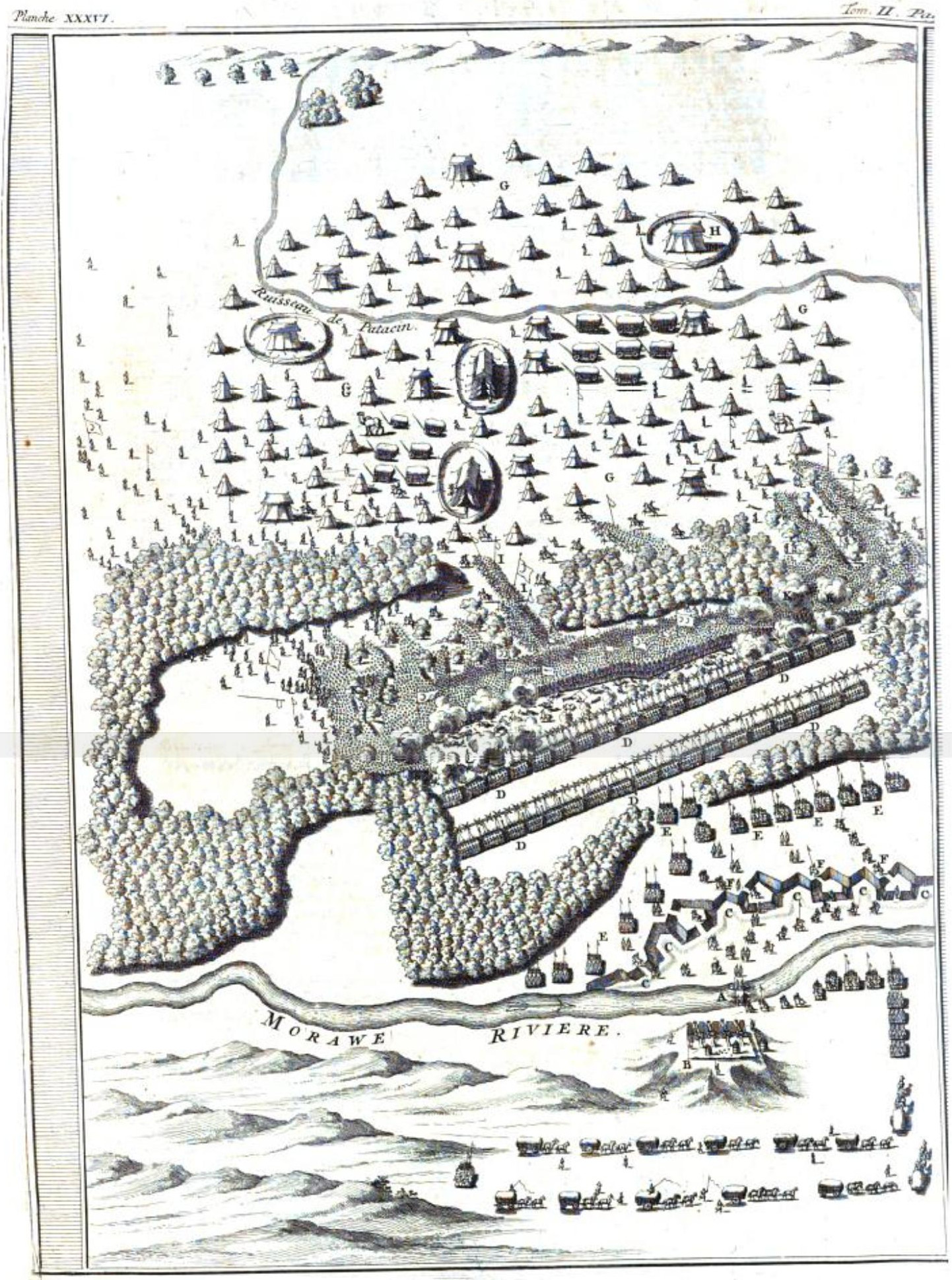
Date	29–30 August 1689
Location	Batočina, Ottoman Empire
Result	Holy Roman Empire victory

Belligerents
Holy Roman Empire; (Habsburg monarchy) Serbian Militia	Ottoman Empire

Commanders and leaders
Margrave of Baden; Pavle Nestorović	Arap Recep Pasha

Units involved
Serbian Militia	

Strength
17,815; 9,262 infantry; 8,553 cavalry	40,000

Casualties and losses
400	3,000; 108 guns 3 mortars Entire camp and baggage

The Battle of Batočina (Serbian: Битка код Баточине) was fought on 29–30 August 1689 near the town of Batočina in the Sanjak of Smederevo (now in central Serbia), between forces of the Holy Roman Empire and the Ottoman Empire during the Great Turkish War (1683–1699). The Serbian Militia under the command of Pavle Nestorović as a vanguard unit of the Habsburg army was victorious against a vanguard unit of the Ottoman army during the battle.

== Sources ==
- Jovan N. Tomić (1902). Deset godina iz istorije srpskog naroda i crkve pod Turcima (1683-1693). Štampano u Državnoj štampariji Kraljevine Srbije.
