= Battle of Niš (1689) =

1689 battle during the Great Turkish War

- Part of Great Turkish War
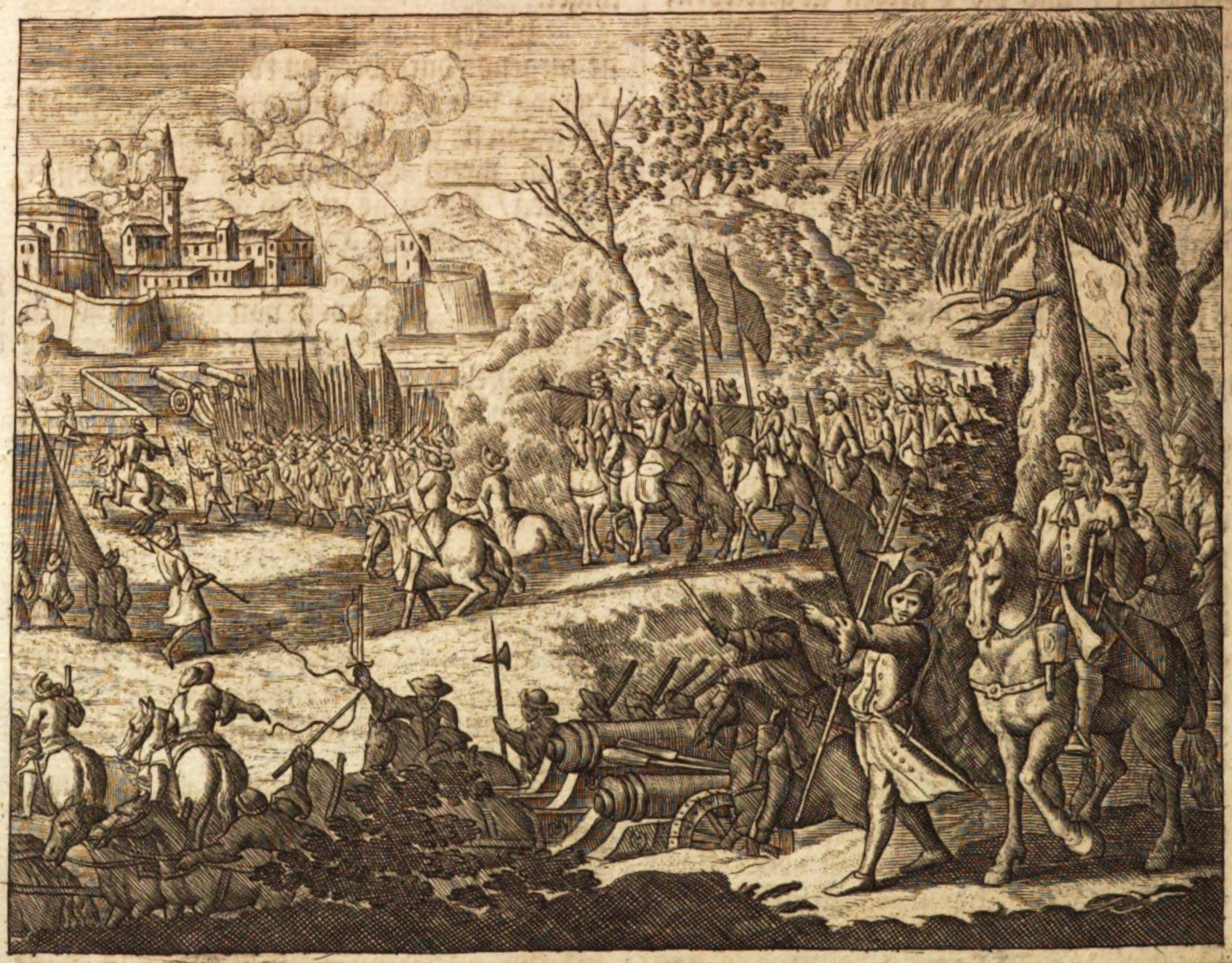
- 17th-century engraving of the Siege of Niš
Date	24 September 1689
Location	Niš, Ottoman Empire
Result	Decisive Imperial victory

Belligerents
Holy Roman Empire: (Habsburg monarchy) Serbian Militia	Ottoman Empire

Commanders and leaders
Margrave of Baden; Enea Silvio Piccolomini; Pavle Nestorović	Unknown

Units involved
Serbian Militia	

Strength
16,000	40,000–70,000

Casualties and losses
400	Unknown

The Battle of Niš was fought on 24 September 1689, near the city of Niš in southern Serbia, between the Ottoman Empire and the Holy Roman Empire as part of the Great Turkish War.

The Austrian commander, Louis William, Margrave of Baden-Baden, defeated the Ottomans and captured the city. When Louis William learned that there were no Ottoman defensive positions on Vinik, he ordered Pavle Nestorović to attack it. Nestorović managed to bypass the right flank of the Ottoman forces and win the battle. For this achievement, Nestorović was promoted to the rank of lieutenant.

After the battle Louis left Lieutenant-General Piccolomini in charge of the sanjak of Niš and marched to Vidin, where he attacked the Ottoman garrison on 14 October and received its capitulation on 19 October. Piccolomini led a campaign deep into Macedonia. The Ottomans retook Niš the following September after the Austrians abandoned the city.

== See also ==
- Fire of Skopje 1689
- Karposh's Rebellion

== Sources ==
- Mirčetić, Dragoljub (1994). Vojna istorija Niša: deo 1. Od najstarijih vremena do prvog srpskog ustanka. deo 2. U sredjem veku (700-1459). deo 3. U razdoblju Turske vlasti (1459-1878). Prosveta. ISBN 978-87-7455-152-2.
- Gavrilović, Slavko (1993). Iz istorije Srba u Hrvatskoj, Slavoniji i Ugarskoj: XV-XIX vek. Filip Višnjić. ISBN 978-86-7363-126-4.
