= Imperial Army (Holy Roman Empire) =

In the history of the Holy Roman Empire, the term Imperial Army may refer to:

- Army of the Holy Roman Empire (German: Reichsarmee), the army of the empire as a whole, to which all states contributed when ordered by the Imperial Diet
- Imperial Army of the Holy Roman Emperor (German: Kaiserliche Armee), the standing army owing service to the emperor and largely raised from his states
