= Uherčice =

Uherčice may refer to places in the Czech Republic:

- Uherčice (Břeclav District), a municipality and village in the South Moravian Region
- Uherčice (Znojmo District), a municipality and village in the South Moravian Region
- Úherčice, a municipality and village in the Pardubice Region
