= Antonio Carafa (general) =

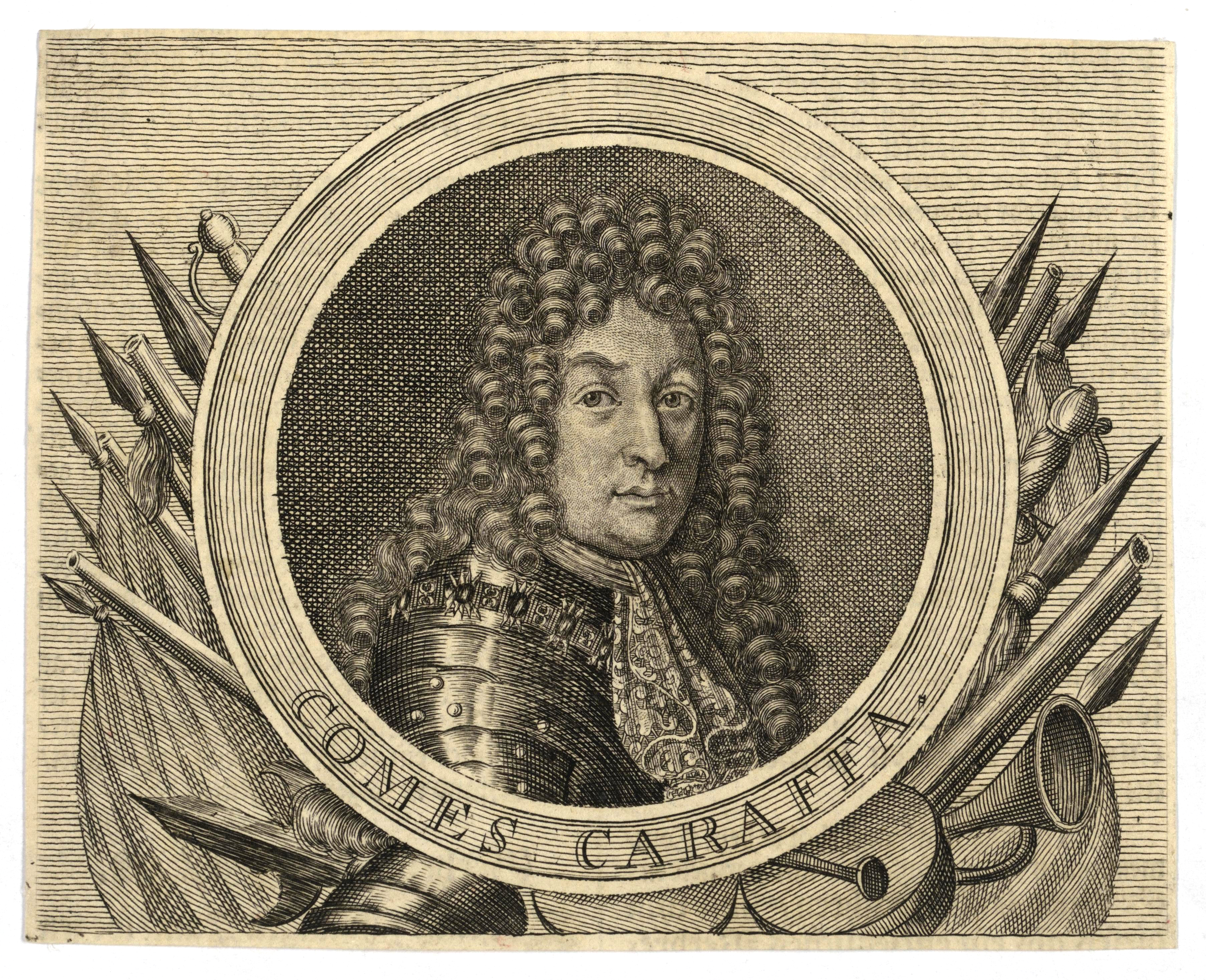
Antonio von Carafa

Antonio von Carafa (1646 – 6 March 1693) was a General Commissary (Generalkriegskommissär) of the Imperial-Habsburg Army—the highest rank in the Austrian military hierarchy at the time. He also held various other high-ranking offices, including military governor of Upper Hungary and later royal commissioner of Transylvania.

He was born in the Neapolitan House of Carafa. He was introduced at the Imperial Court (Kaiserhof) in Vienna in 1655 by his cousin Cardinal Carlo Carafa della Spina. Later he entered the Imperial Army, and became a Colonel in 1672, when he participated in the War against the Turks in Hungary.

During the Siege of Vienna (1683), he was sent by Leopold I, Holy Roman Emperor to Warsaw, to urge Polish King John III Sobieski to come to the help of the city. In 1685, he took Prešov from the Turks.

After the conquest of Upper Hungary, he was appointed its military governor. He set up the Executive Court of Prešov, by which he ruthlessly persecuted followers of Imre Thököly; the Court, whose proceedings remained secret, made widespread use of torture and executed seventeen supposed conspirators. For this event, Carafa developed a reputation for cruelty among Hungarians. The Hungarian nobility complained to the Emperor and Carafa was given another position as General Commissary of the army.

He remained in Imperial service and conquered Palanok Castle in Mukachevo, defended by Ilona Zrínyi after a siege of three years. In this way, he was appointed royal commissioner of Transylvania, and managed to persuade Mihály Teleki and an important part of the nobility to switch to the Austrian side. He also conquered Lipova and Lugoj.

His administration of Transylvania was also remembered as heavy-handed, for he extracted more taxes than the Ottomans had collected tribute.

He played a very important role in the conquest of Belgrade in 1688, and was for this rewarded with the Order of the Golden Fleece and lands in Voćin, Slavonia.

In 1691, he commanded the Austrian troops in the Nine Years' War in Italy.

His deeds were chronicled by Giambattista Vico in De rebus gestis Antonj Caraphaei, first published in 1716 at the commission of Adriano Antonio Carafa (1696–1765).
