= Executive Court of Prešov =

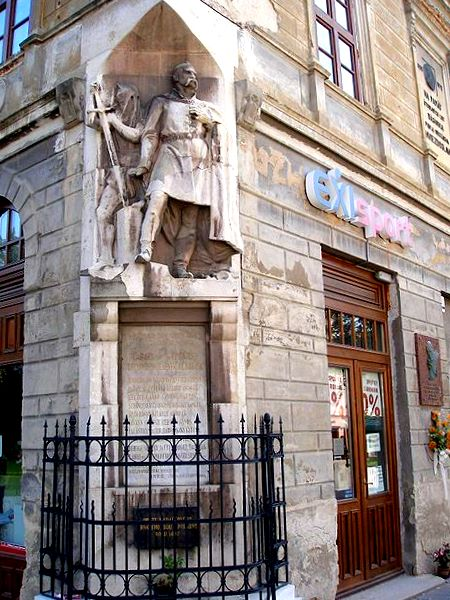
Monument to the executed in Prešov.

The Executive Court of Prešov (Slovak: Prešovský krvavý súd or Prešovské jatky, Hungarian: eperjesi vésztörvényszék), also known as Caraffa's slaughter, was a political court founded by the Neapolitan count and imperial general Antonio Caraffa in 1687 in Prešov (Eperjes), Kingdom of Hungary to punish followers of Imre Thököly, leader of anti-Habsburg rebellion. The Result of the court was execution of more than 24 Hungarians, Germans and Slovaks. While some of those executed had taken part in rebellion, many of them were innocent and had been falsely accused.

An eyewitness of these events, Ján (Johannes) Rezík, a professor of theology at the Evangelical College in Prešov, wrote memories of the course of the trial and executions.

== Previous events ==
Thököly's uprising against Habsburg rulers was also supported by many citizens of Prešov. In 1684 better equipped and more numerous imperial army, under leadership of General Schultz achieved an important victory. Defenders of Prešov withdrew behind the city walls and began to fortify it. But when they saw the hopelessness of their situation, they agreed to surrender. Conditions of surrender were not disgraceful at all. The city was guaranteed its privileges to date, as well as the personal and property inviolability of the citizens - even the previous infidelity to the emperor was amnestied and Thököly's troops were guaranteed free departure from the city. However, after the opening of the city gates, General Schultz stopped respecting the conditions of the surrender.

== Court ==
General Antonio Caraffa received a power of attorney to catch and punish insurgents. He arrived to Prešov in January 1687 from Naples. He immediately ordered closing of all gates of the city. No one could escape the city anymore. He set up special tribunal, which he himself chaired, to judge the rebels.

== Execution ==
Method of the execution was unusually cruel, as a warning to other insurgents. First their arm was cut off, then head, then they were quartered. Parts of their bodies were hang on hooks along main roads and their heads were nailed to gallows.

The first judgments were handed down on 16. February. Žigmund Zimmermann, a nobleman from Prešov and a senator, became the first to be executed. He was tortured and during torture he confessed his guilt.

Another man executed was Andrej Keczer from Lipovec, who came from an old peasant family who defended the country's interests against the Viennese court at state meetings. Likewise Zimmernann, he was tortured on a vice. He had to be brought to the execution on a sleigh, because he could not stand on his feet anymore. He was said to be guilty that "by sending and receiving letters from the enemy, he was most guilty of insulting Majesty with a new sin."

František Baranay, a lower nobleman and senator of Prešov, has been imprisoned in Košice for 4 years in the past for his religious beliefs. He was tortured by the so-called Spanish boots. He was accused of helping to demolish the Franciscan monastery during the religious riots in Prešov.

Another executioned was Gabriel Pallasti, widely known by the bravery, a lower nobleman from Krušovce, who fought on the side of Thököly. After the fighting ended, he took refuge on his property, but there he was captured by imperial officers and accused of plotting a rebellion against the monarch. He was then tortured. At first they cut his hair completely, then they nailed nails used for shoeing of horses under his fingernails. Then he was tortured by fire with the so-called Italian method of torture. It consisted of stabbing hot wires into the genitals. The torture was so terrible that he confessed to things that were immediately refuted by witnesses. He was brought to the execution site almost half baked.

The executioning scaffolding, on which many innocent people had their souls released, was not demolished until November 1688.

== List of executed ==
- 5. March
1. Žigmund Zimmermann - nobleman from Prešov, senator
2. František Baranyay - lower nobleman, senator of Prešov
3. Gašpar Rauscher (1643 - 1687) - citizen of Prešov, merchant
4. Andrej Keczer from Lipovec and Pekľany - lower nobleman
- 22.March
1. Gabriel Keczer from Lipovec and Pekľany - lower nobleman, son of Andrej Keczer
2. Martin Sárossy - lower nobleman, son in law of Andrej Keczer
3. Jur Schönleb
4. Samuel Medwecki - senator
5. Jur Fleischhacker - town judge, nobleman, and merchant
- 16. April
1. Dávid Feja, judge from Košice
- 22. April
1. Andrej Székel from Veľká Ida - lower nobleman, envoy of Thököly + his two servants
2. Juraj Kováts
3. Ján Bertok
4. Gabriel Palášti - lower nobleman from Krušovce
5. Juraj Radvanský - lower nobleman; he did not survive torture, but his body was executed nevertheless
- 6. May
1. Šimon Feldmayer - former commander of Prešov defenders, he committed a suicide, but his body was executed nevertheless
- 14. May
1. Fridrich Weber - senator of Prešov
2. Juraj Bezegh - friend of Imre Thököly
3. Daniel Weber - brother of executed Friedrich Weber
4. peasant
- 12. September
1. Calvinist priest
2. N. Faszikas from Rožňava
3. butcher from Košice
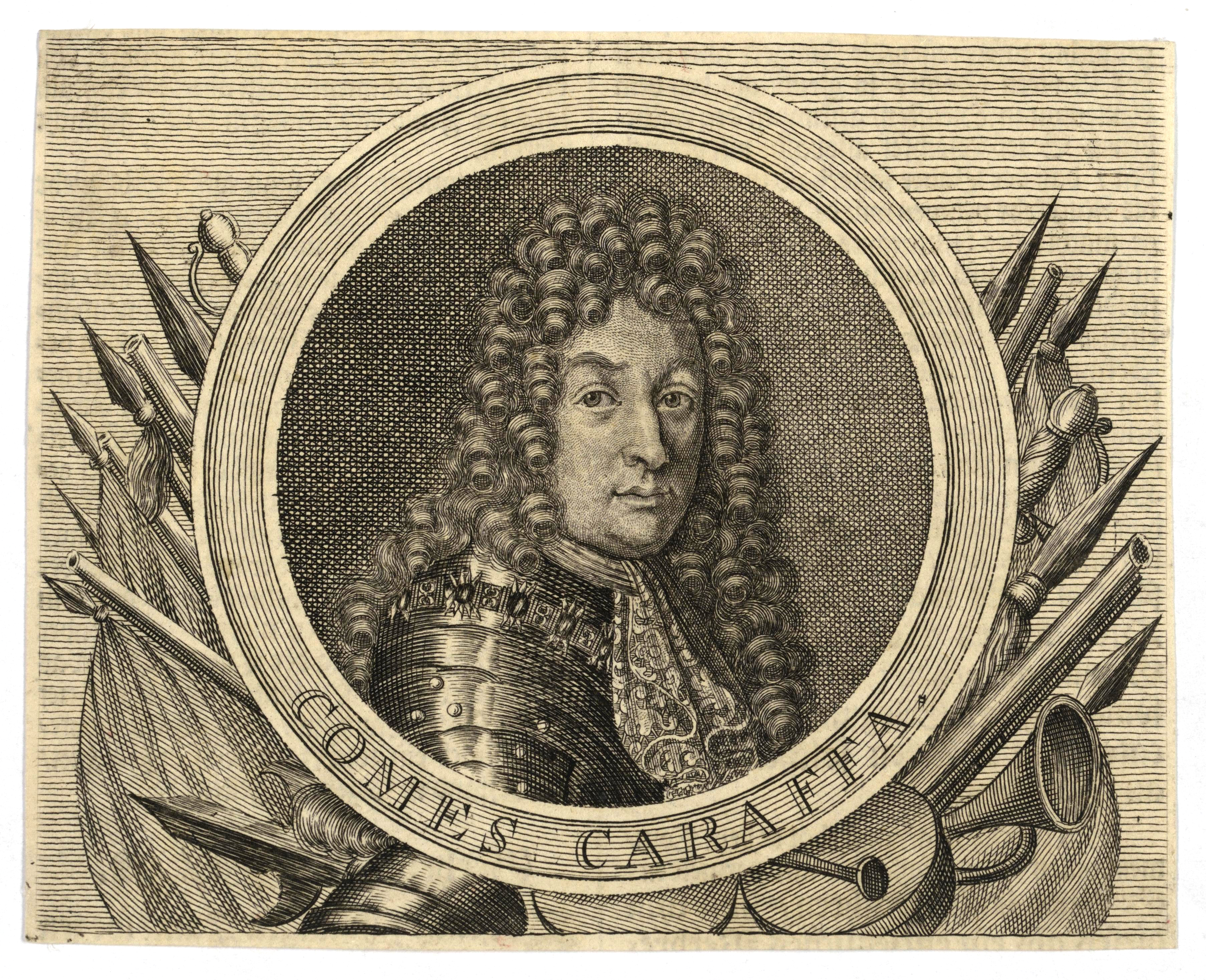
Antonio Caraffa, responsible for the Executive Court of Prešov

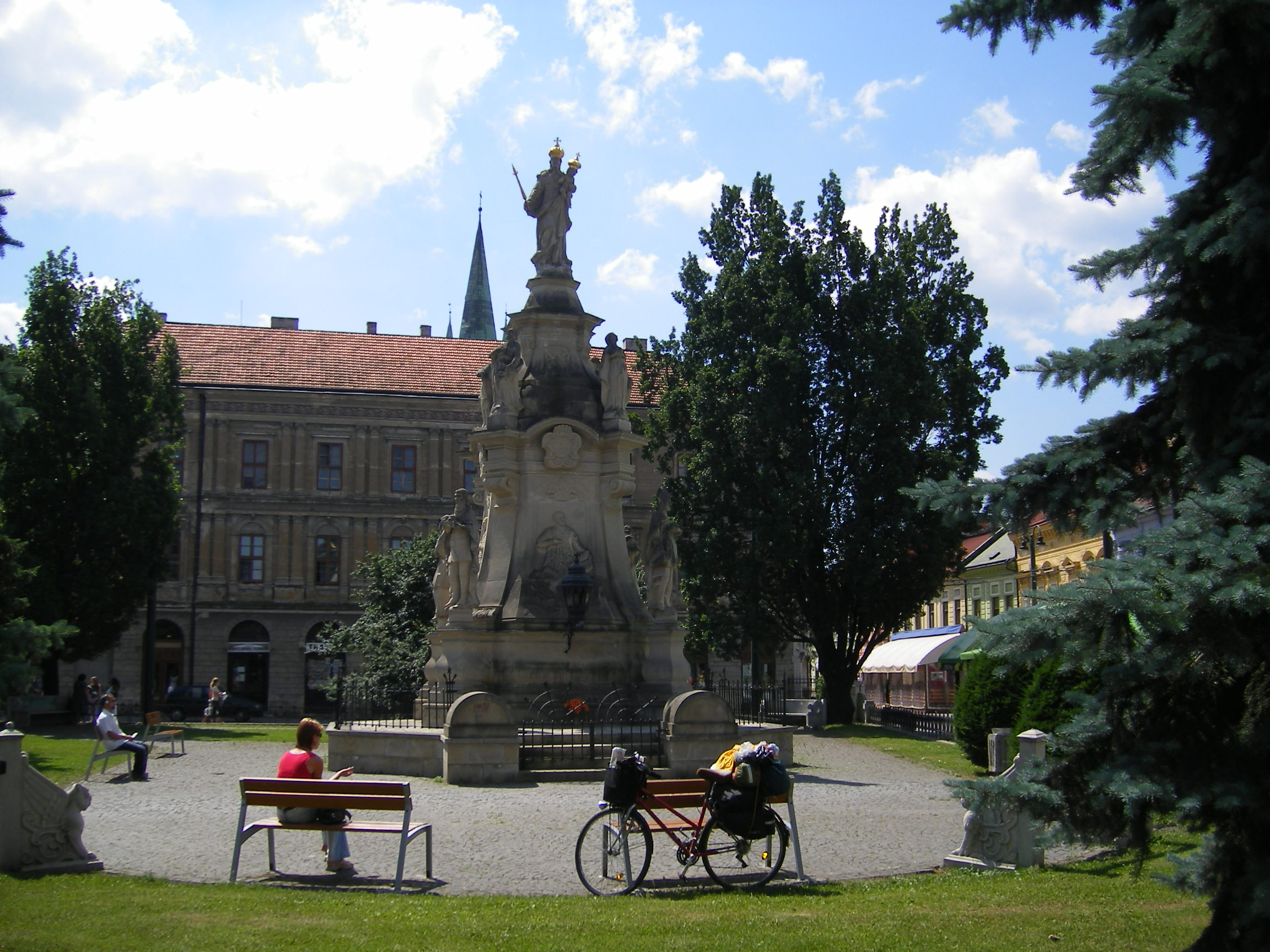
Baroque Immacualata, which was built on the place, where executions took place

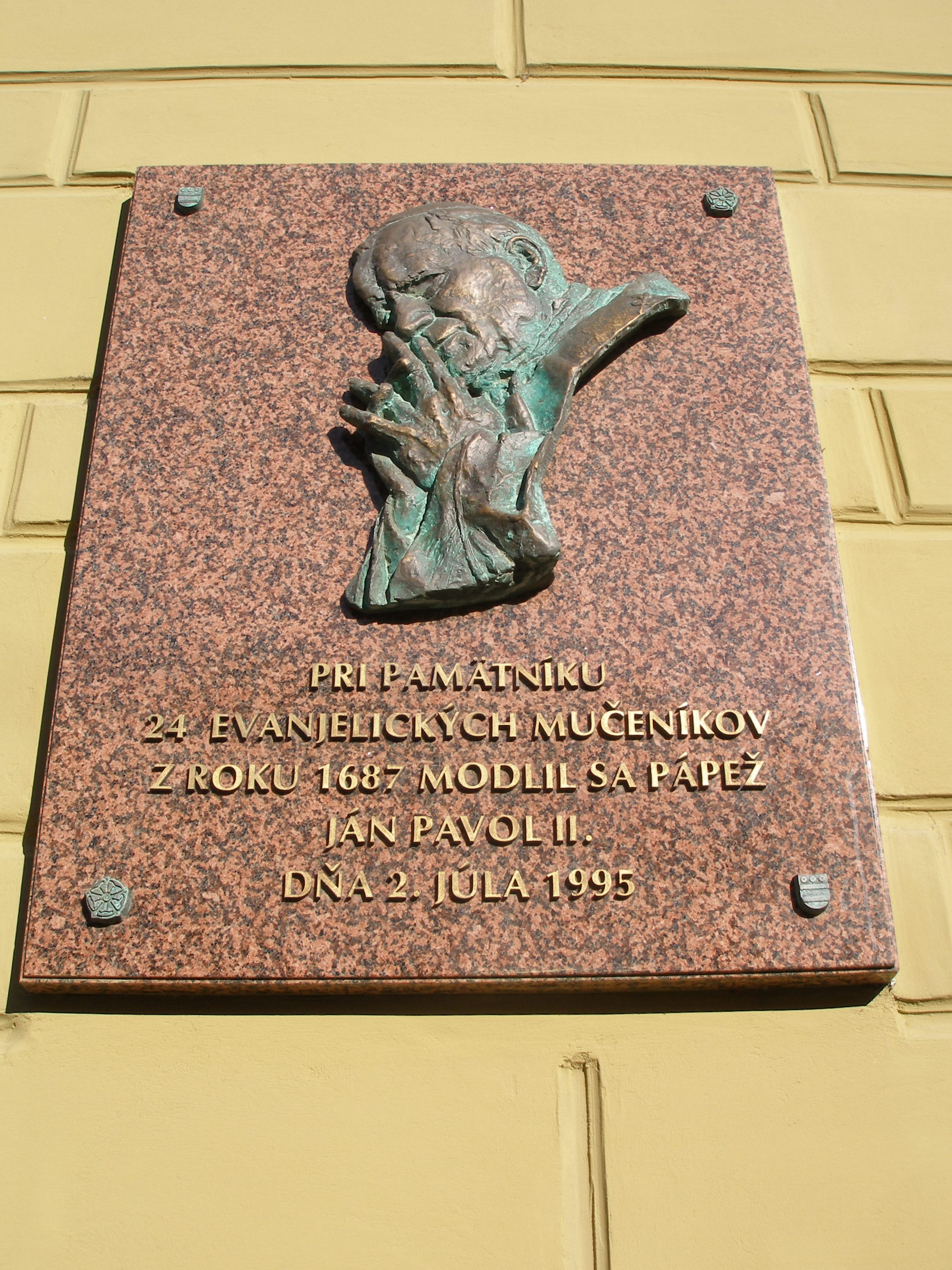
A table recalling, that in 1995 Pope John Paul II honored the memory of the executed

== Literature ==
- Johannes Rezik. Theatrum Eperiense, anno 1687 erectum, seu Laniena Eperiensis. Liptovský Mikuláš: Tranoscius, 1931. Translated by Gustáv Pogány (Slovak)
- Holák, J.: Beda odsúdeným, Osveta, Bratislava, 1974 (Slovak)
- Dangl, Vojtech: Slovensko vo víre stavovských povstaní, Slovenské predagogické nakladateľstvo, 1986 (Slovak)
- K. Papp Miklós: Caraffa és az eperjesi vértörvényszék, 1870 (Hungarian)
- Bidner Ákos: Az eperjesi vértörvényszék, 1941 (Hungarian)
- Mayer Endre: Az eperjesi vértanúk kivégeztetése, 1908 (Hungarian)
