= Donat John, Count Heissler of Heitersheim =

Donat John Count Heissler of Heitersheim
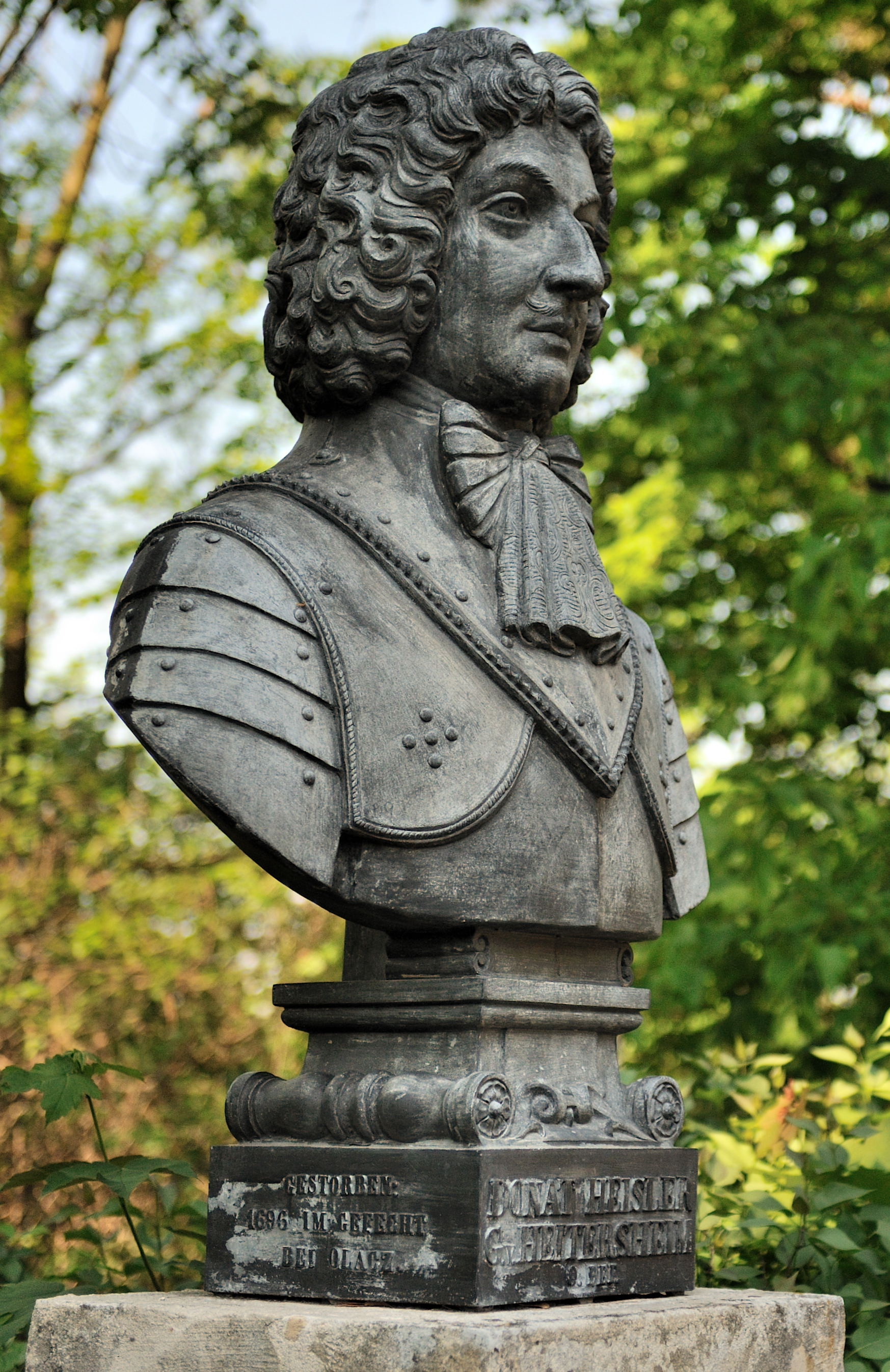
- Born: c. 1648
- Died: 1 September 1696; Szeged, Hungary

Donat John Count Heissler of Heitersheim was an Imperial and Royal Marshal of the Habsburg empire. He was deeply involved in the conflict between the Austrian and Turkish empires. He was born in 1648 and died at Szeged on 1 September 1696.

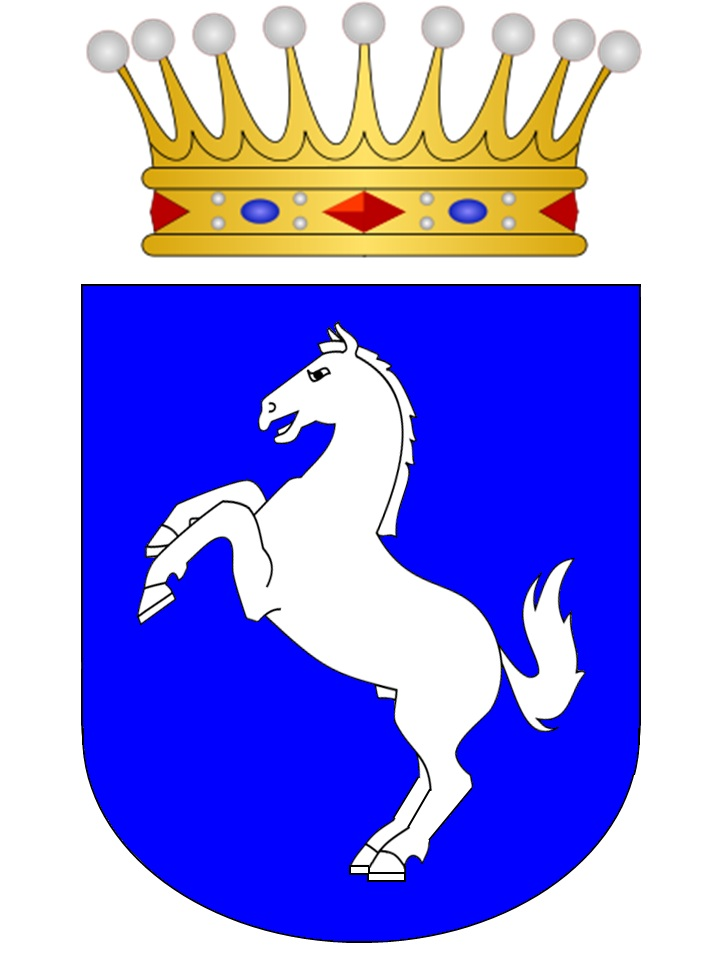
The coat of arms Count Heissler of Heitersheim

== Biography ==
Donat John Heissler was born in the Holy Roman Empire in about 1648, at the end of the Thirty Years' War. He enlisted in the service of the Habsburgs at a very young age, and as a cavalry captain, Heissler obtained the rank of knight on 15 September 1678. His courage and exemplary behaviour led to his promotion to colonel and command over a regiment of dragoons, which is named after him.

He fought bravely in the Battle of Vienna in 1683 and continued to distinguish himself in battle over the following years. In 1684 he defeated rebels commanded by Imre Thököly, followed by a victory over a Turkish regiment at Székesfehérvár. In 1684 he relieved Vác, subjugated Arad and defeated Turkish forces, which were defending Oradea and Gyula.

On 16 September 1685, he was promoted to the rank of general and in his first expedition prevented the conquering of Munkács and Ofen, and defeated the Turks at Szeged. In 1688 he crushed Imre Thökölu at Körös, seized Požarevac (Passarowitz) and distinguished himself at Belgrade.

Having been appointed Lieutenant-general on 4 January 1689, his luck ran out in 1690. His imperial troops and the supporting Transylvanian army were defeated by troops of Imre Thököly at the battle of Zernest (Zărneşti-Tohani) on 21 August 1690. His ally, count Mihály Teleki was killed in action. Heissler was captured by Thököly, and offered to the Emperor in exchange for countess Ilona Zrínyi, the wife of Imre Thököly, who was being kept in an imperial prison. It took two years to negotiate the exchange. In 1692, the deal was closed: Heissler was released, and the countess joined her husband in Turkey.

On 9 February 1692, immediately after his release, he was promoted to the rank of General of the Cavalry and proved that his courage had not been affected by his imprisonment, by seizing the town of Oradea on 5 June. From 1694 until 1695 he took command of the main Hungarian forces on an interim basis. On 12 May 1696, he obtained the supreme rank of Marshal.

Although it is unknown when he was awarded the title of Baron, it is known that he used it in official documents in which he bought the Písečné property and Uherčice castle.

He was elevated to the rank of Count, a title he kept until he died on 1 September 1696 from the consequences of a wound he received 5 days before in the Battle of Ulaş near Timișoara. The "Register of Generals of the Imperial and Royal Army died on the Field of Honor" lists him as "Donat John Count Heissler of Heitersheim, Marshal Imperial and Royal".

== A lover of castles ==
=== Uherčice ===
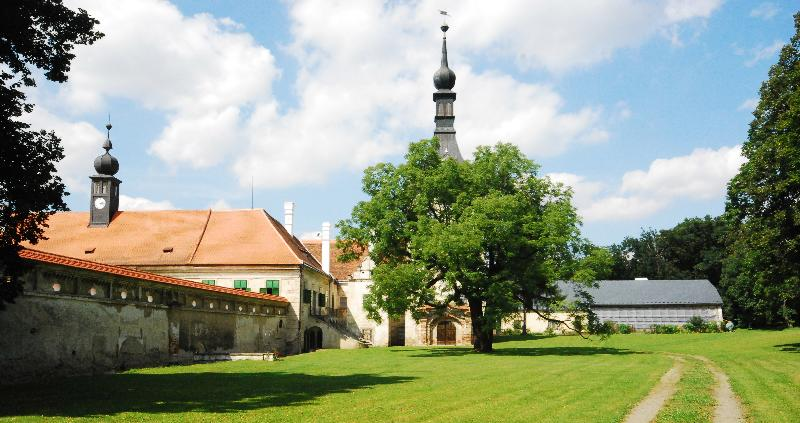
Uherčice castel

Heissler of Heitersheim acquired the castle of Uherčice and added to its embellishment. His modifications gave a more baroque aspect to the castle, thanks to the involvement of the architect Francesco Martinelli. Under the aegis of the Count, Baldassarre Fontana created the very beautiful decoration in stucco in the chapel and several rooms.

=== Písečné ===
He also acquired the Písečné Castle at the same time.

== Descent ==
Donat John, Count Heissler of Heitersheim married Barbara Maria Countess of Rotthal (becoming Barbara Maria Countess Heissler of Heitersheim). They had two sons together:

=== Francis Joseph Count Heissler of Heitersheim ===
He married May 29, 1713 in Prague, Maria Anna Countess of Mittrowitz, Member of the Order of the Starry Cross. They had four daughters:

- Maria Theresia Carolina Maximiliana Countess Heissler of Heitersheim († 14.08.1759) married (30.05.1709) Count Maximilian Joseph Mittrovsky of Mitrowitz Baron of Nemyssl (* 30.05.1709 - † 01.18.1782). From this union was born Johann Nepomuk Count Mittrowsky of Mittrowitz (* 20.01. 1757 Brno - † 05.20.1799 in Brno). He is a direct ancestor of the conductor Nikolaus Harnoncourt (Nikolaus of LaFontaine Count of Harnoncourt-Unverzagt)
- Johanna Countess Heissler of Heitersheim married (1741) Charles-Gabriel Baron of Canon and of the Holy Roman Empire, called Marquess of Ville, Lord of Brick in Silesia, Chamberlain of his Imperial and Royal Majesty, general Major commanding Debretchin.
- Anna Maria Countess Heissler of Heitersheim
- Maria Judith Countess Heissler of Heitersheim married Jean-Baptiste Joyeuse (* 11.25.1699 - † 18.09 1765) - Field Marshal.

Francis Joseph Count Heissler of Heitersheimacquires Qualkowitz in 1702 which he resells in 1718. He also sells the Píesling property to Count Anton von Hartig. Francis Joseph had also a brilliant career as a member of the Geheimrat then as royal judge of the Land from 1732, to finally become governor of Moravia in 1740.

=== Bernard of Heissler ===
second son of the count, led from 1705 the Regiment founded by Donat John.

== Sources ==
- Wilhelm Edler von Janko (1880). "Heißler von Heitersheim, Donat Johann, Graf" . Allgemeine Deutsche Biographie (in German). Vol. 11. Leipzig: Duncker & Humblot. pp. 671–672.
- Mährischer Adel, p. 44
- François-Alexandre Aubert de La Chesnaye Des Bois: Dictionnaire généalogique, héraldique, chronologique et historique, p. 383 (in French)
