= Upper Hungary =

Historic Hungarian region, now mostly in Slovakia

Coordinates: 49.0000°N 19.0000°E

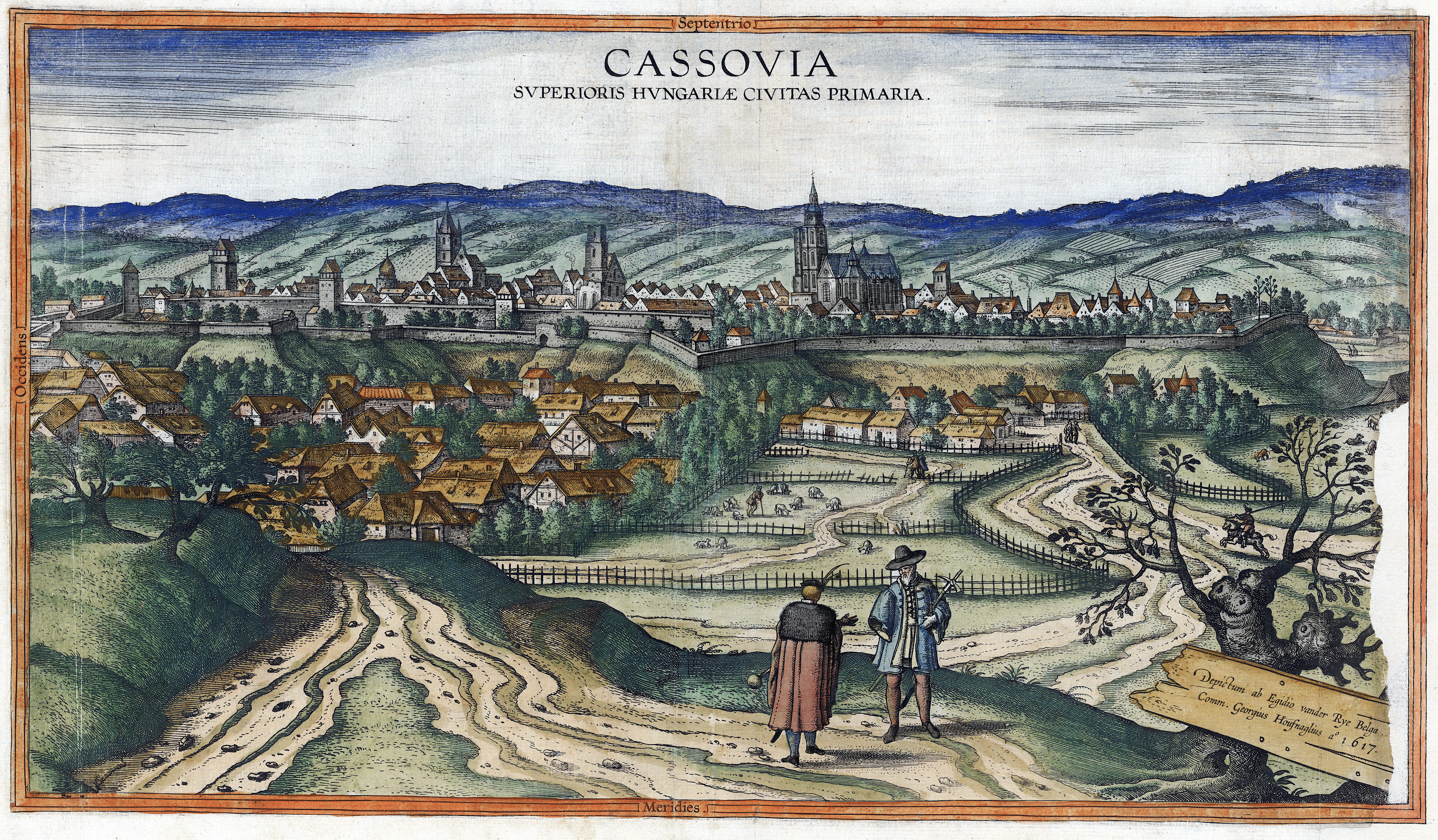
A 1617 prospect of Cassovia (Slovak: Košice; Hungarian: Kassa) from the Civitates orbis terrarum. It is described as Upper Hungary's principal city (civitas primaria).

Upper Hungary (Hungarian: Felvidék, lit. 'Upland'; Slovak: Horná zem, Horný vidiek, or Horniaky) is a historical region that was the northern part of the Kingdom of Hungary and is now mostly a part of modern Slovakia. The region has also been called Felső-Magyarország (lit. 'Upper Hungary'; Slovak: Horné Maďarsko). However, the Slovaks use the term Horné Uhorsko 'Upper Hungary', with the term Hungary having no connection to the "land of the Magyars" etymology.

During the Habsburg–Ottoman wars (1526–1791), Upper Hungary meant only the northeastern parts of the Hungarian Kingdom. The northwestern regions (present-day western and central Slovakia) belonged to "Lower Hungary". Sometime during the 18th or 19th century, Upper Hungary began to imply the whole northern regions of the kingdom.

The population of Upper Hungary was multiethnic and mainly consisted of Slovaks and Hungarians but also Germans, Ashkenazi Jews, and Ruthenians. The first complex demographic data of the region are from the 18th century, in which Slovaks constituted the majority of the population. Slovaks called this territory Slovensko (Slovakia), a term that appears in written documents as early as the 15th century, but it was not precisely defined, and the region inhabited by Slovaks held no distinct legal, constitutional, or political status within Upper Hungary.

== Etymology ==
=== Historical usage ===
Historically there are different meanings:

1. The older Hungarian term Felső-Magyarország (literally: "Upper Hungary"; Slovak: Horné Uhorsko; German: Oberungarn; Ukrainian: Верхня Угорщина; Russian: Верхняя Венгрия) formally referred to what is today Slovakia in the 16th-18th centuries and informally to all the northern parts of the Kingdom of Hungary in the 19th century.
2. The Hungarian Felvidék (literally: "Upper Country", "Upland", "Highland", or perhaps more accurately "Upper Landscape" or "Upper Countryside"; Slovak: Horná zem; German: Oberland; Yiddish: אױבערלאַנד) has had several informal meanings:
  - In the parts of the 18th century and throughout the 19th century, it was usually used:
    - to denote the mountainous northern part of the Kingdom of Hungary as opposed to the southern lowlands
    - more generally, to denote regions or territories situated at a higher altitude than the settlement of the speaker
    - as a synonym for the then-meaning of Felső-Magyarország
  - After World War I, the meaning in Hungarian was restricted to Slovakia and Carpathian Ruthenia, and after World War II to Slovakia only. At the same time, the word felvidék remains a common Hungarian noun applied to areas at higher elevations, e.g., Balaton-felvidék, a hilly region and national park adjacent to Lake Balaton.

=== Modern usage ===
After World War I, the meaning of Felvidék in Hungarian (Felső-Magyarország was not used anymore) was restricted to the Slovak and Carpathian Ruthenian parts of Czechoslovakia. Today the term Felvidék is sometimes used in Hungary when speaking about Slovakia, and it is exclusively (and anachronistically) used in Hungarian historical literature when speaking about the Middle Ages, i.e., before the name actually came into existence. The three counties of the region that remained in Hungary after World War I, however, are never called Upper Hungary today, only Northern Hungary (Észak-Magyarország). Any use of the word Felvidék to denote all of modern Slovakia is considered offensive by Slovaks, and inappropriate by some Hungarians, but it is now commonly used by the sizeable Hungarian minority in the southern border-zone of Slovakia to identify the Hungarian-majority areas where they live. Some of them call themselves felvidéki magyarok, i.e. the "Upland Hungarians." The word felvidék is also used as a component of the toponym Balaton-felvidék, describing the hilly area north of Lake Balaton, with no connection to the historical Upper Hungary.

== History ==
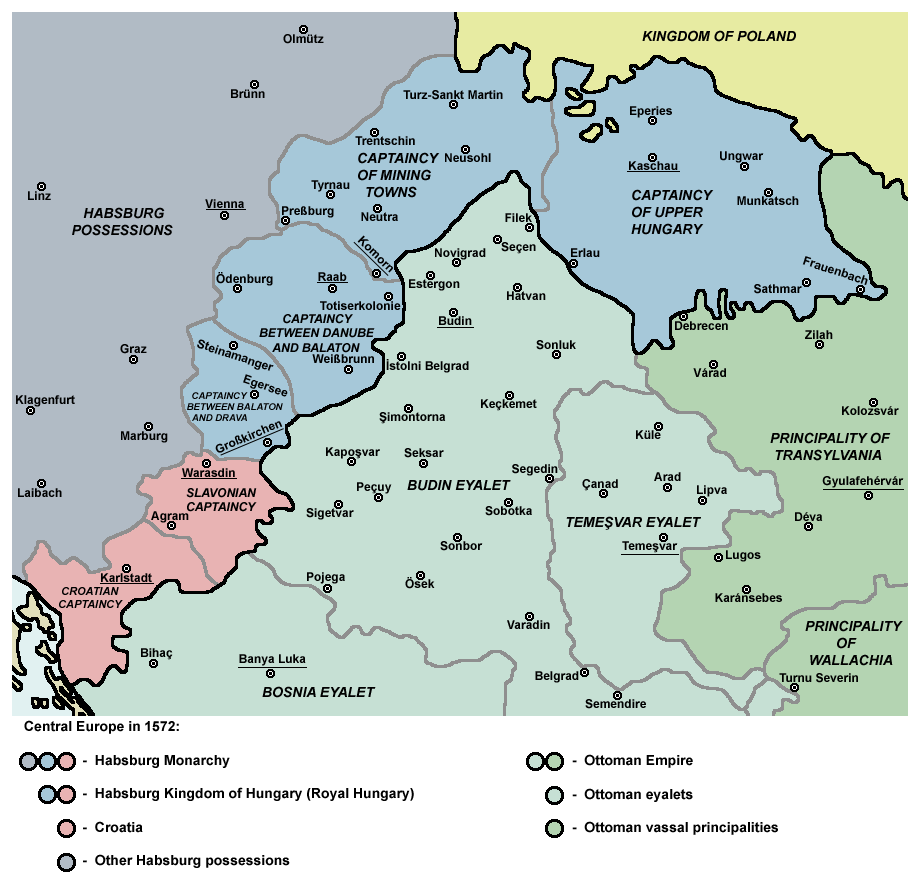
Captaincy of Upper Hungary in 1572

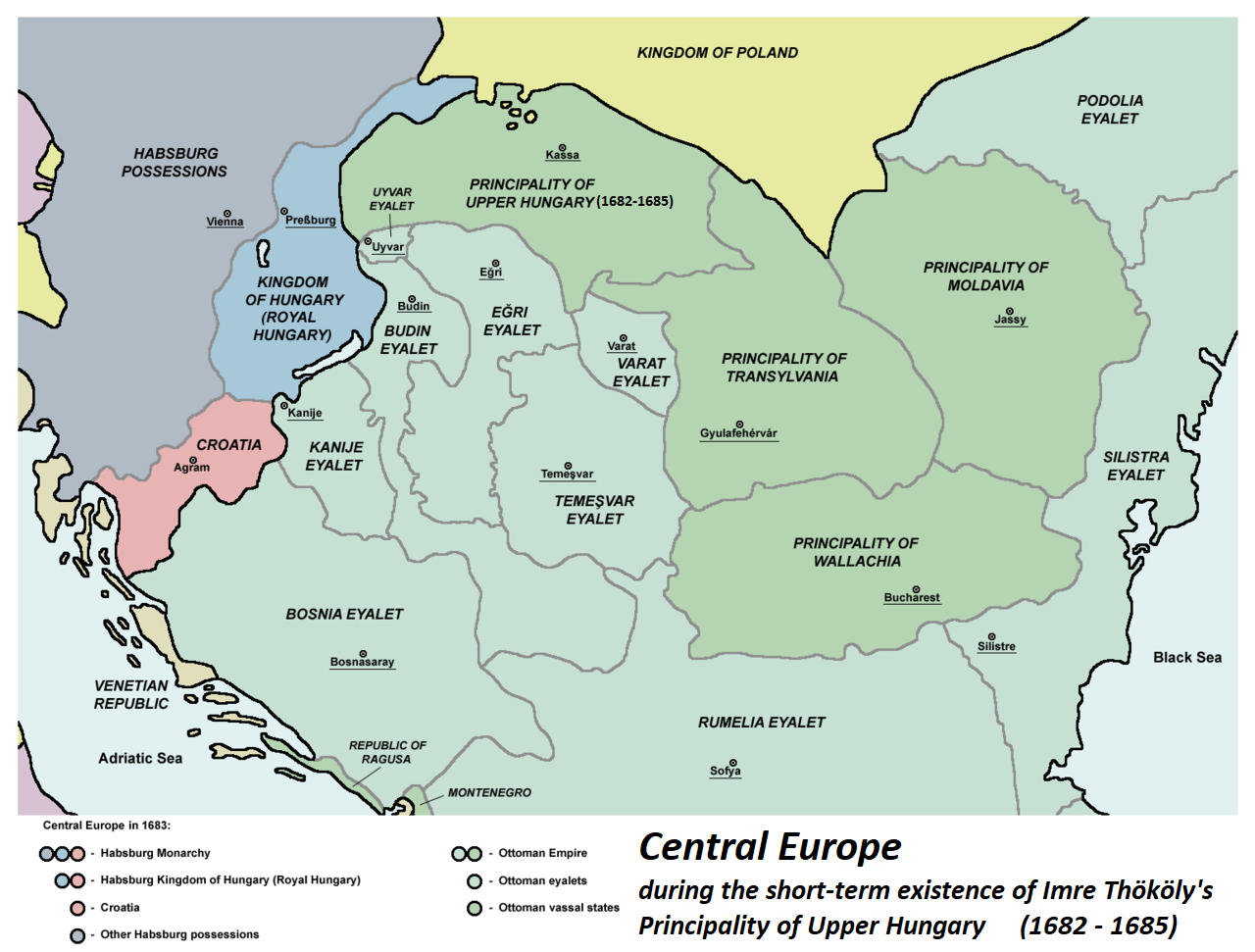
Principality of Upper Hungary in 1683

=== Middle Ages ===
The term Upper Hungary often occurs in publications on history as a somewhat-anachronistic translation of other, earlier (then Latin) designations denoting approximately the same territory. Some of the other terms were Partes Danubii septentrionales (Territories to the north of the Danube) or Partes regni superiores (Upper parts of the Kingdom). The actual name "Upper Hungary" arose later from the latter phrase.

In the 15th century, the "Somorja (Šamorín), Nagyszombat (Trnava), Galgóc (Hlohovec), Nyitra (Nitra), Léva (Levice), Losonc (Lučenec), Rimaszombat (Rimavská Sobota), Rozsnyó (Rožňava), Jászó (Jasov), Kassa (Košice), Gálszécs (Sečovce), Nagymihály (Michalovce)" line was the northern "boundary" of the Hungarian ethnic area.

==== Affiliation to Hungary ====
The Principality of Nitra emerged in the 8th century and developed into an independent Slavic state; although the polity may have lost its independence when it was still at the stage of development. In the early 9th century, the polity was situated on the north-western territories of present-day Slovakia.

=== 16th–17th centuries ===
The term emerged approximately after the conquest of today's Hungary by the Ottomans in the 16th century when Felső-Magyarország (German: Oberungarn; Slovak: Horné Uhorsko) referred to present-day eastern Slovakia and the adjacent territories of today's Hungary and Ukraine that were not occupied by the Ottoman Empire. That territory formed a separate military district (the "Captaincy of Upper Hungary" (1564–1686) headquartered in Kassa/Kaschau/Košice) within Royal Hungary. At that time, present-day western Slovakia, and sometimes also the remaining territories of Royal Hungary to the south of it, were called Lower Hungary (Hungarian: Alsó-Magyarország; German: Niederungarn; Slovak: Dolné Uhorsko).

It was briefly a separate vassal state of the Ottoman Empire under Imre Thököly in the 1680s.

This usage occurs in many texts up to around 1800 – for example, the renowned mining school of Schemnitz/Selmecbánya/Banská Štiavnica in present-day central Slovakia was founded in "Lower" Hungary (not in "Upper" Hungary) in the 18th century and Pozsony (today's Bratislava) was also referred to as being in "Lower" Hungary in the late 18th century.

=== 18th century – early 20th century ===
From the 18th century (in many texts however only after around 1800) until 1920, the territory of the Kingdom of Hungary north of the Tisza and the Danube, which comprised present-day Slovakia, Carpathian Ruthenia, and approximately the Northern Hungary region (Borsod-Abaúj-Zemplén, Heves, and Nógrád Counties), was informally called either "Upper Hungary" or "Upland" (Felső-Magyarország or Felvidék). Although not strictly defined, the name Felvidék became commonplace to the point that at least one publication concerning the area used it as its title. Other nations used the terms "Upper Hungary" (for the northern part of the Kingdom), "Slovakia" (only for the territory predominantly inhabited by the Slovaks), and "Ruthenia" (the territory predominantly inhabited by the Ruthenians) in parallel. The Slovaks themselves called the territories of the Kingdom of Hungary to the south of Slovakia Dolná zem ("Lower Land").

In the course of the creation of Czechoslovakia at the end of World War I, Czechoslovakia originally demanded that all of Upper Hungary be added to Czechoslovak territory (i.e. including the territory between the Tisza River and present-day Slovakia). The claim for its acquisition, however, was not based on the whole area having a single common name, "Upper Hungary", but on the presence of a Slovak minority in the region.

== Demographics ==
=== Population in the 18th century ===
In 1720 of the 63 largest towns on the territory of present-day Slovakia with at least 100 taxpaying households 40 had Slovak majority, 14 German and 9 Hungarian majority.

=== Population in the 19th century ===
The first ethnic data of whole Hungarian Kingdom by county was published in 1842. According to this survey the total population of the counties in Upper Hungary exceeded 2.4 million, with the following ethnic distribution: 59.5% Slovaks, 22% Magyars, 8.3% Ruthenians, 6.7% Germans and 3.6% Jews.

=== Population in the 20th century ===
Upper Hungary included the counties of Pozsony, Nyitra, Bars, Hont, Trencsén, Turóc, Árva, Liptó, Zólyom, Gömör és Kis-Hont, Szespes, Abaúj-Torna, Sáros and Zemplén. In the last census of 1910 in the Kingdom of Hungary, which was based on native language, Slovak speakers were a majority in many of these counties.

== See also ==
- Carpathian Germans
- Oberlander Jews
- Felvidék national football team
