= Battle of Olasch =

Battle in the Great Turkish War

- Part of Great Turkish War
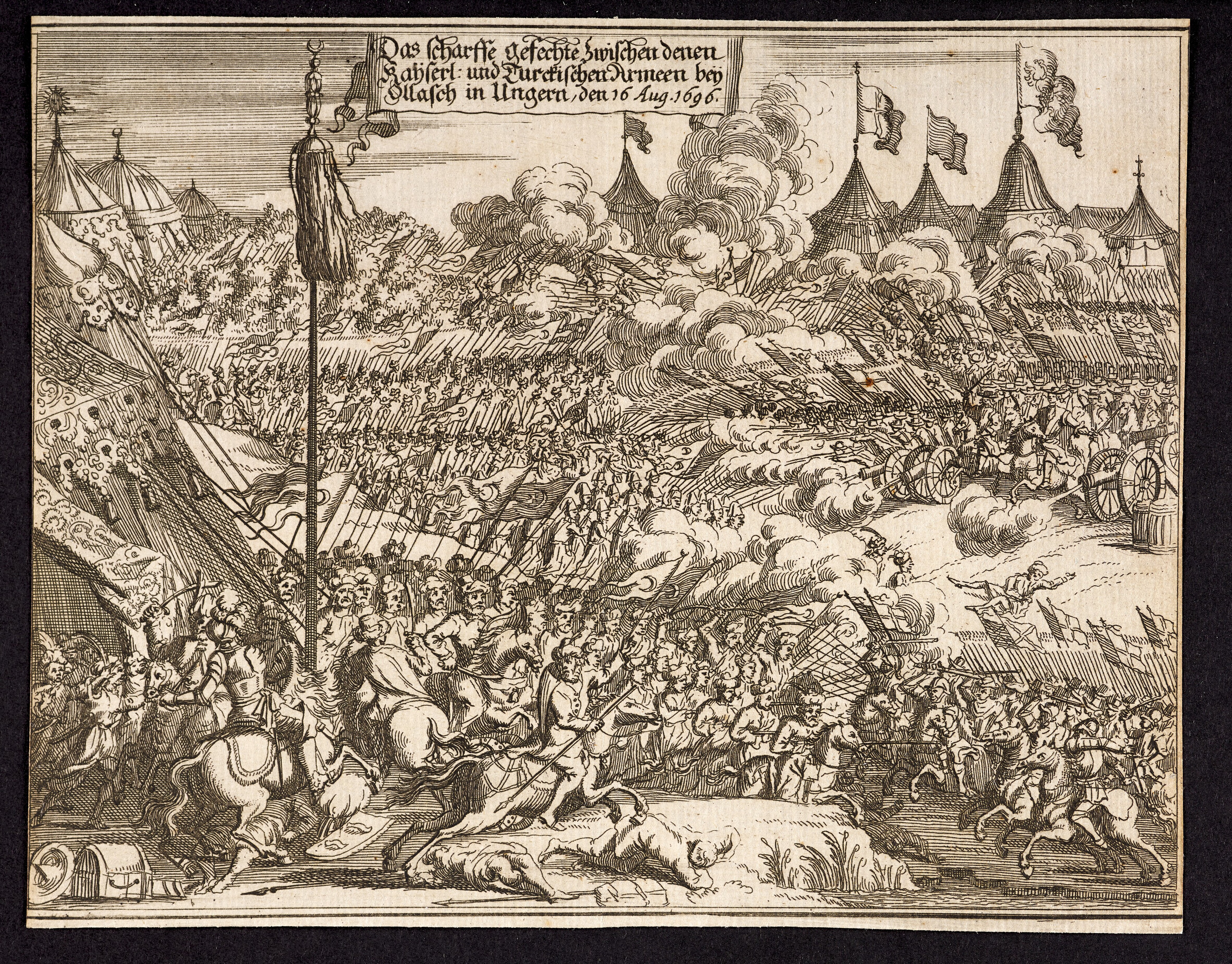
- The Battle of Olasch
Date	26 August 1696
Location	near the Bega River, Ottoman Empire 45°39′25″N 20°47′17″E
Result	Ottoman victory (see Aftermath section)

Belligerents
Holy Roman Empire	Ottoman Empire

Commanders and leaders
(Holy Roman Empire) Augustus II the Strong (Holy Roman Empire) General Heissler † (Note: "General Heissler was killed in an indecisive battle on the Bega")	Mustafa II; Elmas Mehmed Pasha

Strength
38,000 men (Note: “Augustus’s forces was reduced to 38,000 before the battle.“)	60,000 men

Casualties and losses
3,000–6,000 killed or wounded (Note: “Augustus assessed his losses at 3,000 dead and wounded“)	4,000
- Location within Serbia Battle of Olasch (Romania)

The Battle of Olasch (also Ólas, Ulaş, Olaschin) took place after a Habsburg Imperial army led by Saxon Elector General, Augustus II the Strong, laid siege to Turkish held Temesvár. On 26 August 1696, after learning that Sultan Mustafa II's relief army was crossing the Danube at Pancsova, Augustus gave up the siege and headed to meet the Ottoman army. The battle near the Bega River resulted in a draw after both armies retreated with heavy casualties on both sides. Strategically, the Ottoman army's campaign can be considered a success, as it achieved its goal of retaining Temesvár.

== Battle ==
The battle of Olasch started late in the day, around five in the evening. During the battle, the left wing of the Imperial army took heavy casualties, in contrast to the centre and the right-wing that had the better of the action. At night the fighting stopped and the next day both armies withdrew from the battlefield. The Imperial commander Heissler of Heitersheim was wounded or died days later after the battle. 3,000 Habsburg soldiers killed or wounded. The Turks lost 4,000 men.

== Aftermath ==
The battle ended in a tactical draw, however, after Augustus is compelled to lift the siege of Temesvár, the Sultan claimed victory and was thus able to achieve operational success. According to historian Tony Sharp it is hard to come up with any other result for the battle than a scoredraw, (Note: “Sutton reported that ‘all that write from the army’ maintained that ‘the Imperialists had given the enemy an entire rout had they not wanted daylight’.“) British historian Robert William Seton-Watson called it an "indecisive battle", while according to the Encyclopædia Metropolitana, the encyclopedic work published from 1817 to 1845, "the Turks claimed the victory though no decided advantage accrued to either side".

The imperial army took over the Bega and united with the separate corps at Titel. As early as the autumn of 1696, Augustus resigned from his position and went home to obtain the royal throne of Poland after the death of John Sobieski. The same year, Emperor Leopold appointed the brilliant young military strategist Prince Eugene of Savoy, who had returned from the Rhine front, as the new commander-in-chief. On 11 September 1697, a greatly outnumbered Imperial army led by Prince Eugene faced the Turks at Zenta on the Tisza which resulted in the Ottoman Empire's greatest defeats.

== Sources ==
- Sharp, T. (2001). Pleasure and Ambition: The Life, Loves and Wars of Augustus the Strong. I.B.Tauris. ISBN 978-0-85771-571-5.
- Seton-Watson, R.W. A History of the Roumanians. The University Press.
- Encyclopaedia; Smedley, E. (1845). Encyclopædia metropolitana by E. Smedley, Hugh J. Rose and Henry J. Rose. p. 666.
- Uyar, M.; Erickson, E.J. (2009). A Military History of the Ottomans: From Osman to Atatürk. Praeger Security International/ABC-CLIO. ISBN 978-0-275-98876-0.
- Mikaberidze, A. (2011). Conflict and Conquest in the Islamic World: A Historical Encyclopedia. ABC-CLIO. ISBN 978-1-59884-337-8.
- Dyer, T.H. (1864). The History of Modern Europe from the Fall of Constantinople: In 1453, to the War in the Crimea, in 1857. J. Murray.
- von Poten, B. (1878). Handwörterbuch der gesamten Militärwissenschaften: Krieg von 1866 in Deutschland bis Militär-Konvention (in German). Velhagen & Klasing.
- Charles W. Ingrao (2000). The Habsburg Monarchy, 1618–1815. Cambridge University Press. ISBN 978-1-107-26869-2.
