= Úherčice =

- Municipality
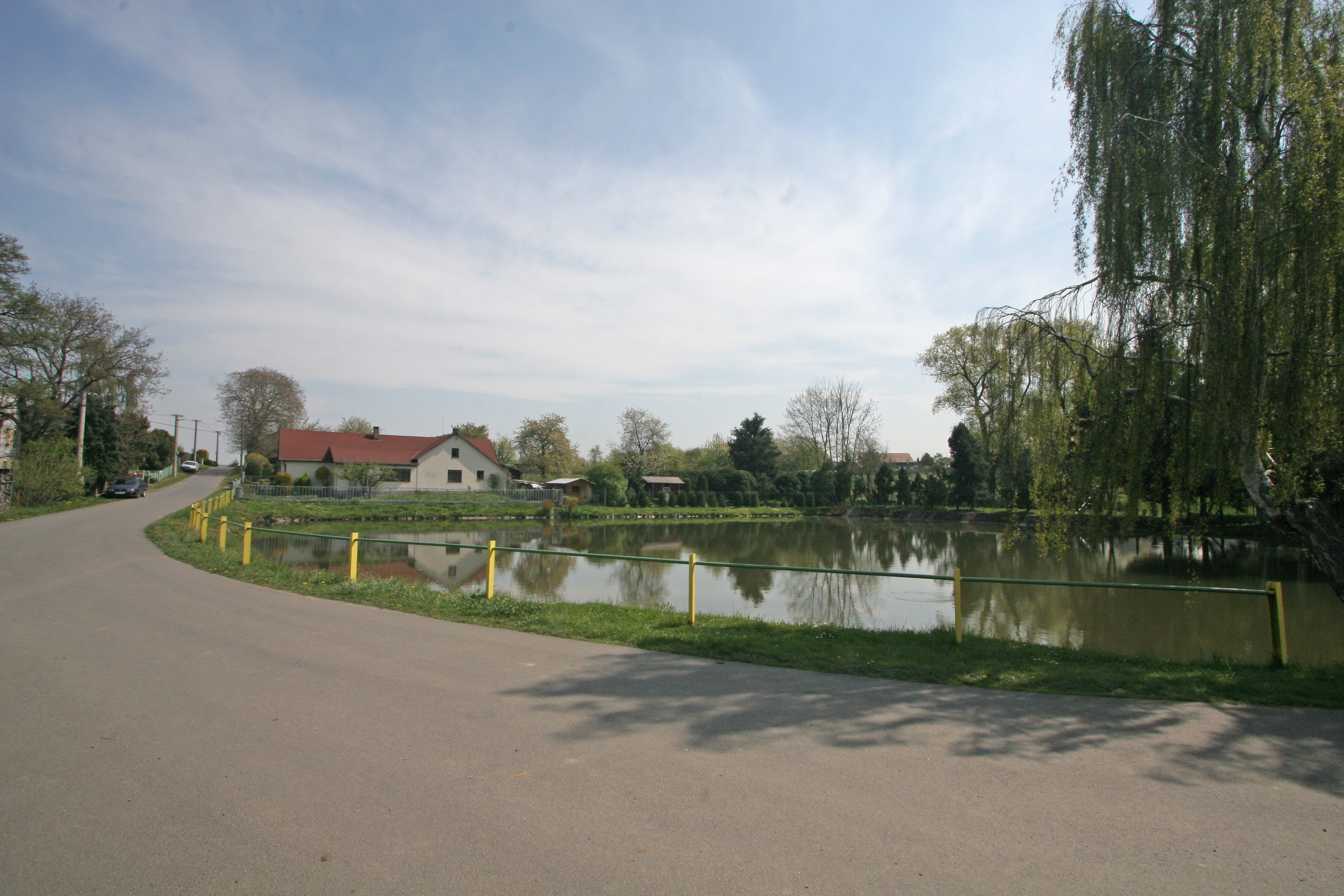
- Pond in the centre of Úherčice

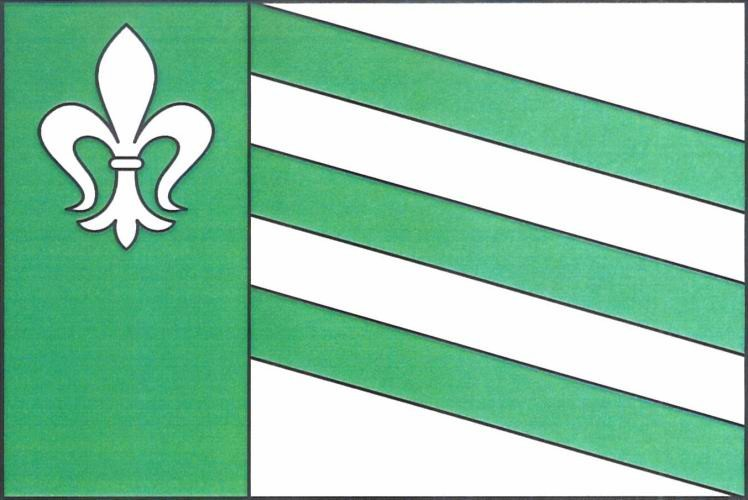
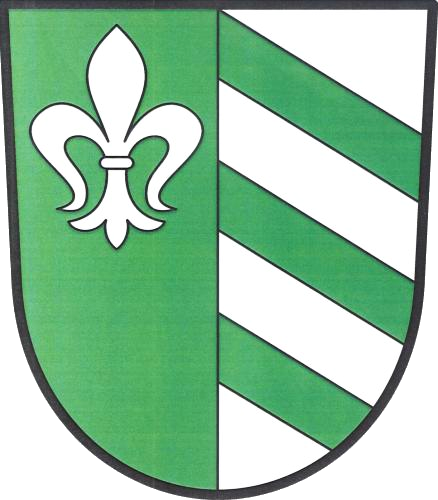
- Flag Coat of arms

- Location in the Czech Republic
- Coordinates: 49°55′3″N 15°40′57″E
- Country: Czech Republic
- Region: Pardubice
- District: Chrudim
- First mentioned: 1392

Area
  - Total: 2.89 km^{2} (1.12 sq mi)
- Elevation: 394 m (1,293 ft)

Population (2026-01-01)
  - Total: 131
  - Density: 45.3/km^{2} (117/sq mi)
- Time zone: UTC+1 (CET)
  - Summer (DST): UTC+2 (CEST)
- Postal code: 538 03
- Website: www.uhercice.com

Úherčice is a municipality and village in Chrudim District in the Pardubice Region of the Czech Republic. It has about 100 inhabitants.

== History ==
The first written mention of Úherčice is from 1392.

== Demographics ==
Historical population
Year	Pop.	±%
1869	234	—
1880	270	+15.4%
1890	279	+3.3%
1900	270	−3.2%
1910	259	−4.1%
1921	241	−6.9%
1930	221	−8.3%
1950	173	−21.7%
1961	177	+2.3%
1970	162	−8.5%
1980	138	−14.8%
1991	110	−20.3%
2001	102	−7.3%
2011	120	+17.6%
2021	140	+16.7%
Source: Censuses
