= Captaincies of the Kingdom of Hungary =

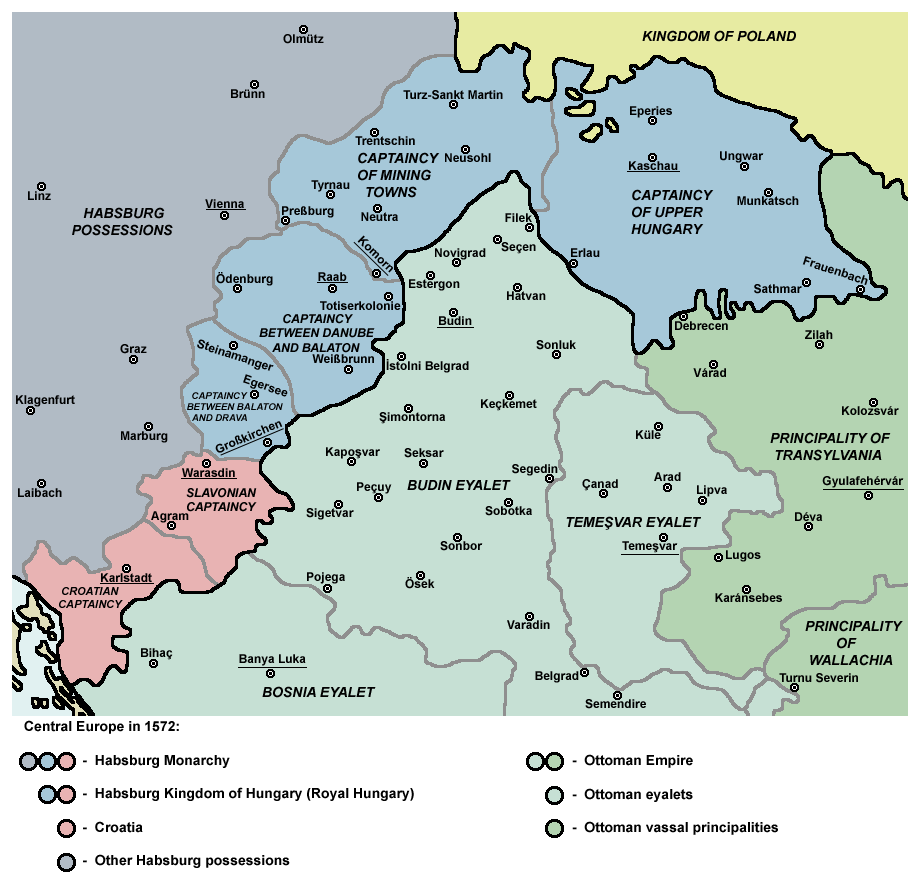
Captaincies of Kingdom of Hungary around 1572.

The Captaincies of the Kingdom of Hungary (Hungarian: Magyar királyi főkapitányságok) were administrative divisions, military districts in the 16th and 17th centuries. The Ottoman Empire meant a constant threat to the kingdom, therefore the Habsburg Hungarian kings needed to establish a well-working military administration. The captaincy (főkapitányság) was administered by the Royal Captain-general of the Captaincy.

In 1542, the Hungarian kingdom, primarily for military and administrative purposes, was divided into two captaincies, Captaincy of Cisdanubia (mostly Upper Hungary) and Captaincy of Transdanubia (the remaining territories). Captaincy of Győr was founded in 1556. In 1563 Captaincy of Lower Hungary was established (today approx. the present-day regions of western and central Slovakia). By 1566, Kanizsa at southwestern Transdanubia also evolved into a new captaincy.

Irrespective of the military districts, there were coexistent superior (nemesi – noble) captaincies, with their own captain-generals, however their role was different (organization of insurrectio, logistics etc.).

== Superior (nemesi – noble) captaincies ==
- Captaincy of Cisdanubia (from 1542)
- Captaincy of Transdanubia (from 1542)
- Captaincy of Upper Hungary (superior) (from 1554?)
- Captaincy of Croatia-Slavonia

== Captaincies ==
=== Captaincy of Győr ===
The Captaincy of Győr (also called Duna-Balaton Köz) was located mainly at the western parts of Kingdom of Hungary (the territories between lake Balaton and river Danube). The captaincy was established in 1556, because of newly arisen military and administrative concerns, though it formally worked as a separate district from 1554. Its seat was in town of Győr. In 1594, the Ottomans captured Győr, however the united armies reconquered it in 1598.

=== Captaincy of Kanizsa ===
The Captaincy of Kanizsa or Captaincy of Balaton-Drávaköz was established in 1566. Its territory was situated mainly between the Lake Balaton and River Drava. Initially, the main military center of the southern territories was in Szigetvár, however, in 1566 the town fell to the Turks. The seat got to the newly formed captaincy of Kanizsa. In 1600 Kanizsa also fell. In 1607 Körmend became the new center of the reorganized captaincy.

=== Captaincy of Lower Hungary ===
The Captaincy of Lower Hungary (Alsó-Magyarországi in Hungarian, also called Bányavárosok, Bányavidék and Dunán-innen) was established in 1563 as Article of 16 of 1563 stipulated. Its territory was located mainly at the region of present-day western and central Slovakia. Its headquarter was in Nyitra (now Nitra), and later, in accordance with the military situation, in Surány (now Šurany) (from 1568 to 1581), Léva (now Levice) (from 1581 to 1589), Érsekújvár (now Nové Zámky) (from 1589 to 1663) and from 1663 in Komárom (Komárno).

=== Captaincy of Upper Hungary ===
The Captaincy of Upper Hungary (Hungarian: Felső-Magyarországi Főkapitányság or Kassai Főkapitányság) was located mainly at the northeastern parts of Kingdom of Hungary (mainly present-day eastern Slovakia, Carpathian Ruthenia and northeastern part of the Great Hungarian Plain). In 1554 town of Kassa (now Košice) became its seat. Its Captain-general was usually called just "Captain of Kassa" (Kassai kapitány).

=== Captaincy of Croatia ===
Also known as the Karlstadt (Karlovac) Captaincy. It was located on the border of Croatia and Bosnia. This part of the Military Frontier included the geographic regions of Lika, Kordun, Banovina (named after "Banska krajina"), and bordered the Adriatic Sea to the west, Venetian Republic to the south, Habsburg Croatia (the river Sava) to the west, and the Ottoman Empire to the east. It existed from around 1559 to 1873 when it was demilitarized and eight years later (in 1881) merged into the Kingdom of Croatia. The capital city was Karlovac and the official languages were Latin and Chakavian.

=== Captaincy of Slavonia ===
Captaincy of Croatia, also known as the Warasdin Captaincy, Habsburg Croatia, Kingdom of Slovenje, Slovenski Orsag, Kaikavian Kingdom of Slavonia, regnum Sclavoniae and Vend. It was created in 1578 and lasted until 1873 when it was demilitarized and eight years later (in 1881) merged into the Kingdom of Croatia. Its main purpose was to help the Habsburgs hold the line against the Ottoman invasion. Their attempt succeeded and the Ottomans were held there until Slavonia was returned to the Habsburg rule following Great Turkish War and Treaty of Karlowitz in 1699. The capital city was Zagreb (Agram) and the official languages were Latin and Kajkavian.

== Sources ==
- Pálffy, Géza|: A császárváros védelmében. A győri főkapitányság története 1526–1598, Győr–Moson–Sopron Megye Győri Levéltárának kiadványa, Győr, 1999.
- Štefanec, Nataša. Ustroj Vojne krajine 1578. godine i hrvatsko-slavonski staleži u regionalnoj obrani i politici. Srednja Europa: Zagreb, 2011.
