= Battle of Zernest =

1690 conflict of the Habsburg-Ottoman wars

Coordinates: 45°34′N 25°20′E

- Part of Great Turkish War
| Date | 21 August 1690 |
| Location | Zernest, Transylvania |
| Result | Ottoman victory |

Belligerents
| Holy Roman Empire; Transylvania | Ottoman Empire; Crimean Khanate; Wallachia; Hungarian Kurucs |

Commanders and leaders
| Donat Heissler (POW); Mihály Teleki † | Imre Thököly; Constantin Brâncoveanu; Cerkes Ahmed Paşa †; Ghazi Garay |

Strength
| 2,000 Imperial cavalrymen 7,000 Transylvanians | 16,000 |

Casualties and losses
| 1,800 Imperials killed, wounded or prisoner | 300 |

The Battle of Zernest was fought on 11 August 1690, near the town of Zernest (Zărnești) in southeastern Transylvania (today in Romania), between the allied forces of Transylvania and the Holy Roman Empire, and the forces of the Ottoman Empire and their vassals, the Crimean Tatars and Wallachians, and the allied Hungarian Kurucs.

== Battle ==
Imre Thököly aspired to proclaim himself Prince of Transylvania; allied with the Turks, he had campaigned unsuccessfully in 1686 and 1688 to win the Transylvanian crown. In 1690 he launched another campaign. The Sultan gave him command of a 16,000-men (mostly Ottomans, Tatars, and some Kurucs), army with which he penetrated into Transylvania. He was later joined by Wallachian Voivode Constantin Brâncoveanu with a few thousand troops.

Brâncoveanu was the true master-mind of the campaign and managed to pass the Ottoman army through the Carpathians on barely known mountain passes and so bypassing the Bran Pass, which was defended and fortified by the Imperial army. Donat Heissler was as such forced to give battle near the town of Zărnești.

In this battle, the combined Ottoman army decisively defeated the united Habsburg–Transylvanian army and captured Donat Heissler. Transylvanian count Mihály Teleki was killed in action.

== Aftermath ==
Following this victory, a Diet called in Grossau/Kereszténysziget elected Imre Thököly Prince of Transylvania. Nevertheless, he could only maintain his position against the Habsburg armies with the utmost difficulty. In 1691 he quit Transylvania altogether.

Though Imre Thököly's reign was short-lived, it forced the Imperial army to move troops from Serbia to take back Transylvania, as from Transylvania, Hungary and the Imperial supply and communication lines could have been attacked. This movement of troops made it possible for the Ottomans to push the Holy League's army back across the Danube and even recapture the Banat. As a result, a stable front was made on the Danube river and on the Carpathian Mountains.

== Sources ==
- Enciclopedia Romaniei
- Tudor Duică: Transsylvanica
