= Mihály Teleki =

Chancellor of Transylvania (1634–1690)

Mihály Teleki (Oradea, Principality of Transylvania, 1634 - Zărnești, 21 August 1690), was Chancellor of Transylvania and adviser to Prince Michael I Apafi.

== Biography ==
Michael Teleki (Hungarian: Teleki Mihály) was born in the Hungarian noble Teleki family. He was the only son of Johann Teleki (1614-1662) and his wife Anna Bornemisza.

In 1657, he was captain of the bodyguard of George II Rákóczi. After Rákóczi's death, he joined the camp of the new Prince of Transylvania, János Kemény. On 23 January 1662 Teleki fought on the side of Kemény against the Turks in the lost Battle of Nagyszőllős, in which Kemény was killed. Teleki was sentenced to death and his property confiscated. However, since he took the oath of allegiance to the new Prince Michael I Apafi, he was pardoned.

Related to Apafi on his mother's side, he gained considerable political influence and even became Chancellor of Transylvania in 1688. Lord Apafi was a weak ruler, so the principality was actually run by his wife Anna Bornemisza in cooperation with Teleki.

Teleki played a role in the Anti-Habsburg Magnate conspiracy, and became in 1672 the leader of the Kurucs in Transylvania. After his unsuccessful siege of Prešov, his star among the insurgents began to decline, and the Kurucs chose Imre Thököly as their leader. After that, Teleki completely turned away from the Kurucs and fundamentally changed his policy.

Influenced by the victory of the imperial troops at the Battle of Kahlenberg near Vienna in 1683, Teleki, an outspoken power politician who knew that the Austrian Empire would now be the dominant political power in Central Europe, became a supporter of Imperial Austria. For this support, he was elevated to an imperial count of the Holy Roman Empire by Emperor Leopold I in 1685. After recapturing Buda in 1686, Field Marshal Antonio Caraffa occupied Transylvania in 1687. Teleki and the influential nobles of Transylvania sided with Caraffa.

In August 1690, Imre Thököly invaded Transylvania at the head of an army consisting of Kurucs and Turks. On 21 August, he defeated the Imperial troops commanded by Michael Teleki and the Austrian General Donat Johann Heissler von Heitersheim in the Battle of Zernest. Teleki fell in battle and Heissler was taken prisoner.

Teleki was buried in the Evangelical Reformed Church in Gernyeszeg.

== Sources ==
- BLKÖ:Teleki, Michael (II.)
- Teleki Mihály gróf (széki) arcanum.hu (Hungarian)
