= Battle of Eperjes =

1685 battle

- Part of Great Turkish War
Date	11 August 1685
Location	Eperjes, Kingdom of Hungary (modern-day Prešov, eastern Slovakia)
Result	Holy Roman Empire victory

Belligerents
Holy Roman Empire	Ottoman Empire

Commanders and leaders
General Schulz	Imre Thököly

The Battle of Eperjes was fought on 11 August 1685 near the city of Eperjes in the Kingdom of Hungary (now Prešov, Slovakia), between the forces of the Ottoman Empire, and the forces of the Habsburg monarchy as part of the Great Turkish War.

The Habsburg army defeated the invading forces of Imre Thököly.
