= Uherčice (Znojmo District) =

- Municipality
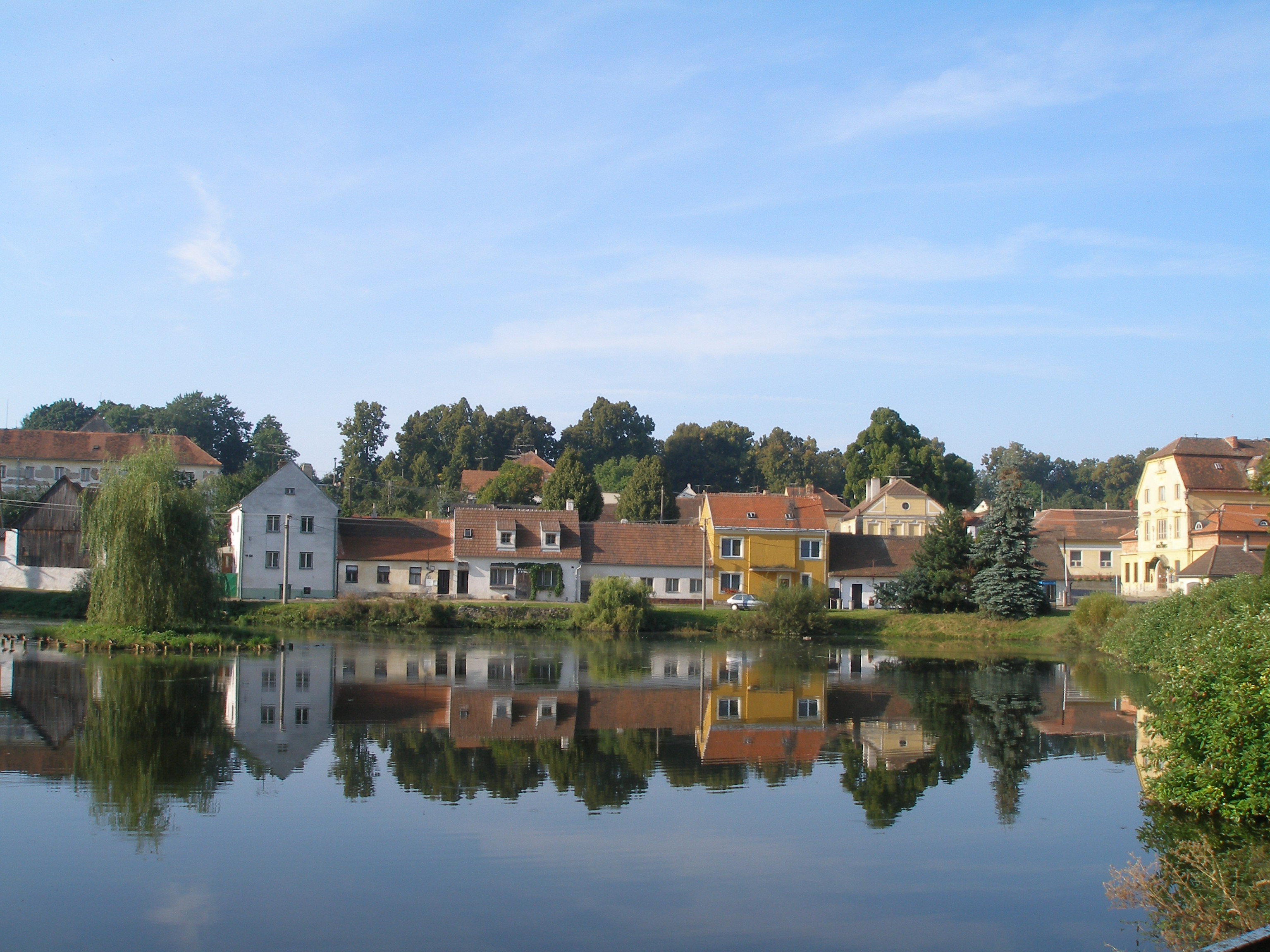
- View across the pond in the centre of Uherčice

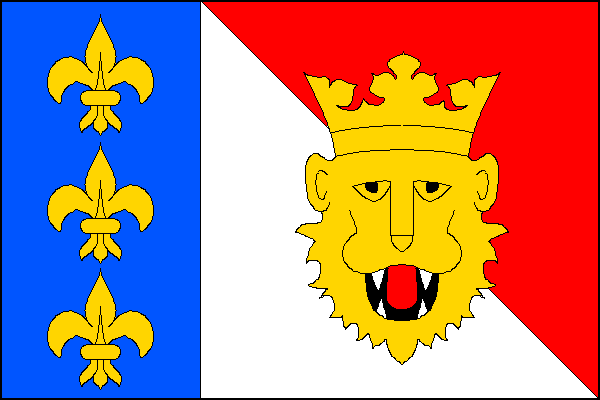
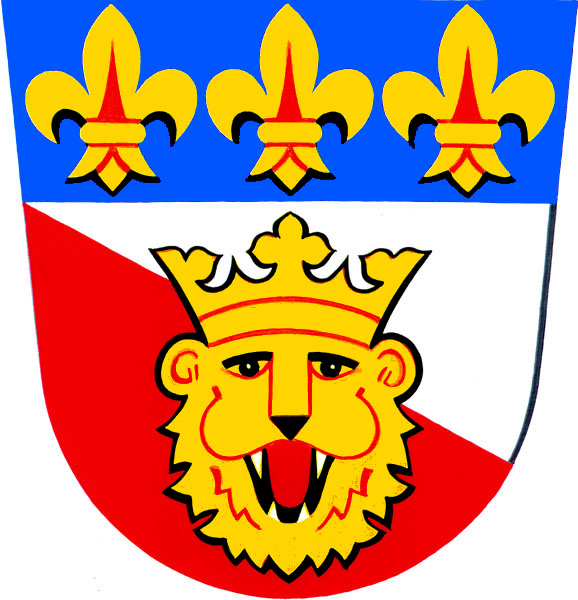
- Flag Coat of arms

- Location in the Czech Republic
- Coordinates: 48°54′48″N 16°37′49″E
- Country: Czech Republic
- Region: South Moravian
- District: Znojmo
- First mentioned: 1312

Area
  - Total: 12.51 km^{2} (4.83 sq mi)
- Elevation: 430 m (1,410 ft)

Population (2026-01-01)
  - Total: 366
  - Density: 29.3/km^{2} (75.8/sq mi)
- Time zone: UTC+1 (CET)
  - Summer (DST): UTC+2 (CEST)
- Postal code: 671 07
- Website: www.obec-uhercice.cz

Uherčice (German: Ungarschitz) is a municipality and village in Znojmo District in the South Moravian Region of the Czech Republic. It has about 400 inhabitants.

Uherčice lies approximately 31 kilometres (19 mi) west of Znojmo, 79 km (49 mi) south-west of Brno, and 157 km (98 mi) south-east of Prague.

== Administrative division ==
Uherčice consists of two municipal parts (in brackets population according to the 2021 census):

- Uherčice (278)
- Mešovice (57)

== History ==
The first written mention of Uherčice is from 1312.

== Demographics ==
Historical population
Year	Pop.	±%
1869	690	—
1880	679	−1.6%
1890	648	−4.6%
1900	649	+0.2%
1910	645	−0.6%
1921	761	+18.0%
1930	743	−2.4%
1950	561	−24.5%
1961	618	+10.2%
1970	505	−18.3%
1980	432	−14.5%
1991	452	+4.6%
2001	428	−5.3%
2011	385	−10.0%
2021	335	−13.0%
Source: Censuses
