= Emeric Thököly =

Prince of Upper Hungary from 1682 to 1685

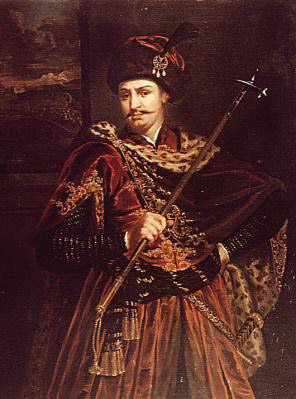

Prince of Upper Hungary
- Reign: 1682–1685

Prince of Transylvania (contested by Michael II Apafi)
- Reign: 22 September 1690 – 25 October 1690
- Predecessor: Michael I Apafi
- Successor: Michael II Apafi
- Born: Imre Thököly de Késmárk; 25 September 1657; Késmárk, Kingdom of Hungary (now Kežmarok, Slovakia)
- Died: 13 September 1705 (aged 47); İzmit, Ottoman Empire (now Turkey)
- Burial: İzmit (1705); Kežmarok since 1906
- Spouse: Ilona Zrínyi
- Issue: Erzsébet Thököly
- House: Thököly
- Father: István Thököly
- Mother: Mária Gyulaffy
- Religion: Lutheran
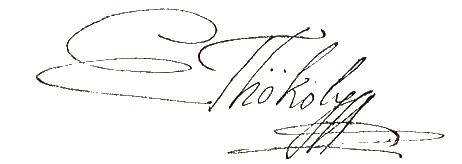
- Signature

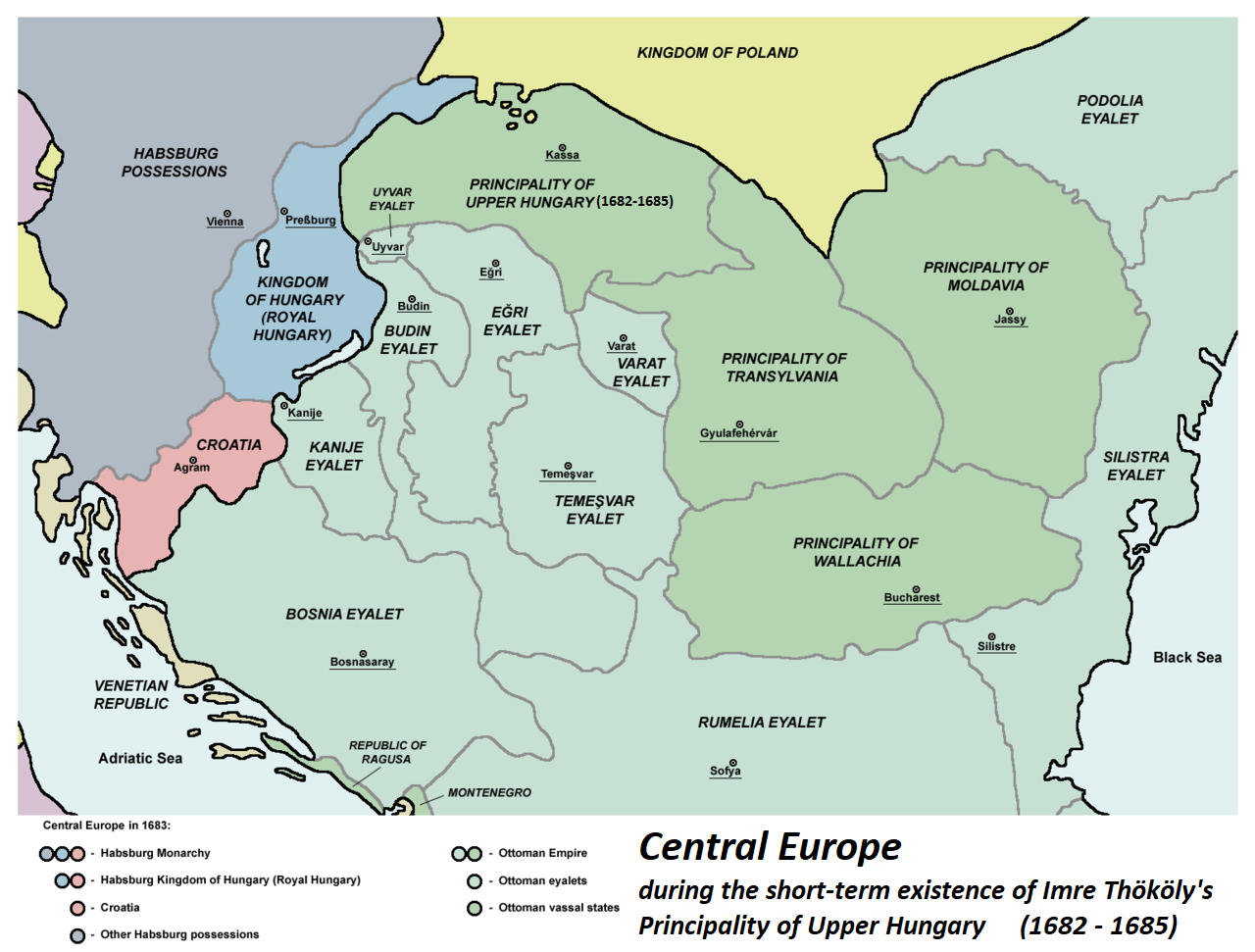
Principality of Imre Thököly (Principality of Upper Hungary) in 1683

Emeric Thököly de Késmárk (Hungarian: késmárki Thököly Imre; Slovak: Imrich Tököli; French: Emeric Tekeli; Turkish: Tököli İmre; 25 September 1657 – 13 September 1705) was a Hungarian nobleman, leader of anti-Habsburg uprisings like his father, Count István Thököly, before him. Emeric was Prince of Upper Hungary, an Ottoman vassal state, from 1682 to 1685, and briefly Prince of Transylvania during the year 1690. Having formed an alliance with the Turks, Thököly assisted the Ottoman Empire at the Battle of Vienna in 1683 and led the Turkish cavalry at the Battle of Zenta in 1697. Refusing to surrender to Habsburg Emperor Leopold I, Thököly lost his principality of Upper Hungary and finally retired to Galata, near Constantinople, with large estates granted to him by Mustafa II.

== Early life ==
Thököly was born in Késmárk in Royal Hungary (now Kežmarok in Slovakia) on 25 September 1657 as the fifth son of Count István Thököly and Mária Gyulaffy. His father was one of the wealthiest aristocrats in Upper Hungary (in present-day Slovakia); his mother was the granddaughter of Stephen Bethlen, who had been prince of Transylvania in 1630, she was related to three princes of Transylvania. Being his parents' only son to survive childhood, Thököly inherited when he was still a child his mother's estates in the Principality of Transylvania in 1659. His uncle, Count Francis Rhédey, Prince of Transylvania, who died in 1667, also bequeathed his domains in Máramaros County to Thököly. A significant part of Thököly's inherited lands were located in Máramaros County. István Thököly persuaded Michael I Apafi, Prince of Transylvania, to make Emeric Thököly the ispán (or head) of the county in 1667. Actually, Apafi's influential counselor Mihály Teleki administered Máramaros on behalf of the minor ispán.

Thököly started his formal education at the Lutheran lyceum in Eperjes (now Prešov in Slovakia) in January 1668. Being an intelligent student, he quickly understood the main aspects of Lutheran theology and learnt to write long texts in perfect Latin. He played the role of the king of Hungary in a drama presented at the school in October 1669.

István Thököly was accused of participating in the leading aristocrats' conspiracy against the Habsburg monarch, Leopold I, in 1670. Being concerned about his son's safety, he ordered him to return to Késmárk. They soon moved to Árva Castle (now Orava Castle in Slovakia), which stood near the border of Hungary and Poland. The king's troops laid siege to the fortress and István Thököly died during the siege on 4 December. According to one version of the story of the siege, Emeric Thököly escaped from the fortress through a tunnel after his father died and fled first to Poland, then to Transylvania. Other sources say that his father had sent him to Likava Castle before the siege of Árva began, and he fled to Transylvania after learning of his father's death.

== In exile ==
Leopold I's soldiers suppressed all resistance in Royal Hungary. Hundreds of noblemen were dispossessed of their estates; foreign mercenaries replaced the Hungarian troops in the fortresses and started plundering the nearby towns and villages. Leopold I did not respect the fundamental laws of the kingdom and appointed a Directorium to administer Hungary in 1673, led by Johann Caspar von Ampringen, the Grand Master of the Teutonic Order. The new government pursued a violent anti-Protestant policy and dozens of Protestant pastors were sentenced to slavery. The persecuted Hungarians – expelled noblemen, ousted soldiers and fugitive serfs – sought refuge in Ottoman Hungary and the Partium. The refugees, who were called kuruc, made frequent raids against the borderlands of Royal Hungary.

Thököly's patrimony was confiscated, but he remained a wealthy man because he retained his Transylvanian estates. He accepted Mihály Teleki's advice and continued his studies at the Reformed college of Nagyenyed (now Aiud in Romania). Contemporaneous diaries evidence that the handsome young count easily enchanted both men and women.

The envoys of Louis XIV of France and Apafi signed a treaty in Warsaw in May 1677. The French promised to send an annual subsidy to the Kuruc to finance their fight against the Habsburgs. Apafi did not declare war on Leopold I, but promised to secure the professional command of the Kuruc troops and to provide asylum to them in case of defeats. Thököly soon started to urge Apafi to allow him to join the refugees. Louis XIV's envoy, Abbé Dominique Révérend, who met with Imre around that time, described him as "the most powerful lord and the most honest man in Hungary". The princely council appointed Emeric Thököly to command the Kuruc army on 26 September. Apafi also authorized him to raise volunteer troops in Transylvania.

== Uprising ==
Thököly and the Transylvanian volunteers joined the Kuruc at Derecske on 27 November 1677. His revenues from his Transylvanian estates enabled him to improve the equipment of the army. According to a new French–Transylvanian treaty, Mihály Teleki was installed as the supreme commander of the Kuruc army on 16 February 1678, but Teleki's appointment did not affect Thököly's actual leadership. The Kuruc and Transylvanian troops assembled near Tasnád (now Tășnad in Romania), before they invaded Royal Hungary in June. Thököly captured the fortresses of Szendrő and Murány in early August.

Teleki and the Transylvanian army attacked Eperjes, but they abandoned the siege as soon as they were informed of the arrival of a relieving army in the middle of the month. Thököly continued the invasion with the support of local Slovak peasants. He captured Igló and Rózsahegy (now Spišská Nová Ves and Ružomberok in Slovakia), and the mining towns along the river Garam (Hron). Besztercebánya (now Banská Bystrica in Slovakia) surrendered without resistance on 10 October. Although he had to abandon the mining towns after he was defeated at Barsszentkereszt (now Žiar nad Hronom in Slovakia) on 1 November, he continued to control 13 counties in Royal Hungary.

Encouraged by promises of help from Louis XIV, the anti-Habsburg rebels now rose "pro libertate et justitia", and chose the youthful Thököly as their leader. The war began in 1678. Eastern Hungarian Kingdom and central Hungarian mining towns were soon in Thököly's possession. In 1681, reinforced by 10,000 Transylvanians and a Turkish army under the Pasha of Nagyvárad (today Oradea, Romania), he compelled the Emperor to grant an armistice. In June 1682 he married Croatian countess Jelena Zrinska (in Hungarian: Zrínyi Ilona), the widow of Prince Francis I Rákóczi.

Thököly's distrust of the Emperor now induced him to turn for help to Sultan Mehmed IV, who gave him the title "King of Upper Hungary" (Ķıralı Orta Macar) – partly coinciding with present-day Slovakia – on condition that he pay an annual tribute of 40,000 Thalers. In the course of the same year, Thököly captured fortress after fortress from the Emperor and extended his dominions to the Vág (Slovak: Váh) river. At the two Diets held by him, at Kassa (today Košice, Slovakia) and Tállya, in 1683, the Estates, though not uninfluenced by his personal charm, showed some want of confidence in him, fearing he might sacrifice national independence to the Turkish alliance. They refused therefore to grant him either subsidies or a levy en masse, and he had to take what he wanted by force.

== Alliance with the Ottoman Empire ==
Thököly materially assisted the Turks in the Battle of Vienna in 1683, and shared the fate of the gigantic Turkish army. The Turkish Grand Vizier nevertheless laid the blame for the Turkish defeat in Vienna on Thököly, who thereupon hastened to Edirne to defend himself before the Turkish sultan. Shortly afterwards, perceiving that the Turkish cause was now lost, he sought the mediation of Polish king John III Sobieski to reconcile him with the Emperor, offering to lay down his arms if the Emperor would confirm the religious rights of the Protestants in Hungary and grant him, Thököly, Upper Hungary (more exactly, 13 northeastern counties of Royal Hungary) with the title of prince. Leopold refused these terms and demanded an unconditional surrender. Thököly then renewed the war. However, the campaign of 1685 was a series of disasters, he was defeated at Prešov (Eperjes) and when he sought help from the Turks at Nagyvárad they seized him and sent him in chains to Edirne (possibly because of his previous negotiations with Leopold), whereupon most of his followers made their peace with the Emperor.

In 1686 Thököly was released from his dungeon and sent with a small army into Transylvania, but both this expedition and a similar one in 1688 ended in failure. The Turks then again grew suspicious of him and imprisoned him a second time. In 1690, however, they dispatched him into Transylvania a third time with 16,000 men, and in September he routed the united forces of General Donat Heissler and Count Mihály Teleki at Zărneşti. After this great victory, Thököly was elected prince of Transylvania by the Kereszténysziget Diet, but could not maintain his position for long against the imperial armies. In 1691 he quit Transylvania altogether. He led the Turkish cavalry at the Battle of Slankamen and served valiantly but vainly against Austria during the remainder of the war, especially distinguishing himself at the Battle of Zenta (1697).

He was excluded by name from the amnesty promised to the Hungarian rebels by the Treaty of Karlowitz (26 January 1699). After one more unsuccessful attempt, in 1700, to recover the principality, he settled down at Galata with his wife. From Sultan Mustafa II he received large estates and the title of count of Widdin. He died in 1705 in İzmit. He is buried in Kežmarok in the mausoleum of the so-called new church.

== Legacy ==
Thököly's statue is part of Heroes' Square in Budapest, a UNESCO World Heritage Site. For his 300th death anniversary, his name was given to a street in İzmit. A memorial dedicated to him and his wife is also present in a park in İzmit.

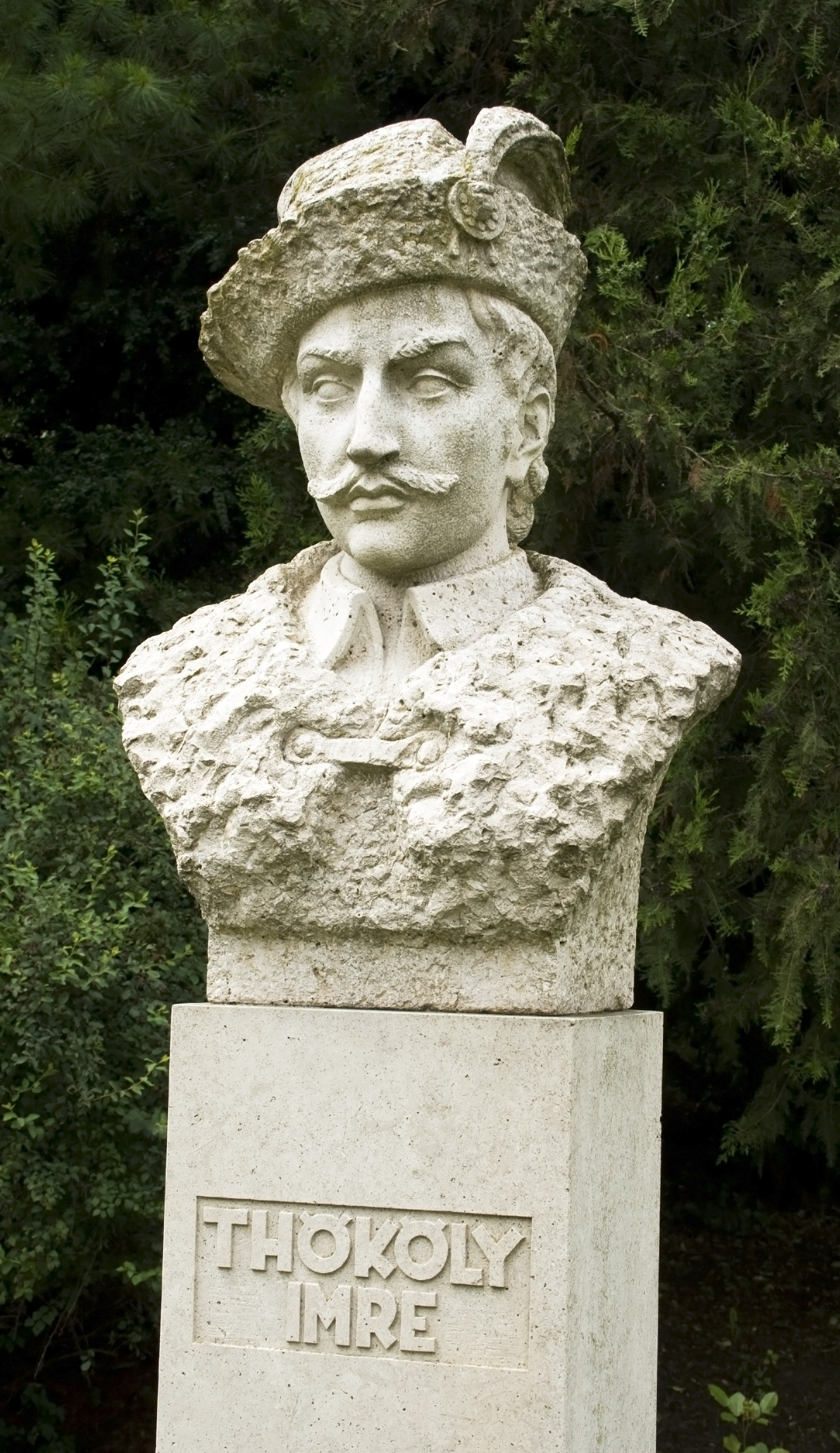
Bust of Imre Thököly in the park of the Vaja Castle, Hungary

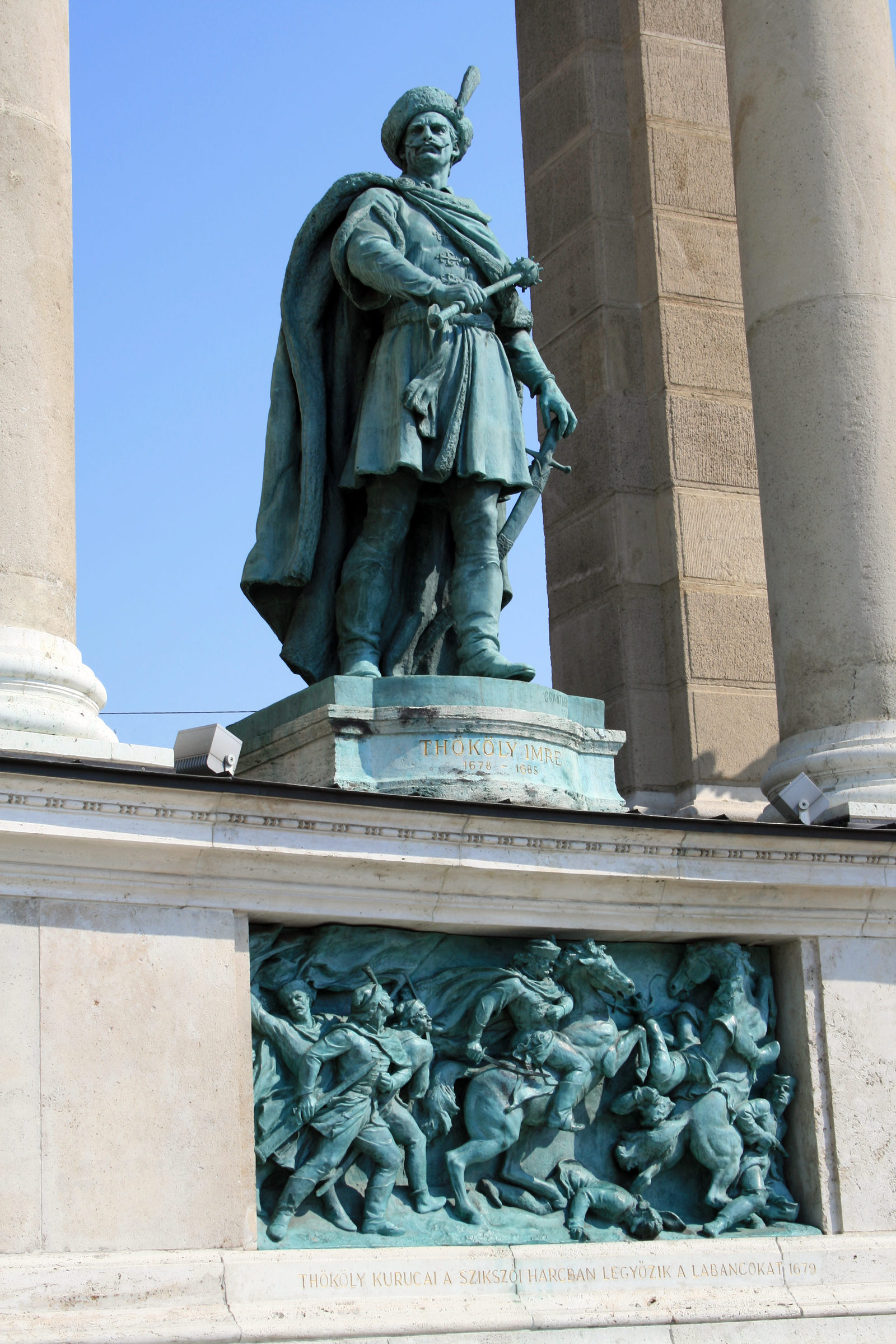
Imre Thököly in Heroes' Square, Budapest

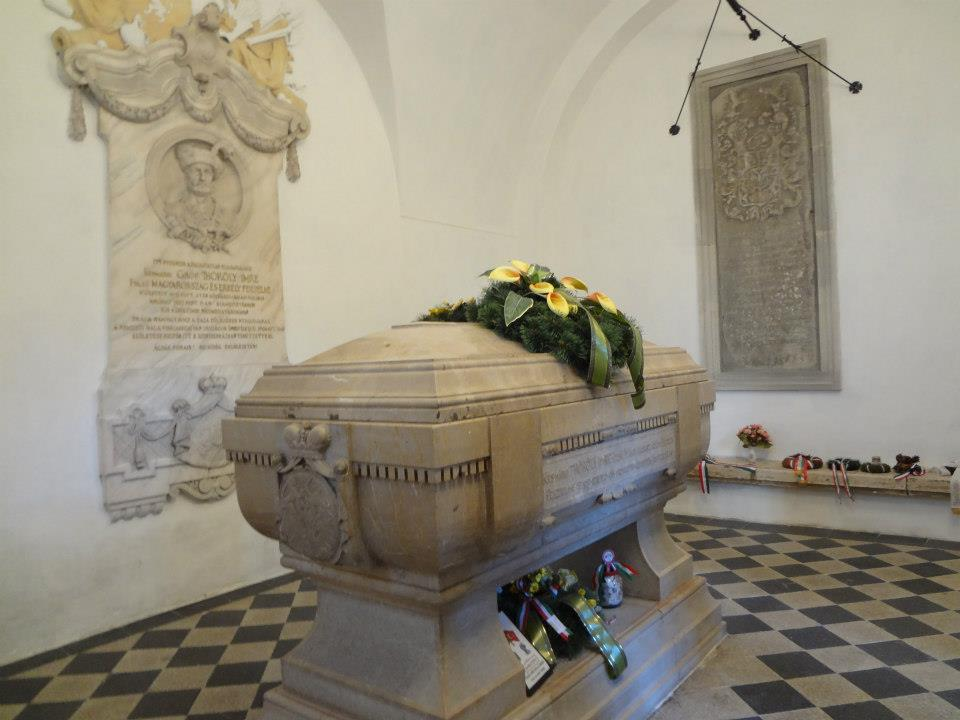
Tomb of Imre Thököly in Kežmarok

== See also ==
- List of revolutions and rebellions
  - List of rebellions in the Habsburg monarchy

== Sources ==
- This article incorporates text from a publication now in the public domain: Bain, Robert Nisbet (1911). "Thököly, Imre". In Chisholm, Hugh (ed.). Encyclopædia Britannica. Vol. 26 (11th ed.). Cambridge University Press. pp. 861–862.
- Balogh, Judit (2012). "Thököly Imre". In Gujdár, Noémi; Szatmáry, Nóra (eds.). Magyar királyok nagykönyve: Uralkodóink, kormányzóink és az erdélyi fejedelmek életének és tetteinek képes története [Encyclopedia of the Kings of Hungary: An Illustrated History of the Life and Deeds of Our Monarchs, Regents and the Princes of Transylvania] (in Hungarian). Reader's Digest. pp. 242–245. ISBN 978-963-289-214-6.
- Cartledge, Bryan (2011). The Will to Survive: A History of Hungary. C. Hurst & Co. ISBN 978-1-84904-112-6.
- Clerc, J.L. (1693). Histoire d'Emeric, comte de Tekeli: ou, Memoires pour servir a sa vie. Où l'on voit ce qui s'est passé de plus considerable en Hongrie depuis sa naissance jusqu'à present (in French). Chez Jacques de la Verité.
- Fallenbüchl, Zoltán (1994). Magyarország főispánjai, 1526–1848 [Heads of the Counties in Hungary, 1526–1848] (in Hungarian). Argumentum Kiadó. ISBN 963-7719-81-4.
- Kovács, Gergely István (2011). Thököly Imre és II. Rákóczi Ferenc [Emeric Thököly and Francis II Rákóczi] (in Hungarian). Duna International. ISBN 978-615-5013-37-9.
- Markó, László (2006). A magyar állam főméltóságai Szent Istvántól napjainkig: Életrajzi Lexikon [Great Officers of State in Hungary from King Saint Stephen to Our Days: A Biographical Encyclopedia] (in Hungarian). Helikon Kiadó. ISBN 963-547-085-1.
- Péter, Katalin (1981). "1606–1686". In Benda, Kálmán; Péter, Katalin (eds.). Magyarország történeti kronológiája, II: 1526–1848 [Historical Chronology of Hungary, Volume I: 1526–1848] (in Hungarian). Akadémiai Kiadó. pp. 430–509. ISBN 963-05-2662-X.
- R. Várkonyi, Ágnes (1994). "The End of Turkish Rule in Transylvania and the Reunification of Hungary (1660–1711)". In Köpeczi, Béla; Barta, Gábor; Bóna, István; Makkai, László; Szász, Zoltán; Borus, Judit (eds.). History of Transylvania. Akadémiai Kiadó. pp. 359–411. ISBN 963-05-6703-2.
