= Morean campaign =

Morean campaign may refer to:

- Morean campaigns of Constantine XI Palaiologos
- Ottoman conquest of the Morea (1458–1460)
- Morean War (1684–1699), between the Ottoman Empire and Venice
- Ottoman reconquest of the Morea (1715)
- Morea expedition (1828–1833), French intervention in the Greek War of Independence
