= Ahmed III Mosque =

Historical mosque in Corinth, Greece

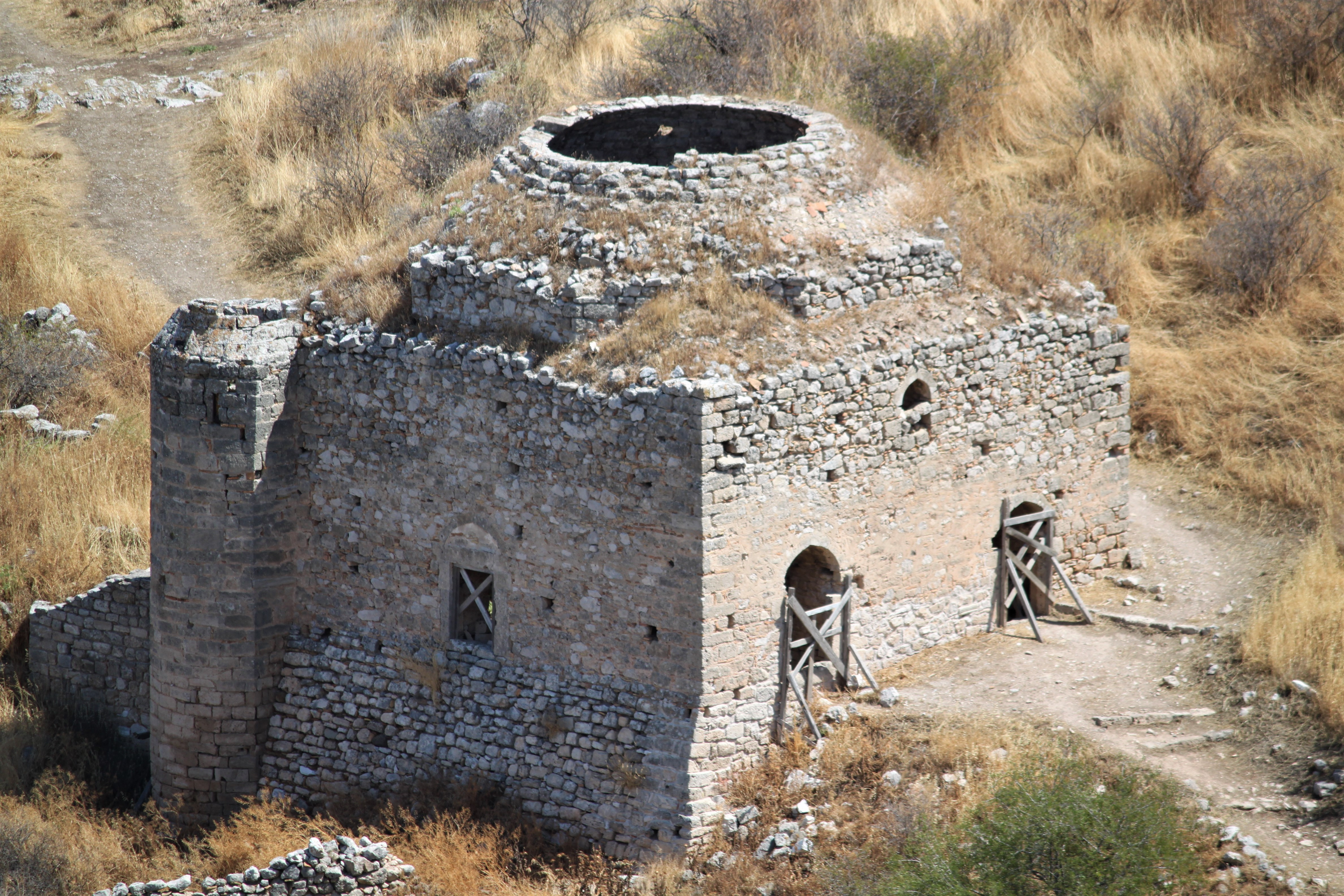
- Ruins of the former mosque

- Location of the former mosque in Greece

Religion
- Affiliation: Islam (former)
- Province: Peloponnese
- Status: Abandoned (ruinous state)

Location
- Location: Acrocorinth, Peloponnese
- State: Mosque (former)
- Country: Greece
- Interactive map of Ahmed III Mosque
- Coordinates: 37°53′29″N 22°52′20″E

Architecture
- Type: Mosque architecture
- Founder: Ahmet III
- Completed: 1715

Specifications
- Dome: 1
- Minaret: 1 (destroyed)
- Materials: Stone, brick

The Ahmed III Mosque (Greek: Τζαμί του Αχμέτ Γ΄), also known as the Acrocorinth Mosque (Greek: Τζαμί της Ακροκορίνθου) or the Ahmed Pasha Mosque (Turkish: Ahmet Paşa Camii), (Note: The Greek Ministry of Culture and Sports identifies this monument dating from the first period of Ottoman rule as "Mosque I", thus differentiating it from "Mosque II" located approximately 110 meters to the south. However, the reference ministerial publication on Ottoman architecture in Greece more simply designates the building as the “Mosque of the Acrocorinth”.) is an Ottoman former mosque, in a ruinous state, located in the fortress of the Acrocorinth, in the Peloponnese, Greece. Built on the site of an earlier 16th-century mosque, the monument was commissioned by Sultan Ahmed III after the Ottoman reconquest of 1715. It now lies in a mostly ruinous state, abandoned and neglected. Some restoration work was completed in 2000.

== History ==
It is one of the four in total mosques to have been built in the Acrocorinth.

After the conquest of Corinth by the Ottoman troops of Sultan Mehmed II in 1458, the citadel of the Acrocorinth was equipped with several mosques. The Ottoman traveller Evliya Çelebi, who visited the region in 1668, mentioned four buildings punctuating the Islamic religious life of the fortress. (Note: In this case three large mosques for Friday prayer (cami) and a small mosque for daily prayer (mesjid).) Probably dating from the 16th century, a first mosque in the northern part can be identified as the mosque of Ahmed Pasha or of Bayezid mentioned by Evliya Çelebi. Two oak elements, recovered from wall masonry and in the minaret by archaeologists Richard Rothaus and Timothy E. Gregory, are dated 1489 and 1508.

The mosque vaguely mentioned in 1668 was transformed into a powder magazine during the second period of Venetian occupation between 1687 and 1715. At the very end of the 17th century, a plan of the Acrocorinth by the engineer Pierre de la Salle, in the Gennadius Library, indicates that the place also served as a storage for biscuits intended for the garrison, also called bread of ammunition. Shortly after the recapture of the fortress by the Ottomans in 1715, a new mosque was erected by Sultan Ahmed III on the ruins of previous constructions.

The mosque was studied by archaeologists Antoine Bon and Rhys Carpenter in 1936. During the 2000s, the building underwent consolidation work, directed mainly towards the structural reinforcement of the windows and the minaret.

== Architecture ==
The Ahmed III Mosque, which measures 8.50 × 9.50 meters, has the characteristics and the simple plan of the first Ottoman mosques in the Balkans. Traces of the earlier mosque are still identifiable today, particularly in the pointed style of the openings, typical of the early Ottoman period.

The general masonry is particularly heterogeneous, consisting mainly of limestone and a few randomly arranged bricks. The exterior walls of 0.70 meter are more controlled in the corners and for the base of the minaret, where materials from older buildings have been integrated. On the main facade to the north are traces of the arrangements of the second Venetian period, in particular the use of voussoirs at the top of the door and the lion of Saint Mark, emblem of the Republic of Venice.

The base of the minaret, preserving within it the spiral staircase, is located at the northwest corner of the mosque, at the level of the porch of which only a few sections of exterior walls remain on the eastern side. A large cupola on squinches, partially destroyed since the end of the twentieth century due to lack of maintenance, surmounts the square prayer hall. In the center of the south wall, framed by two windows, the building has a mihrab in the Turkish Baroque style is still visible to this today. The muqarnas niche has an ornate double rectangular frame.

== Gallery ==
The Mosque of Ahmed III

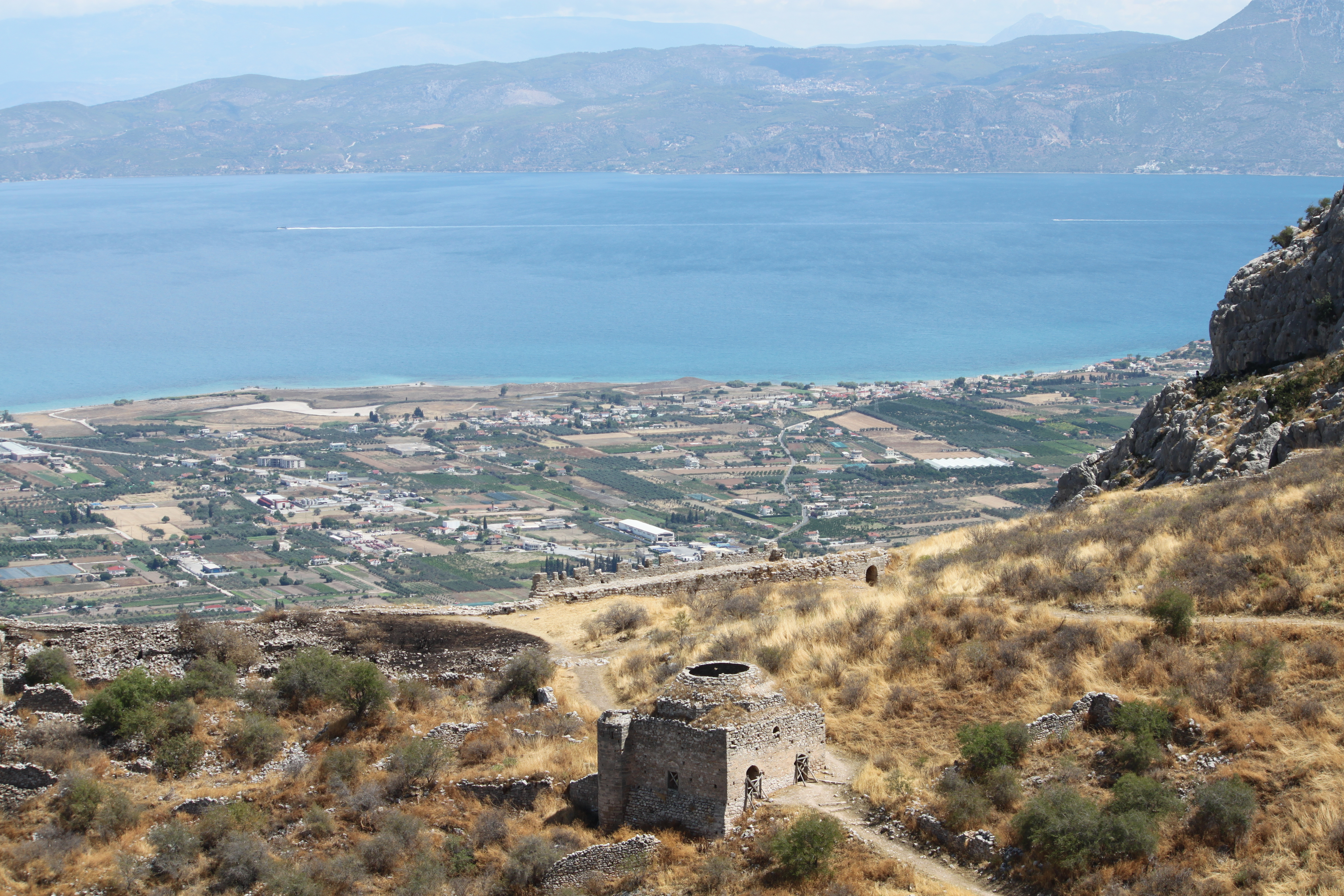
The mosque over the Corinthian Gulf.

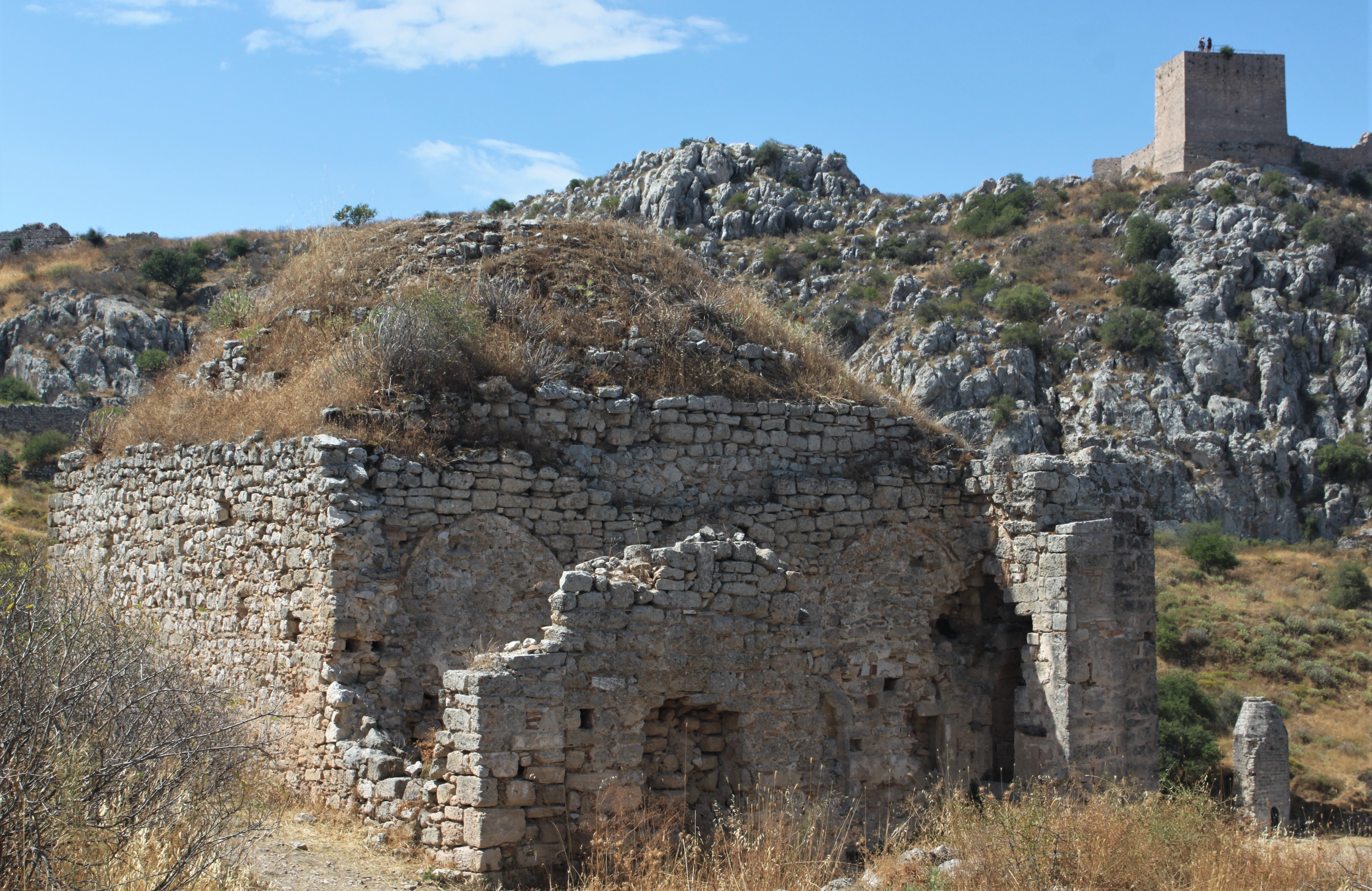
Mosque, minaret and Frankish tower.

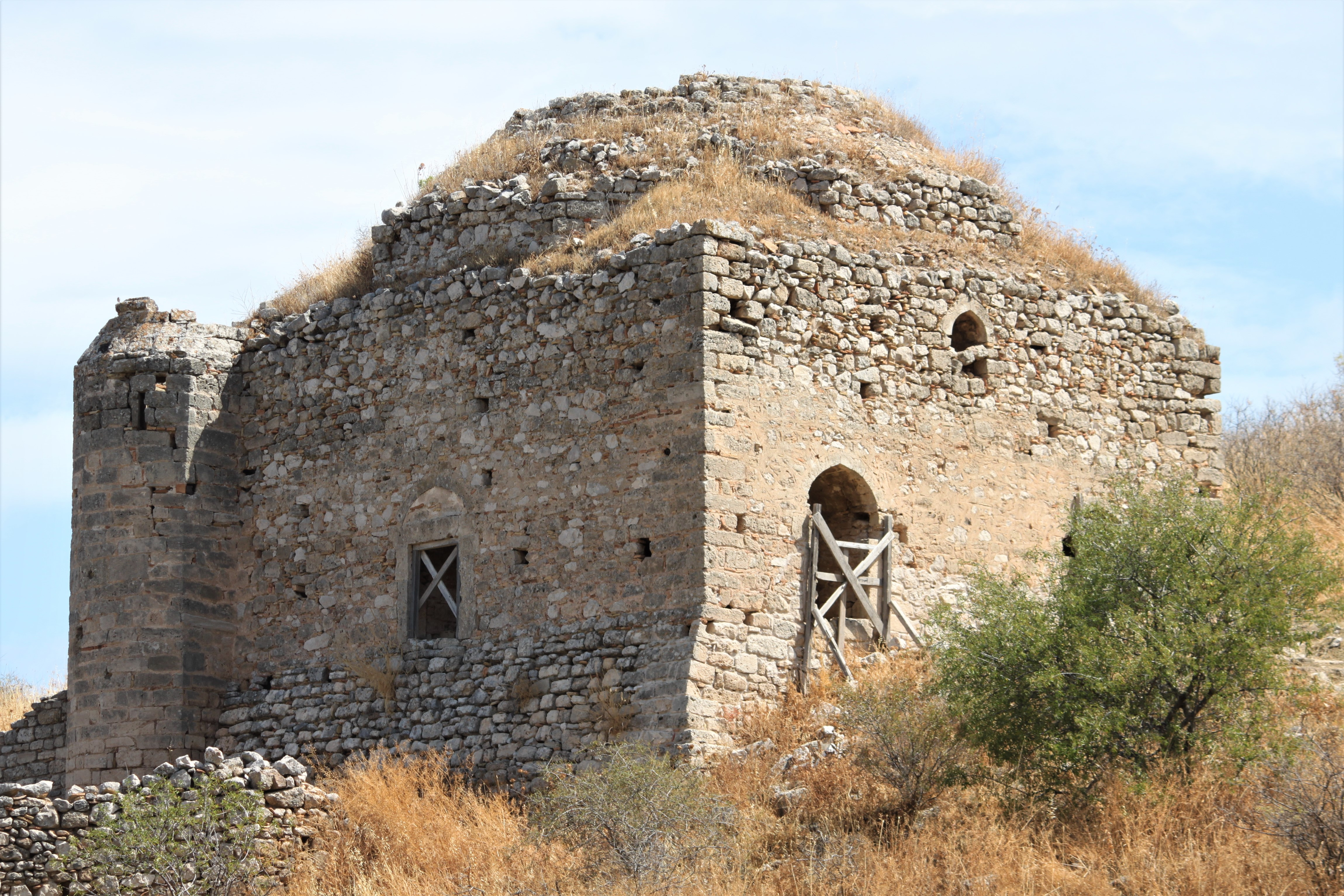
View of the mosque from the south.

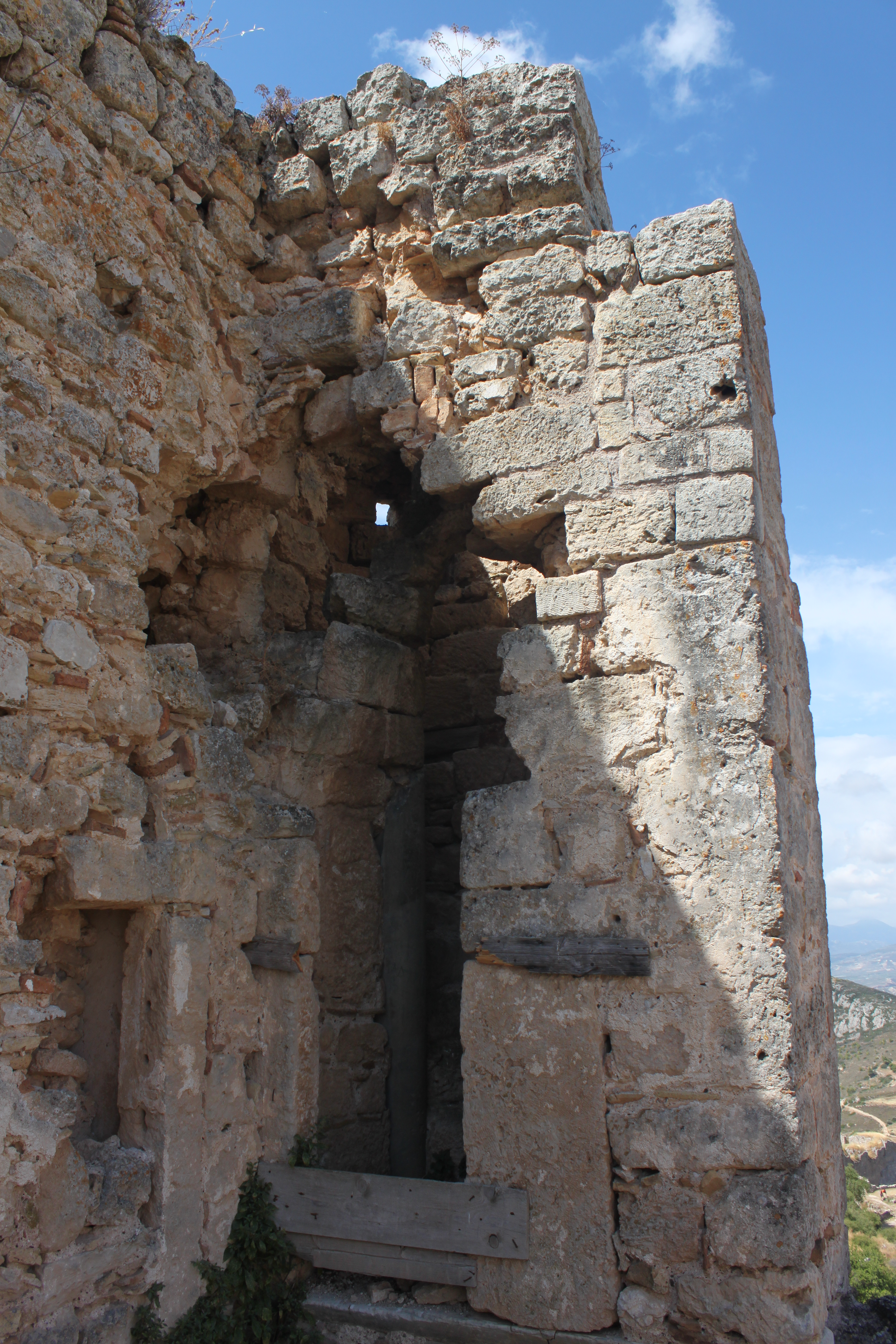
Minaret at the northwest.

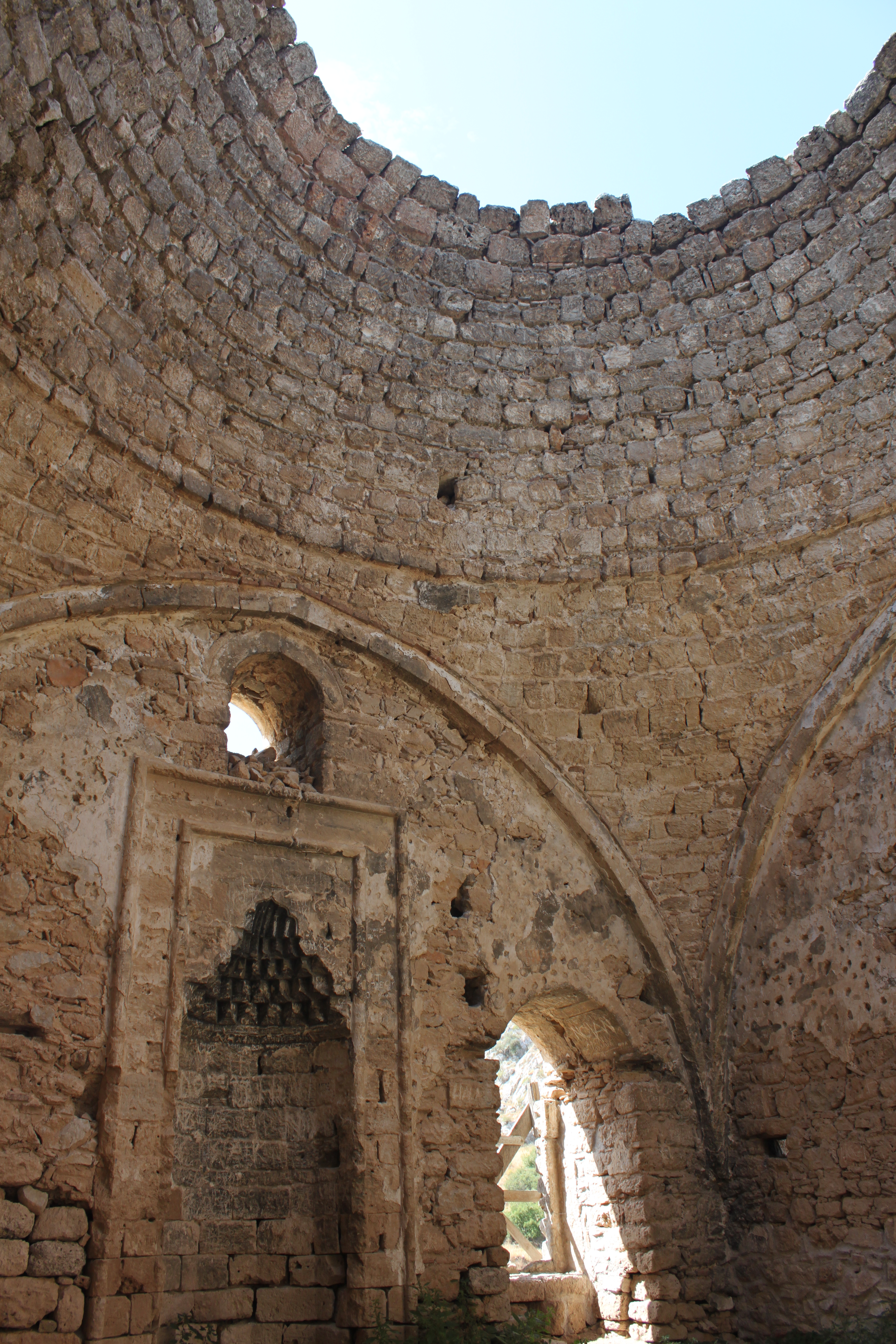
Interior of the mosque.

== See also ==
- Islam in Greece
- List of former mosques in Greece
- List of mosques in Greece
- Ottoman Greece

== Bibliography ==
- Ameen, Ahmed (2017). Islamic architecture in Greece: Mosques. Alexandria: Center for Islamic Civilization studies, Bibliotheca Alexandrina. ISBN 9774524349.
- Kiel, Machiel (2016). "Corinth in the Ottoman period (1458-1687 and 1715-1821) : the afterlife of a great ancient Greek and Roman metropolis" (PDF). Shedet. 3 (5): 45–71. doi:10.21608/shedet.003.05. ISSN 2356-8704.
- Koumousi, Anastasia (2008). "Mosque of Acrocorinth". In Ersi Brouskari (ed.). Ottoman architecture in Greece. Translated by Elizabeth Key Fowden. Athens: Ministry of Culture and Sports. p. 136. ISBN 978-960-214-792-4.
