= Haji Halil Pasha =

Grand Vizier of the Ottoman Empire from 1716 to 1717

Hacı Halil Pasha

Grand Vizier of the Ottoman Empire
- In office 21 August 1716 – 26 August 1717
- Monarch: Ahmed III
- Preceded by: Silahdar Ali Pasha
- Succeeded by: Nişancı Mehmet Pasha

Personal details
- Born: Elbasan, Ottoman Empire
- Died: 1733 Crete, Ottoman Empire now Greece

Military service
- Battles/wars: Austro-Turkish War of 1716–18

Hacı Halil Pasha (Ottoman Turkish: حاجی خلیل پاشا; ?–1733) was an Ottoman Grand vizier. His ephitet Hacı means "pilgrim".

== Early years ==
Hacı Halil Pasha was born to a Albanian family in Elbasan and rose through the Bostancı corps. In 1694, he resigned and went to Baghdad (now in Iraq) as the subordinate of the Baghdad governor. In 1711 he was promoted to the overall command of the Bostancı corps (Bostancıbaşı) and in 1716 to the post of beylerbey the Erzurum Eyalet. However he didn't serve in Erzurum due to the outbreak of the Austro-Turkish War of 1716–18, being reassigned to serve in Belgrade (now in Serbia).

== Grand Vizier ==
During the decisive Battle of Petrovaradin on 5 August 1716, the grand vizier Silahdar Ali Pasha was killed. Upon the suggestion of the commanders, the sultan appointed Halil Pasha as the new grand vizier. Next year he campaigned to aid Belgrade, which was being besieged by the Austrian army. However Eugene of Savoy of Austria defeated Halil Pasha and captured Belgrade. After this defeat he was dismissed from the post on 26 August 1717.

== Later years ==
Although he was sentenced to death, he hid himself in Istanbul. On 7 June 1720 he was discovered, but with the help of his partisans he was pardoned. In 1727, he became the governor of the Sanjak of Eğriboz in central Greece, and in the next year he was appointed to the governorship of Crete, where he died in 1733.

== See also ==
- List of Ottoman grand viziers

Political offices
Preceded by Silahdar Ali Pasha	Grand Vizier of the Ottoman Empire; 21 August 1716 – 26 August 1717	Succeeded by Nişancı Mehmet Pasha
