= The Siege of Corinth (poem) =

1816 poem by Lord Byron

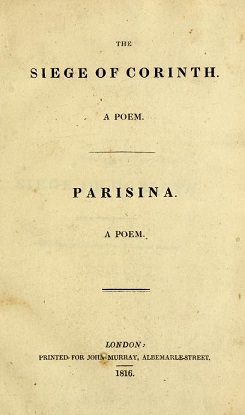
1816 first edition.

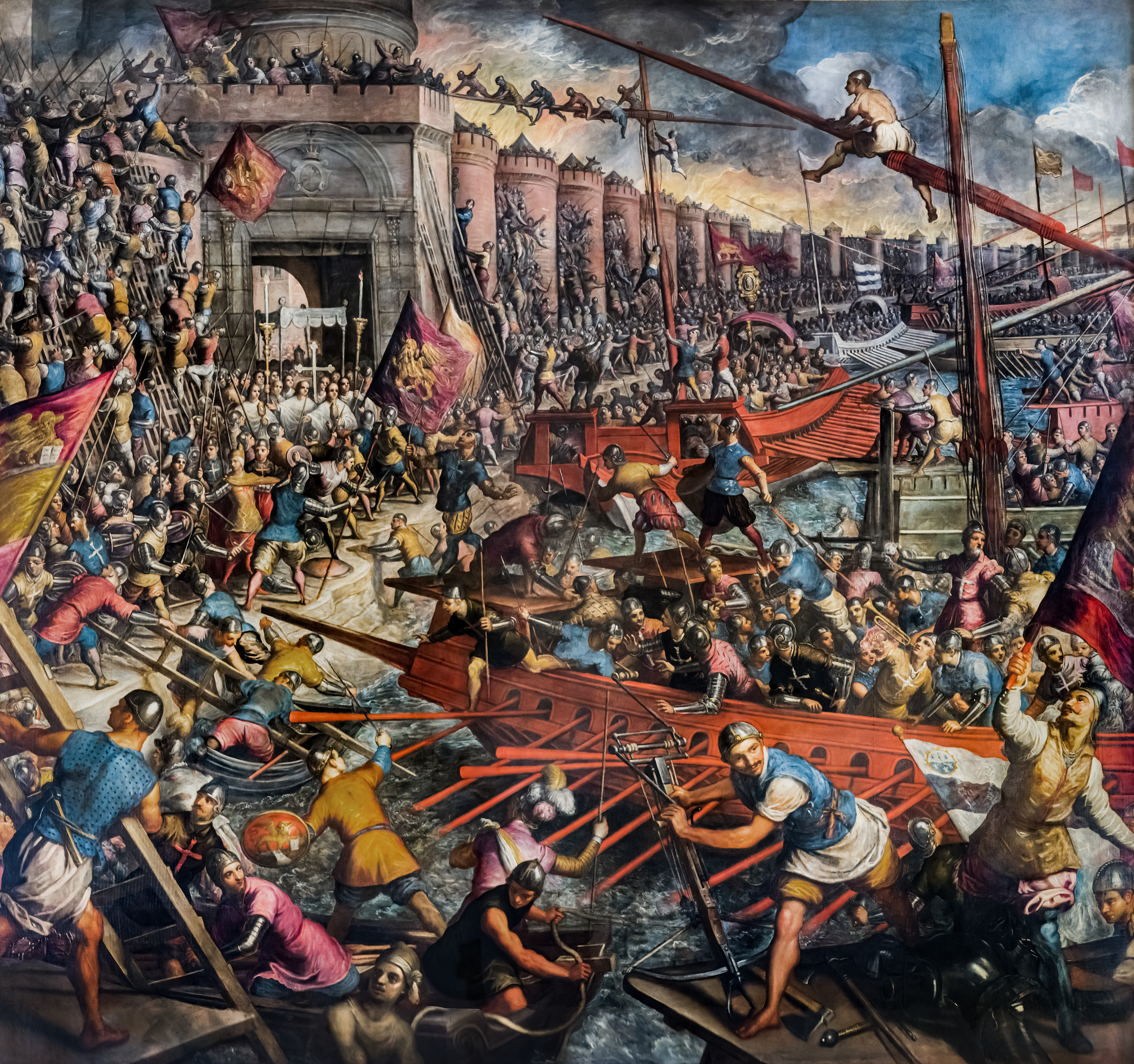
Tintoretto's painting depicting one of the many battles of the Ottoman-Venetian wars.

The Siege of Corinth is a rhymed, tragic narrative poem by Lord Byron. Published in 1816 by John Murray in London with the poem Parisina, it was inspired by the Ottoman massacre of the Venetian garrison holding the Acrocorinth in 1715 – an incident in the Ottoman reconquest of the Morea during the Ottoman-Venetian Wars.

== Overview ==
A "Lion's Mouth" postbox for anonymous denunciations at the Doge's Palace in Venice, Italy.

Byron recounts the final, desperate resistance of the Venetians on the day the Ottoman army stormed Acrocorinth: revealing the closing scenes of the conflict through the eyes of Alp (a Venetian renegade fighting for the Ottomans) and Francesca (the beautiful maiden daughter of the governor of the Venetian garrison: Minotti).

Alp – whose impassioned suit for Francesca's hand had been previously refused by Minotti – had later fled the Venetian Empire after being falsely denounced by anonymous accusers via the infamous "Lion's Mouth" at the Doge's palace (see insert). Enlisting under the Turkish flag, he repudiates both his nationality and his religion, as well as his old name 'Lanciotto', only to be challenged by Francesca herself the night before the final assault to repent his apostasy, to forgive his accusers, and to save the Venetian garrison from certain slaughter.

Alp's ensuing moral dilemma: viz. to forgive those who unjustly accused him and save the lives of his enemies; or to prosecute his revenge on Venice using all the Turkish forces under his command – forms the climax of the unfolding drama as the battle between the Ottomans and the Venetians presses to its conclusion.

== Sources ==
- Drucker, Peter. 'Byron and Ottoman love: Orientalism, Europeanization and same sex sexualities in the early nineteenth-century Levant' (Journal of European Studies vol. 42 no. 2, June 2012, 140–57).
- Garrett, Martin: George Gordon, Lord Byron. (British Library Writers' Lives). London: British Library, 2000. ISBN 0-7123-4657-0.
- Garrett, Martin. Palgrave Literary Dictionary of Byron. Palgrave, 2010. ISBN 978-0-230-00897-7.
- Guiccioli, Teresa, contessa di, Lord Byron's Life in Italy, transl. Michael Rees, ed. Peter Cochran, 2005, ISBN 0-87413-716-0.
- Grosskurth, Phyllis: Byron: The Flawed Angel. Hodder, 1997. ISBN 0-340-60753-X.
- McGann, Jerome: Byron and Romanticism. Cambridge: Cambridge University Press, 2002. ISBN 0-521-00722-4.
- Oueijan, Naji B. A Compendium of Eastern Elements in Byron's Oriental Tales. New York: Peter Lang Publishing, 1999.
- Rosen, Fred: Bentham, Byron and Greece. Clarendon Press, Oxford, 1992. ISBN 0-19-820078-1.
