= Silahdar Damat Ali Pasha =

Grand Vizier of the Ottoman Empire from 1713 to 1716

- Modern portrait of Silahdar Damat

Grand Vizier of the Ottoman Empire
- In office 27 April 1713 – 5 August 1716
- Monarch: Ahmed III
- Preceded by: Hoca Ibrahim Pasha
- Succeeded by: Hacı Halil Pasha

Personal details
- Born: 1682 İznik, Ottoman Empire
- Died: 5 August 1716 (aged 33–34) Petrovaradin, Military Frontier, Habsburg Empire
- Spouse: Fatma Sultan
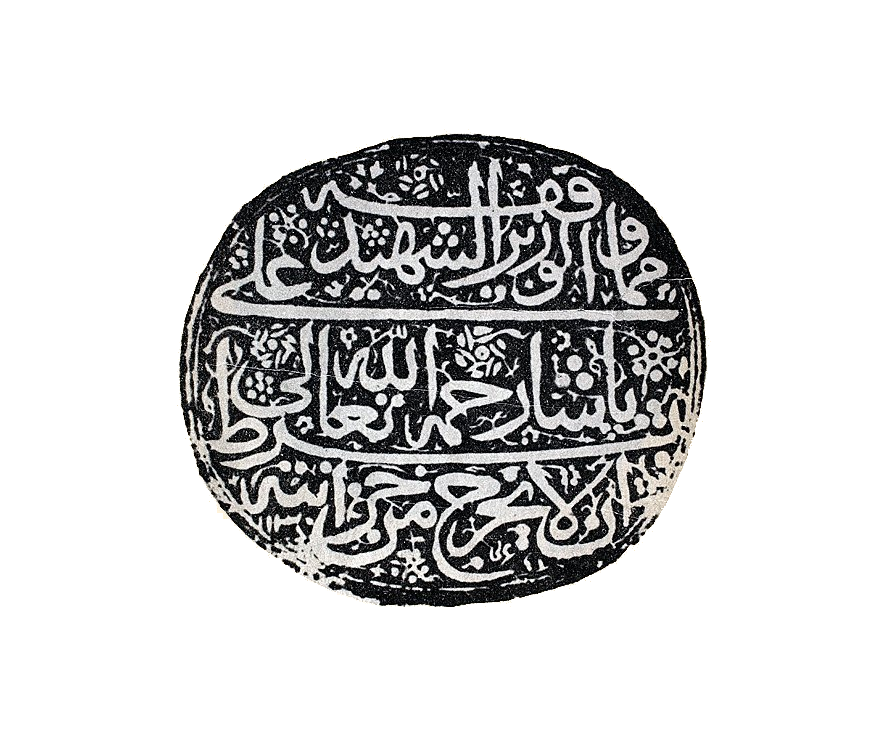
- Seal

Military service
- Battles/wars: Austro-Turkish War of 1716–18; Ottoman–Venetian War (1714–18): Battle of Karlowitz; Battle of Petrovaradin †

Silahdar Damat Ali Pasha (1682– 5 August 1716), also called Silahdar Ali Pasha, was an Ottoman Turk general and Grand Vizier.

== Early life ==
Ali Pasha was born to a Turkish family in Iznik (ancient Nicaea), in modern Turkey. His father's name was Hacı Hüseyin. He was trained in the Enderun palace school in Istanbul and during the reign of Mustafa II he was appointed the personal secretary of the sultan. In 1709, he was engaged to Fatma Sultan, a daughter of Ahmed III, gaining the title damat (English: bridegroom) and was appointed as the Second Vizier. On 27 April 1713, he became the Grand Vizier.

== Term as Grand Vizier ==
Tomb of Silahdar Ali Pasha in Belgrade

Shortly after his appointment, he succeeded in ratifying the Treaty of Pruth with Russia, thus securing the northern frontiers of the Ottoman Empire at Dnieper River.

By early 1714, his attention shifted to the Morea, which had been held by the Republic of Venice since the Morean War and the 1699 Treaty of Karlowitz. The Ottomans had never been reconciled to its loss. When the Venetians gave refuge to Serbian rebels from Montenegro and Herzegovina in their Dalmatian province, and some of their merchants were involved in disputes with Ottoman vessels, the Ottoman Porte (government) swiftly used this as a pretext to declare war.

The subsequent campaign in 1715, led by Silahdar Ali Pasha himself, was an overwhelming success, as the entire Morea fell quickly and with little bloodshed to the Ottoman army.

However, Habsburg Austria, an ally of Venice, also declared war against the Ottomans. In 1716, Ali Pasha moved to the Austrian front. Emerging victorious at the Battle of Karlowitz (2 August 1716), Ali Pasha marched to Petrovaradin. He commanded the Ottoman army against the Austrian forces led by Prince Eugene of Savoy at the Battle of Petrovaradin (5 August 1716). During the battle Ali Pasha lost his life. His tomb is in Belgrade.

After his death he was called Şehit Ali Pasha (Şehit means martyr).

== See also ==
- Damat Ali-Paša's Turbeh

Political offices
Preceded by Hoca Ibrahim Pasha	Grand Vizier of the Ottoman Empire; 27 April 1713 – 5 August 1716	Succeeded by Hacı Halil Pasha
