= Siege of Belgrade (1717) =

Part of the Seventh Ottoman–Venetian War

- Part of the Austro-Turkish War (1716–1718)
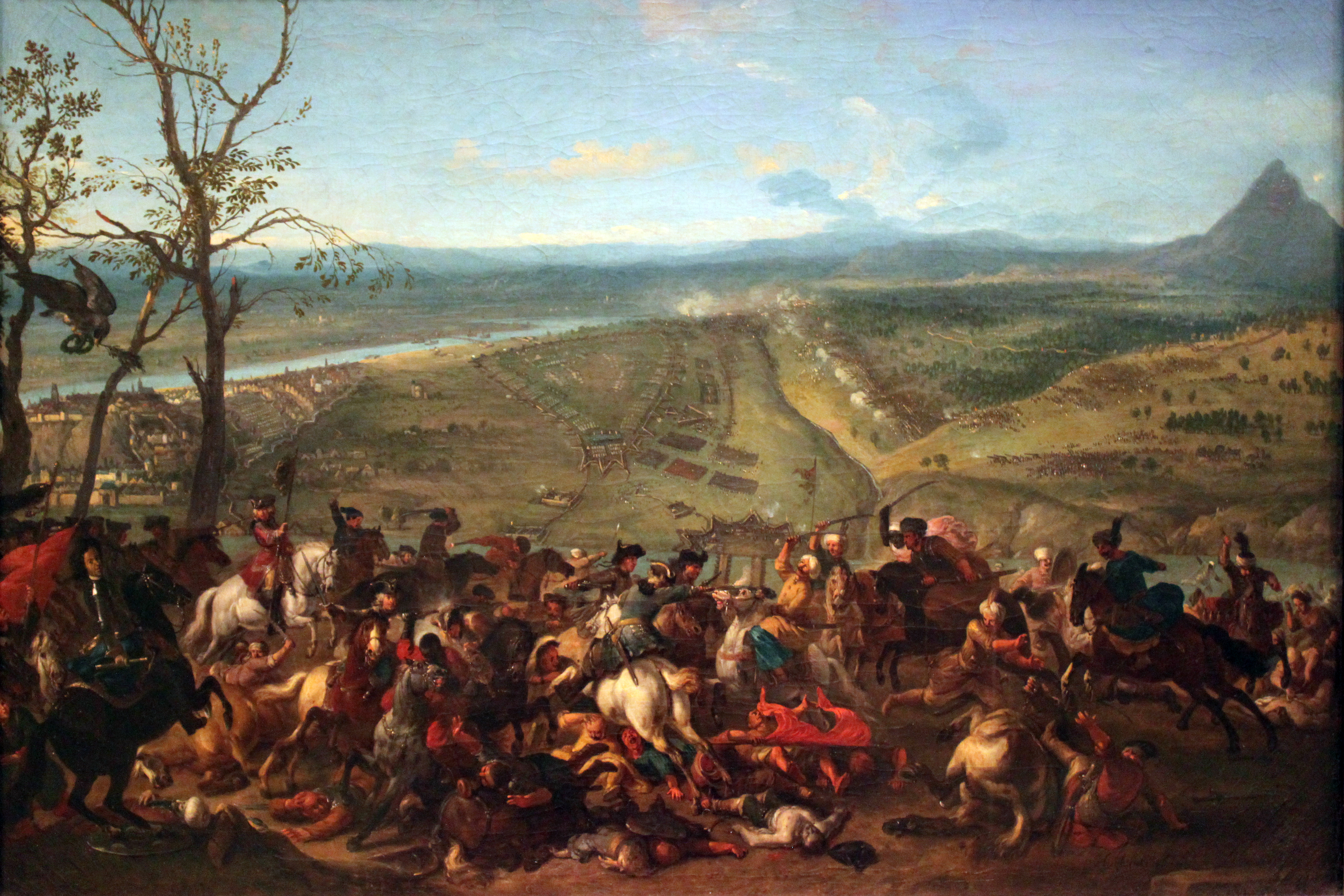
- Siege of Belgrade; Jan van Huchtenburgh, 1720
Date	18 June 1717 – 21 August 1717
Location	Belgrade, Sanjak of Smederevo, Ottoman Empire 44°49′24″N 20°27′01″E
Result	Habsburg victory

Belligerents
Habsburg monarchy: (Habsburg monarchy) Serbian Militia; Electorate of Bavaria	Ottoman Empire: Crimean Khanate

Commanders and leaders
Eugene of Savoy (WIA); Johann Hauben †; Alexander von Württemberg (WIA); Count János Pálffy (WIA); Damian Dalberg †; Antoniotto Adorno; Count von Mercy; Marquis de Maffei	Hacı Halil Pasha; Mustafa Pasha; Rumeli Beylerbeyi; Beylerbeyi Maktulzade Ali Pasha; Beylerbeyi Numan Pasha

Strength
Total: 100,000 men: 87 infantry battalions; 193 troops of cavalry; 200 artilleries; 60 warships	Total: 210,000 men Belgrade garrison: 30,000 men (Note: The Belgrade garrison included 12,000 janissaries, 4,000 albanians levents, 2,000 Tatars and 3,000 sipahis); 600 guns; 70 boats; Relief force: 140,000 Ottomans (Note: The Ottoman relief force included 126,000 janissaries jets, 8,050 warfareists, 4,864 artillery guns, 1,556 artillery gunmen sipahis and armored silahdar); 40,000 Crimean Tatars; 70 warships; 120 guns and mortars

Casualties and losses
30,000 (Note: Habsburg battle casualties included the deaths of numerous Field Marshals, most notably; Johann Hauben, Damian Dalberg, Maximilian Regal, Louis-Godefroi d'Estrades, Achilles Marcilly, and Joseph Lobkowitz. Aside from high-ranking officials, 87 officers and 1767 soldiers; wounded were 223 officers and 3179 soldiers. 30,000 more died of wounds and disease during the siege)	20,000 (Note: 5,000 additional Ottomans died during the siege)

Austro-Turkish War of 1716–18
Battle
2 = Karlowitz & Petrovaradin
Siege
3 = Temeșvar, 5 = Trebinje, 7 = Belgrade
Other
11 = Vučitrn

The siege of Belgrade was the capture by the Habsburg forces under the command of Prince Eugene of Savoy of the strategically-important city of Belgrade from the Ottoman Empire. It took place during the Austro-Turkish War (1716–1718), barely a year after the Habsburg victory at the Battle of Petrovaradin (Peterwardein). The Imperial Army routed the Ottoman relief army under Grand Vizier Hacı Halil Pasha on 16 August. As a consequence, the Belgrade garrison, deprived of relief, surrendered to Habsburg forces on 21 August. Ottoman Sultan Ahmed III sued for peace, resulting in the Treaty of Passarowitz a year later, which completed the transfer of the remainder of Hungary, the Banat of Temeswar with lower Syrmia, and the city of Belgrade with central Serbia into Habsburg hands.

== Background ==
Belgrade was wrested from the Ottoman Empire after the 1688 siege, but already in 1690 the Ottomans recaptured the city. Prince Eugene was seriously wounded during the first siege and now strongly supported the need for a river flotilla on the Danube as being essential for the conquest of Belgrade. The mission of the fleet was to provide assistance and support to the Imperial Army. Eugene managed to enlist the Roman-German Emperor's support, and crews for the ships were hastily recruited in the Netherlands. The allies of Austria were Russia, which limited itself to a prudent line of defense, and Poland; both allies were still militarily engaged in the Great Northern War against Sweden and Charles XII. Meanwhile, the states of the Holy Roman Empire provided only a modest cash contribution and Bavaria joined the side of Austria.

After the success of his 1716 campaign, with the defeat of a much larger Ottoman army at the Battle of Petrovaradin and the successful siege of Temeşvar, Eugene of Savoy had one main objective: the conquest of the fortress of Belgrade. The city, located exactly at the confluence of the Sava river and the Danube, and its fortress, on an arm of the Sava, could only be attacked from the south. Its walls could resist both attacks from the south-east and those from the north-west, and this made it a key to the Balkans for the Habsburgs and Central Europe for the Ottoman Empire.

== Prelude ==
On 14 May Eugene left Vienna sailing down the Danube to Buda. On 15 May he inspected the fortifications for a few hours then left for Futak near Petrovaradin where he arrived on 21 May to meet the bulk of his troops. Before the troops were assembled, Prince Eugene began his march southwestwards towards Belgrade with about 70,000 men. These were reinforced by 5,700 Bavarians, Austrian troops stationed in the Banat, and volunteers from half the royal houses of Europe, including a company of Frenchmen led by the grandson of the late Louis XIV (both Count of Charolais and Prince of Dombes took part in the siege), for a total of about 100,000 men. In addition, Eugene commanded the Danube flotilla, consisting of about fifty boats of various types and ten naval vessels armed with light artillery. Eugene wanted to reach the city and begin the siege as soon as possible before any Ottoman troops could reinforce the city. The biggest problem was that the fortress could not be attacked from the south, and progress could only be made after crossing the Danube and the Sava. He chose the direct route, by crossing the Sava river, although, on this side, the fortress offered its strongest side. On 15 June the Imperial troops reached Pančevo, to the east of Belgrade.

== Siege ==
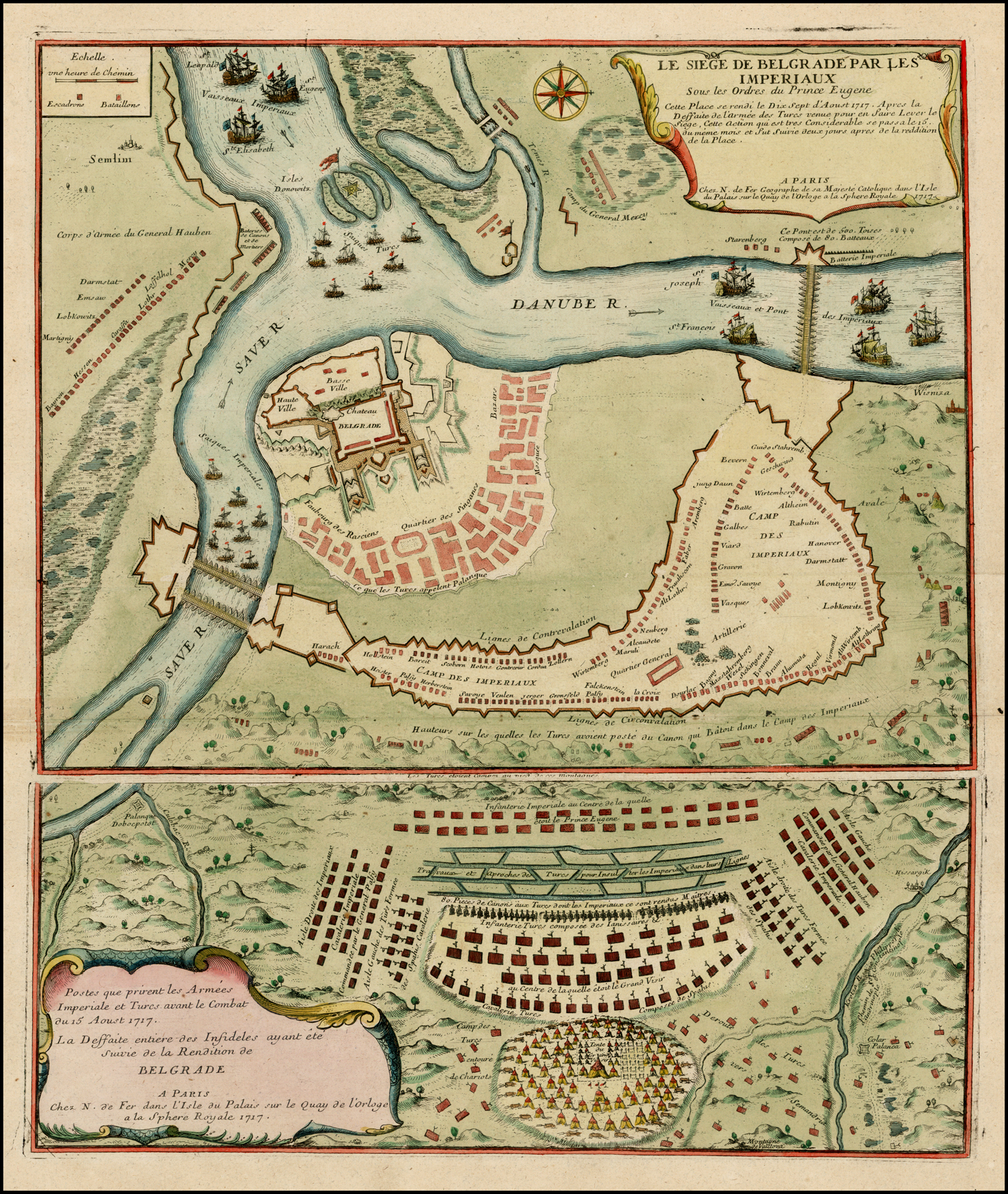
A French map of the siege of Belgrade, showing the fortress and the environs, with the respective positions of the Imperial and the Ottoman armies

On the advice of one of his generals, Eugene chose to cross the Danube, approaching Belgrade from the east and rear, surprising the Ottomans who did not expect the enemy to cross the river at that point. He established the first camp at Višnjica the highest point, some 5 km (3.1 mi) away from Belgrade. On 18 June the city was surrounded. Eugene deployed his artillery while the Imperial troops began digging trenches, in a semicircle from the Danube to the Sava, both in front of the fortress and at the rear to cover the imperials in the event of the arrival of a Turkish relief army. The fortification lines, 16 km (9.9 mi) long, were completed on 9 July providing a connection between the Danube and Sava rivers. The right side of the camp was protected by the Habsburg Danube flotilla. Count von Hauben was sent to establish a bridgehead west of the Sava in order to have a supply and communication route to Petrovaradin and a liaison to Zemun troops.

The Ottoman defenders in Belgrade numbered 30,000 men, under the command of Serasker Mustafa Pasha, who had been commander of the Temeşvar Fortress, one of the best commanders of the Ottomans. Mustafa was ready to fight until reinforcements arrived, bombarding the imperial soldiers from above. Prince Eugene was informed that the huge Ottoman army of about 140,000 men sent to relieve Belgrade was approaching under the command of Grand Vizier (Hacı) Halil Pasha. This army arrived on 28 July. However, instead of taking action against the besiegers, they began to dig trenches. Prince Eugene's troops were caught between the fortress and the relief army in a dangerous crossfire. Because of losses to cannon fire as well as malaria, the strength of the Austrian army slowly diminished. The Ottomans wanted to let the enemy wear themselves down in a long siege. While the situation was rather worrying for the imperial troops, the Grand Vizier chose to wait. When the force of 40,000 Crimean Tatars arrived on 12 August, Halil Pasha, still reluctant to fight Eugene's army, chose to gather another war council instead of attacking.

On 14 August, Belgrade was suddenly shaken by a powerful explosion: a mortar shell launched from Zemun struck the ammunition store inside the fortress killing 3,000 defenders in the explosion. Prince Eugene immediately chose to confront the massive Ottoman relief army. Summoning his commanders for a council of war, he ordered a surprise attack, planned in the smallest details, for the night between 15 and 16 August.

Either I will take Belgrade or the Turks will take me

— Prince Eugene to his generals, 15 August 1717,

According to the war order, the infantry under Field Marshal Charles Alexander, Duke of Württemberg would protect the center, while the imperial cavalry, commanded by Hungarian Field Marshal Count János Pálffy, would cover the left and right wings of the entrenchment. Apart from the 8 battalions, about 10,000 men, left under Field Marshal Count George de Brown (Note: Maximilian Ulysses Browne's uncle) to hold the trenches facing the fortress and four infantry battalions, under Count Peter Josef de Viard protecting the camp and the bridgeheads, the entire army was involved in the attack a total of 52 infantry battalions, 53 grenadier companies, and 180 cavalry squadrons supported by 60 cannons a force of about 60,000 soldiers.

On the Ottoman right side were 10,000 county soldiers under Rumeli Beylerbeyi as well as 20,000 sipahis and armored silahdar, on the left 10,000 province soldiers with the 40,000 Crimean cavalry were commanded by Beylerbeyi Maktulzade Ali Pasha. In the center were 80,000 janissaries, a total of 160,000 soldiers.

The attack started as scheduled before midnight of 15 August, a heavy fog arose covered the battlefield; according to Lieutenant General of Infantry Maffei, the fog was so thick it quickly became impossible to distinguish between friend and enemy; Württemberg advanced the Imperial center with Count Pálffy's cavalry on left and right. The night attack surprised the Ottomans and they woke in panic and confusion; however, several Ottoman infantry battalions managed to corner the right side of Pálffy's cavalry after it lost its way in the fog, already disrupting the order of war. The Ottoman infantry opened fire with support from their left Sipahi cavalry. General Count Claude Florimond de Mercy with the second cavalry line attacked immediately in support of Pálffy, followed by the infantry of Maximilian Adam Graf Starhemberg; the thrust succeeded in pushing the Ottomans back all the way to their trenches. Because of the simultaneous Habsburg cavalry and infantry attack, the Ottomans retreated, leaving their batteries.

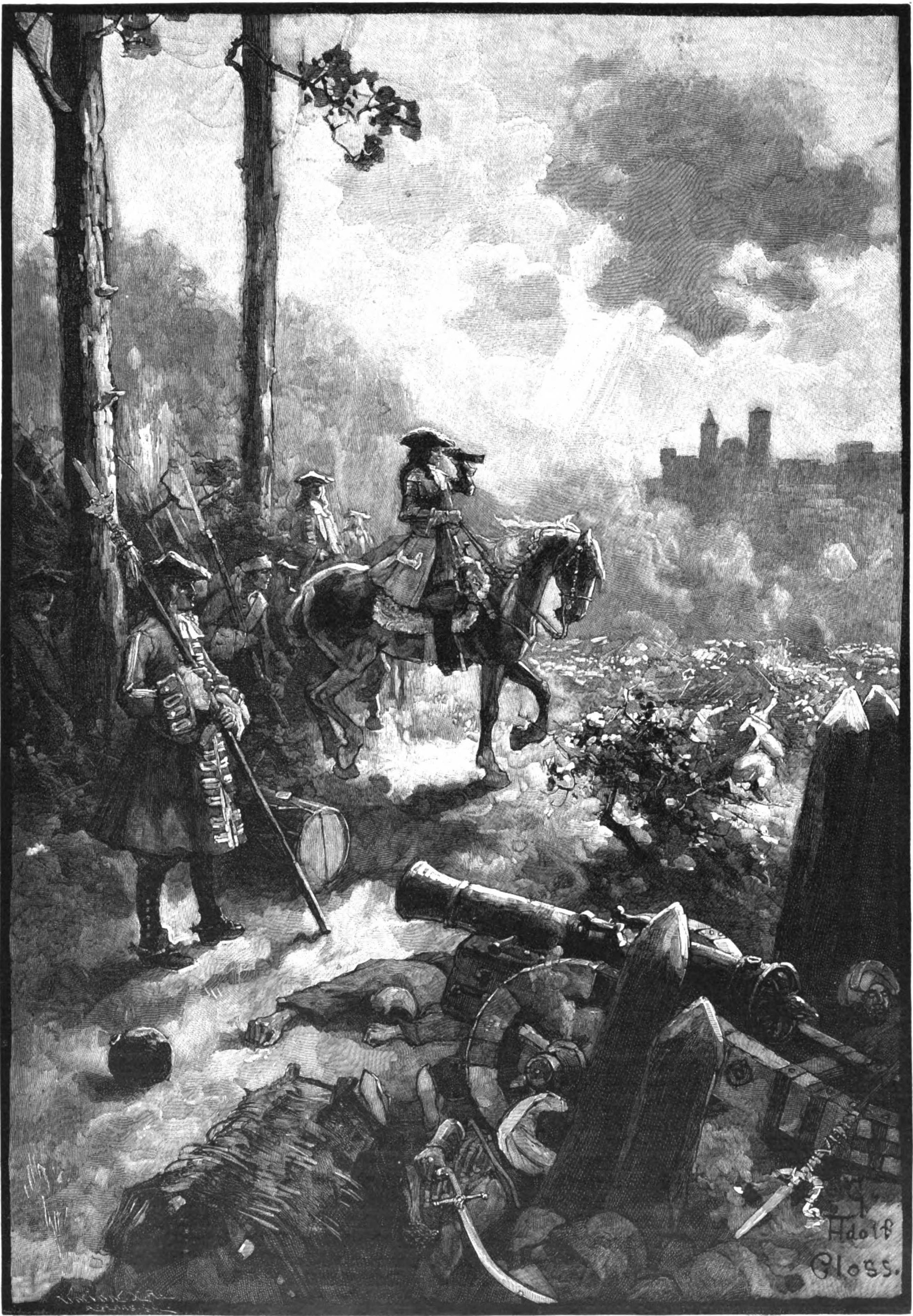
Eugene of Savoy surveying the Battlefield on 16 August 1717

After the first hours of fighting, while the sun rose but the intense fog still covered the battlefield, the Ottomans perceived an opening in the center of the Austrian array and attacked in force. The Ottomans found themselves in between the two wings with a clear advantage but seemed to be unaware of it. Prince Eugene understood that he could turn the situation to his advantage since he could now anticipate the Ottoman battle plan; he ordered von Braunschweig-Bevern's second infantry line to counterattack, placing the Bavarian troops in the front. Then Eugene personally led the attack at the head of the Austrian cavalry reserves. Although Eugene was wounded, his cuirassiers and hussars stormed the flanks of the Ottoman janissaries in a tremendous onslaught. The left and right Habsburg wings managed to finally restore contact with the help of the central infantry. Eugene's attack decision completely changed the situation, not only pushing the enemy back but also taking the trenches, throwing the Ottoman camp into turmoil and causing many soldiers to flee. The Ottoman 18-gun battery on the Badjina Heights was captured and the remaining troops withdrew to the camp, where the Grand Vizier ordered a full retreat.

After 10 hours of fighting, the battle was over. Ottoman losses numbered between 15,000 and 20,000 men, including Erzurum governor Mehmet Pasha, Chief Admiral Ibrahim Pasha and Rumeli governor Vezir şatr Ali Pasha, 5,000 wounded soldiers and all of their 166 artillery pieces. The Austrians suffered fewer than 6,000 losses, Pálffy, Württemberg, and the young Maurice de Saxe were wounded, and Prince Eugene was wounded for the 13th time. (Note: killed included Field Marshal Count Hauben, 87 officers and 1767 soldiers; wounded 223 officers and 3179 soldiers.) The Grand Vizier and the remains of his army escaped first to Smederevo then Niš. They were harassed by Serbian infantry, Serbian militias, Hajduks, and the Habsburg light cavalry made up of Hungarian hussars. The trophies of war included nearly two hundred cannons, one hundred and fifty flags, nine horsetails, and the captured war chest. James Oglethorpe, an aide de camp of the prince, reported that Eugene had a Te Deum performed in the tent of the Grand Vizier on 19 August after taking possession of it.

The garrison, deprived of relief and with soldiers about to revolt, surrendered to the Austrians five days later, on 21 August, in exchange for safe passage from the city, which Eugene granted; 25,000 residents were given the right to freely leave the city honorably. The entire Muslim population, together with the remaining Ottoman garrison troops, left unhurt, taking their basic possessions with them.

== Aftermath ==
Belgrade was transferred into Habsburg Austrian hands after 196 years of Ottoman rule. Prince Eugene crowned his career with a great victory, and the Ottoman dominance in the Balkans suffered a severe blow. A year later, the Treaty of Passarowitz was signed, completing the Treaty of Karlowitz of 1699. Austria obtained at the expense of the Ottoman Empire the Banat of Temesvár which returned to the kingdom of Hungary, Belgrade, northern Serbia, Lesser Wallachia (Oltenia), and other neighboring areas. Austria reached its maximum expansion in the Balkans. Prince Eugene of Savoy crowned his career as the most successful military leader of his time and retired from active military service. After the defeat, the Ottoman Empire would no longer hope to expand in Europe but merely sought to retain conquered territory. Belgrade would remain a territory under the domination of Austria for over twenty years until new Ottoman–Habsburg rivalries resulted in the city being reconquered by the Ottomans.

== Images ==
Siege of Belgrade
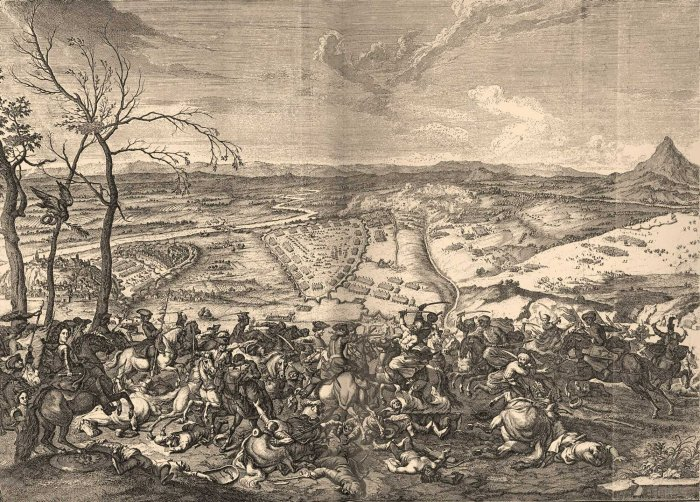
The Battle of Belgrade
by Jan van Huchtenburg

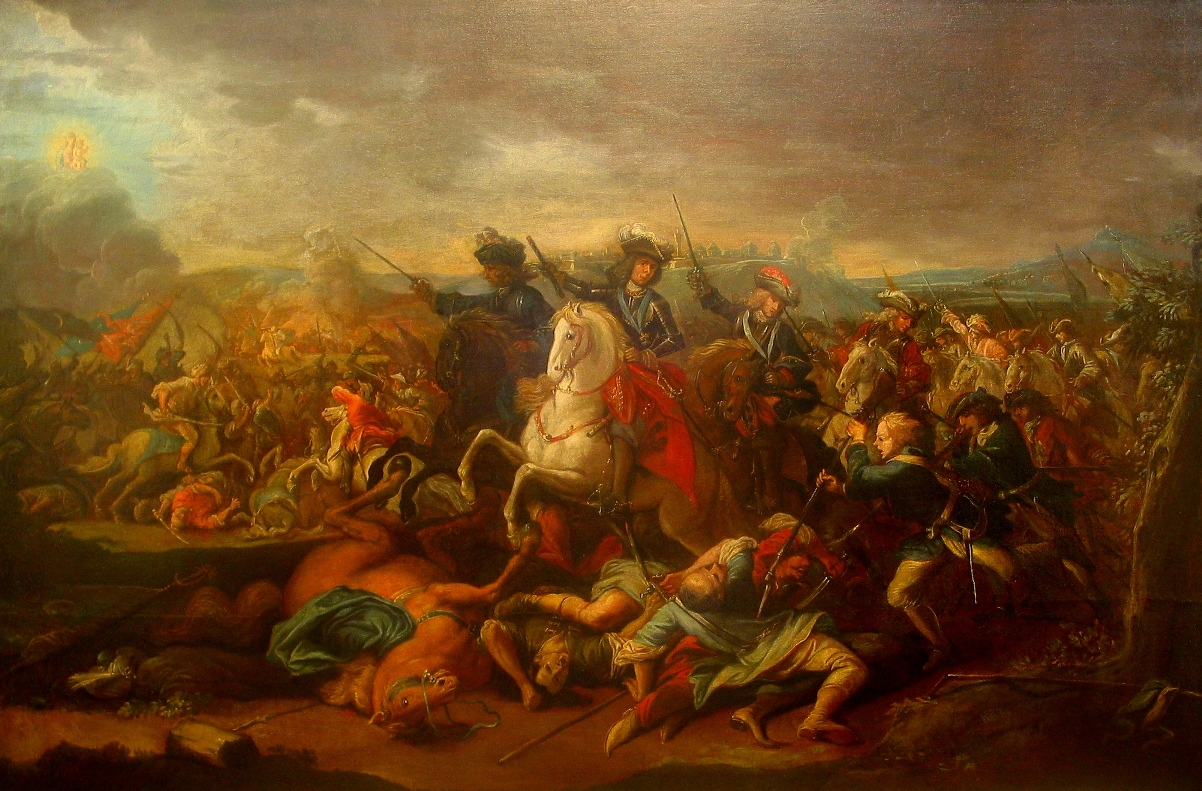
Eugene of Savoy at the Battle of Belgrade
by Johann Gottfried Auerbach

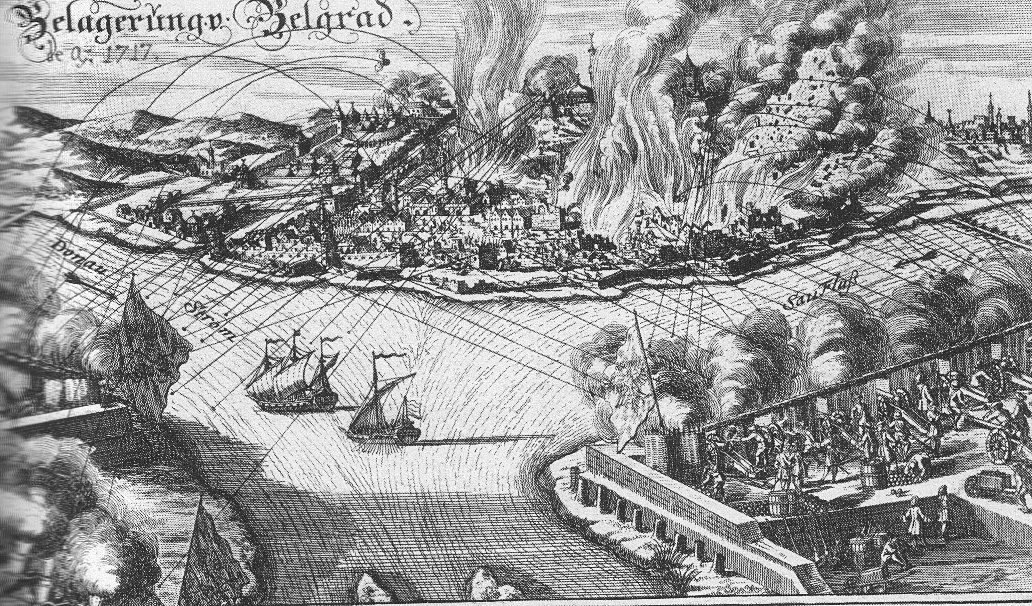
The Siege of Belgrade
engraving

== See also ==
- Ottoman–Habsburg wars
