= Damat Ali-Paša's Turbeh =

Ottoman mausoleum in Belgrade, Serbia

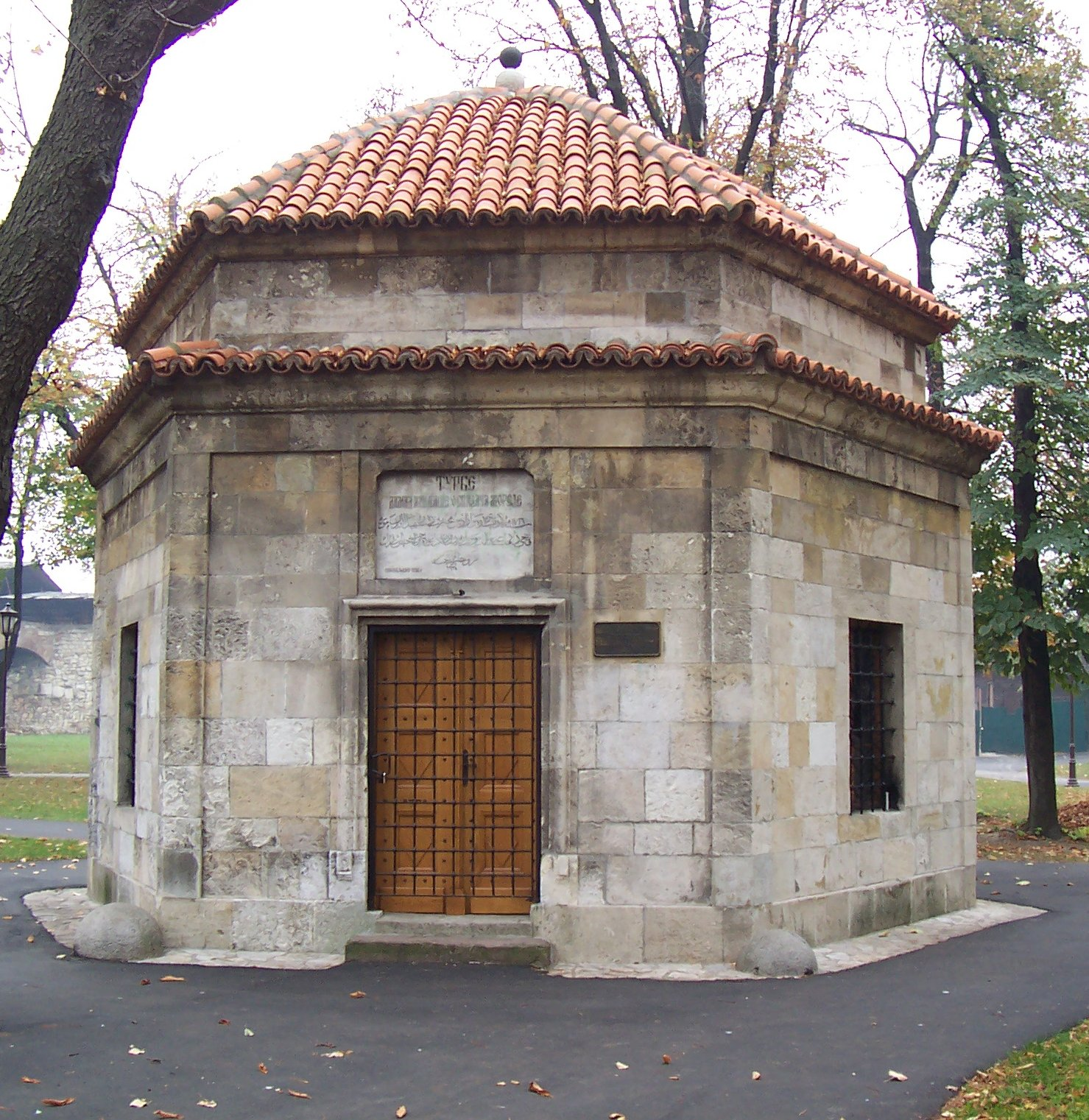
- Erected in 1784. Extensively restored after WWI

- Location within Serbia
- 44°49′24″N 20°26′59″E
- Type: Mausoleum
- Location: Belgrade, Serbia

History
- Established: January 31, 1848

Site notes
- Website: Belgrade fortress

Damat Ali-Paša's Türbeh is an Ottoman mausoleum erected in 1784 in Belgrade, Serbia. It holds the body of the Ottoman general and Grand Vizier Silahdar Damat Ali Pasha. The building is situated in the Upper Town of the Belgrade Fortress. Along with Sheik Mustafa's Tomb, this monument represents one of the only remaining examples of Islamic funerary architecture in Belgrade.

== History ==
After the withdrawal of the Turkish army in 1867, the türbeh served as a storage building and then as a museum of old weapons and trophies. During the bombing of Belgrade in 1915, the portal and one part of the niche where the original inscription was located, were completely destroyed. Soon after that, in 1915, the Austrians began reconstructing the türbeh. The work on the final reconstruction were undertaken by the Municipality of Belgrade in the 1930s. In place of the old, broken plaque with the inscription, a new plaque was set in the niche above the portal.

== Research and scholarship ==
Over the past hundred years, a number of scholarly research publications have appeared relating to Damat Ali-Paša's türbeh. A former clerk of the Turkish embassy in Belgrade, Теvdih Remzi, managed to restore the text of the damaged memorial plaque above the portal of the türbeh and identified the structure as the burial place of Hadži Mustafa Pasha, a Belgrade vizier, murdered in 1801. During his stay in Belgrade during the First World War, 1916–17, Remzi corrected this assertion, with a more precise rendering of the text from the plaque as: "With the effort of Hadži Mustafa Paša, Šehid Ali Paša's türbeh was repaired", thus identifying the türbeh as the memorial to the eminent Turkish commander Damat Ali-Paša. This identification challenged the widespread belief that the türbeh was the burial place of Kara Mustafa Pasha, who, in 1683, after the defeat near Vienna, was murdered in Belgrade by the order of sultan Mehmed IV. During research conducted in 1936–37, and following restoration works on the türbeh conducted by Меhmed Delić on the burial site in the türbeh, a broken scope was found with an inscription on it from 1818/19. The restored text from the scope proves that the structure was originally erected at the burial site of Damat Ali-Paša, and that it was rebuilt in 1818–1819. In a 1977 study of Ottoman architecture in Belgrade, Divan Đurić-Zamolo argued that the structure dated back to 1716–1717; and the architect I. Zdravković concurred with this view. The largest and most detailed study to date was published by Marko Popović in 1991, and demonstrates that the türbeh was erected in 1784 as a memorial to Izzet Mehmed Pasha.
