= Outline of the Ottoman Empire =

Overview of and topical guide to the Ottoman Empire

The following outline is provided as an overview of and topical guide to the Ottoman Empire:

Ottoman Empire – historical Muslim empire that lasted from c. 1299 to 1922. It was also known by its European contemporaries as the Turkish Empire or Turkey after the principal ethnic group. At its zenith from the sixteenth to eighteenth centuries it controlled Southeast Europe, Southwest Asia and North Africa.

== General history ==
=== Main periods ===
- Rise of the Ottoman Empire
- Classical Age of the Ottoman Empire
- Transformation of the Ottoman Empire
- Territorial evolution of the Ottoman Empire
- Ottoman ancien régime
- Decline and modernization of the Ottoman Empire
- Defeat and dissolution of the Ottoman Empire
- Partition

=== Subperiods ===
- Ottoman Interregnum
- Sultanate of Women
- Köprülü era
- Tulip period
- Tanzimat era
- 1st Constitutional Era
- 2nd Constitutional Era

=== Historiography ===
- Ottoman Decline Thesis
- Ghaza thesis
- Renegade thesis
- Historiography of the fall of the Ottoman Empire

== Structure of the Ottoman Empire ==
- Economic history of the Ottoman Empire
- State organization of the Ottoman Empire
- Social structure in the Ottoman Empire
- Culture of the Ottoman Empire
- Science and technology in the Ottoman Empire
- Ottoman Turkish language
- Demographics of the Ottoman Empire
- Religion in the Ottoman Empire
- Socioeconomics of the Ottoman enlargement era
- Millet system
- Ottoman Law
- Porte
- Tughra
- Line of succession to the Ottoman throne
- Military of the Ottoman Empire
- Enderun
- Janissary
- Sipahi
- Cebeci
- Nizam-ı Cedid Army
- Timar
- Nöker
- Ikta
- Eyalet
- Vilayets of the Ottoman Empire
- Sanjak
- Ağalık
- Kadılık
- Salname

== Titles and posts ==
- Sultan
- Grand vizier
- Vizier
- Beylerbey
- Pasha
- Kazasker
- Nisanci
- Defterdar
- Reisülküttap
- Lala
- Aga
- Sanjak bey

== History of Ottoman-ruled countries ==
- Albania
- Algeria
- Armenia
- Bosnia and Herzegovina
- Bulgaria
- Cyprus
- Egypt
- Eritrea
- Greece
- Hungary
- Slovakia
- Iraq
- Jordan
- Kosovo
- Libya
- North Macedonia
- Montenegro
- Palestine
- Saudi Arabia (Parts of)
- Serbia
- Syria
- Sudan
- Tunisia
- Turkey
- Ukraine
- Russia
- Romania

== Ottoman Dynasty ==
=== The sultans ===
- Osman I
- Orhan (Gazi)
- Murad I (Hüdavendigar)
- Beyazid I (Yıldırım)
- Mehmed I (Çelebi)
- Murad II
- Mehmed II (Fatih)
- Bayezid II (Veli)
- Selim I (Yavuz)
- Suleiman I (Kanuni)
- Selim II (Sarı)
- Murad III
- Mehmed III
- Ahmed I
- Mustafa I
- Osman II (Genç)
- Murad IV
- İbrahim (Deli)
- Mehmed IV (Avcı)
- Suleiman II
- Ahmed II
- Mustafa II
- Ahmed III
- Mahmud I
- Osman III
- Mustafa III
- Abdulhamid I
- Selim III
- Mustafa IV
- Mahmud II
- Abdülmecid
- Abdulaziz
- Murad V
- Abdulhamid II
- Mehmed V
- Mehmed VI

=== Some male members of the Ottoman house ===
- Alaeddin Pasha
- Süleyman Pasha
- Şehzade Halil
- Savcı Bey
- Süleyman Çelebi
- İsa Çelebi
- Musa Çelebi
- Mustafa Çelebi
- Küçük Mustafa
- Cem Sultan
- Şehzade Ahmet
- Şehzade Korkut
- Şehzade Mustafa
- Şehzade Bayezid
- Yusuf Izzettin Efendi
- Abdülmecid II

=== Mothers and other women assumed the title Valide Sultan ===
- Malhun Hatun
- Nilüfer Hatun
- Gülçiçek Hatun
- Devlet Hatun
- Emine Hatun
- Hüma Hatun
- Gülbahar Hatun
- Sittişah Hatun
- Gülbahar Hatun
- Hafsa Sultan
- Hürrem Sultan
- Nurbanu Sultan
- Safiye Sultan
- Handan Sultan
- Halime Sultan
- Mahfiruz Hatun
- Kösem Sultan
- Turhan Sultan
- Aşub Sultan
- Muazzez Sultan
- Gülnuş Sultan
- Saliha Sultan
- Şehsuvar Sultan
- Mihrişah Kadın
- Şermi Kadın
- Mihrişah Sultan
- Sineperver Sultan
- Nakşidil Sultan
- Bezmiâlem Sultan
- Pertevniyal Sultan
- Şevkefza Sultan
- Tirimüjgan Kadın
- Gülcemal Kadın
- Perestu Kadın
- Gülüstü Hanım

=== Some female members of the Ottoman house ===
- Hatice Sultan (daughter of Selim I)
- Mihrimah Sultan (daughter of Suleiman I)
- Kaya Sultan
- Hatice Sultan (daughter of Ahmed III)
- Hatice Sultan (daughter of Mustafa III)
- Esma Sultan (daughter of Abdul Hamid I)
- Adile Sultan
- Naile Sultan (daughter of Abdulmejid I)
- Esma Sultan (daughter of Abdülaziz)
- Fehime Sultan

== Notable people ==
=== Some Crimean Khans ===
- Meñli I Giray
- Mehmed I Giray
- Sahib I Giray
- Devlet I Giray
- Mehmed IV Giray
- Islam III Giray
- Adil Giray
- Selim I Giray
- Devlet II Giray
- Şahin Giray

=== Some Grandviziers ===
- Alaeddin Pasha
- Çandarlı Kara Halil Hayreddin Pasha
- Çandarlı (2nd) Halil Pasha
- Mahmut Pasha
- Gedik Ahmet Pasha
- Hersekli Ahmet Pasha
- Karamanlı Mehmet Pasha
- Hadım Sinan Pasha
- Pargalı İbrahim Pasha
- Lütfi Pasha
- Rüstem Pasha
- Sokollu Mehmet Pasha
- Şemiz Ahmed Pasha
- Lala Kara Mustafa Pasha
- Koca Sinan Pasha
- Damat İbrahim Pasha
- Özdemiroğlu Osman Pasha
- Cigalazade Yusuf Sinan Pasha
- Kuyucu Murat Pasha
- Öküz Kara Mehmet Pasha
- Hadım Mehmet Pasha
- Damat Halil Pasha
- Gazi Hüsrev Pasha
- Bayram Pasha
- Tayyar Mehmet Pasha
- Kemankeş Mustafa Pasha
- Sultanzade Mehmet Pasha
- Nevesinli Salih Pasha
- Kara Musa Pasha
- Hezarpare Ahmet Pasha
- Sofu Mehmet Pasha
- Kara Dev Murat Pasha
- Melek Ahmet Pasha
- Abaza Siyavuş Pasha I
- Tarhoncu Ahmed Pasha
- Kara Dev Murat Pasha
- Gazi Hüseyin Pasha
- Köprülü Mehmet Pasha
- Köprülü Fazıl Ahmet Pasha
- Merzifonlu Kara Mustafa Pasha
- Abaza Siyavuş Pasha
- Ayaşlı İsmail Pasha
- Köprülü Fazıl Mustafa Pasha
- Arabacı Ali Pasha
- Çalık Ali Pasha
- Elmas Mehmet Pasha
- Amcazade Köprülü Hüseyin Pasha
- Rami Mehmet Pasha
- Baltacı Mehmet Pasha
- Çorlulu Ali Pasha
- Köprülü Numan Pasha
- Silahtar Ali Pasha
- Damad Ibrahim Pasha
- Hekimoğlu Ali Pasha
- Ivaz Mehmed Pasha
- Nişancı Ahmet Pasha
- Yirmisekizzade Mehmet Sait Pasha
- Koca Ragıp Pasha
- Cezayirli Gazi Hasan Pasha
- Alemdar Mustafa Pasha
- Koca Hüsrev Mehmed Pasha
- Mehmed Emin Rauf Pasha
- Mustafa Reshid Pasha
- Mehmed Emin Âli Pasha
- Mehmed Fuad Pasha
- Midhat Pasha
- Ahmed Vefik Pasha
- Halil Rifat Pasha
- Ahmed Tevfik Pasha
- Mahmud Shevket Pasha
- Said Halim Pasha
- Talaat Pasha
- Ahmed Izzet Pasha
- Damad Ferid Pasha

=== Other notable viziers, governors and soldiers ===
- Black Musa
- Abaza Hasan Pasha
- Abaza Mehmed Pasha
- Gazi Evrenos
- Hacı İlbey
- Lala Şahin Pasha
- Zağanos Pasha
- Tiryaki Hasan Pasha
- Telli Hasan Pasha
- Özdemir Pasha
- Cezzar Ahmet Pasha
- Ali Pasha
- Muhammed Ali of Egypt
- Gazi Osman Pasha
- Ethem Pasha
- Ahmet Cemal
- Enver Pasha
- Ingiliz Mustafa

=== Sea men (Kaptan Pashas) ===
- Kemal Reis
- Piri Reis
- Oruç Reis
- Barbaros Hayrettin Pasha
- Aydın Reis
- Turgut Reis
- Kurtoğlu Muslihiddin Reis
- Salih Reis
- Murat Reis the Elder
- Seydi Ali Reis
- Piyale Pasha
- Kurtoğlu Hızır Reis
- Müezzinzade Ali Pasha
- Kılıç Ali Pasha
- Mezzo Morto Hüseyin Pasha
- Hasan Rami Pasha

=== Architects ===
- Atik Sinan
- Mimar Sinan
- Sedefkar Mehmed Agha
- Mimar Kasım

=== Artists (painter and calligrapher) ===
- Ahmed Karahisari
- Nakkaş Osman
- Hâfiz Osman
- Levni
- Osman Hamdi Bey
- Şeker Ahmet Paşa
- Hoca Ali Riza
- Halil Paşa

=== Musicians ===
- Hafız Post
- Buhurizade Itri
- Hampartsoum Limondjian
- Dede Efendi
- Tanburi Büyük Osman Bey
- Hacı Arif Bey
- Tatyos Efendi
- Tamburi Cemil Bey

=== Poets and authors ===
- Pir Sultan Abdal
- Fuzûlî
- Hayâlî
- Bâkî
- İncili Çavuş
- Nef'i
- Karacaoğlan
- Neşâtî
- Nedîm
- Dadaloğlu
- İbrahim Şinasi
- Agah Efendi
- Namık Kemal
- Tevfik Fikret
- Ömer Seyfettin

=== Men of letters and historians ===
- Aşıkpaşazade
- İdris-i Bitlisi
- Matrakçı Nasuh
- Hoca Sadeddin Efendi
- Mustafa Âlî
- Mustafa Selaniki
- Koçi Bey
- Katip Çelebi
- Evliya Çelebi
- İbrahim Peçevi
- Mustafa Naima
- Osman Aga of Timișoara
- İbrahim Müteferrika
- Silahdar Findiklili Mehmed Aga
- Yirmisekiz Mehmed Çelebi
- Ahmed Resmî Efendi
- Ahmet Cevdet Pasha
- Ziya Gökalp

=== Scientists (including Astrologist) ===
- Şerafeddin Sabuncuoğlu
- Ali Kuşçu
- Orban
- Takiyuddin
- Hezârfen Ahmet Çelebi
- Lagari Hasan Çelebi
- Erzurumlu İbrahim Hakkı
- Müneccimbaşı Ahmed Dede

=== Some families ===
- Balyan family
- Çandarlı Family
- Köprülü family
- Levidis family
- Malkoçoğlu Family

== Buildings ==
=== Palaces (İstanbul) ===
- Adile Sultan Palace
- Aynalıkavak Palace
- Beylerbeyi Palace
- Çırağan Palace
- Dolmabahçe Palace
- Esma Sultan Mansion
- Hatice Sultan Palace
- Ihlamur Palace
- Khedive Palace
- Küçüksu Palace
- Maslak Palace
- Topkapı Palace
- Yıldız Palace

=== Mosques (İstanbul) ===
- Atik Ali Pasha Mosque
- Atik Valide Mosque
- Beyazıt II Mosque
- Dolmabahçe Mosque
- Eyüp Sultan Mosque
- Fatih Mosque
- Firuz Ağa Mosque
- Handan Agha Mosque
- Kılıç Ali Pasha Mosque
- Laleli Mosque
- Mihrimah Mosque
- Mihrimah Sultan Mosque (Üsküdar)
- Molla Çelebi Mosque
- The New Mosque
- Nuruosmaniye Mosque
- Nusretiye Mosque
- Ortaköy Mosque
- Pertevniyal Mosque
- Rüstem Pasha Mosque
- Sinan Pasha Mosque
- Sokollu Mehmet Pasha Mosque
- Sultan Ahmet Mosque (Blue Mosque)
- Süleymaniye Mosque
- Şehzade Mosque
- Şemsi Pasha Mosque
- Teşvikiye Mosque
- Yavuz Selim Mosque
- Yeni Valide Mosque
- Yıldız Hamidiye Mosque
- Zeynep Sultan Mosque

=== Mosques (Elsewhere) ===
- Bayezid I Mosque
- Bursa Grand Mosque
- İzzet Mehmet Pasha Mosque
- Murat Paşa Mosque
- Nasrullah Mosque
- Old Mosque
- Omer Pasha Mosque
- Selimiye Mosque
- Tekeli Mehmet Paşa Mosque
- Üç Şerefeli Mosque
- Ulucami
- Yeşil Mosque

== Military ==
=== Wars ===
- Ottoman wars in Europe
- Ottoman wars in Asia
- Ottoman wars in Africa

==== Croatian–Ottoman Wars ====
- Long campaign (1443–1444)
- Hundred Years' Croatian–Ottoman War (c. 1493 – 1593)
- Long War (1593–1606)
- Great Turkish War (1662–1699)

==== Ottoman Persian Wars ====
- War of 1532–1555
- War of 1578–1590
- War of 1603–1618
- War of 1623–1639
- War of 1730–1735
- War of 1743–1746
- War of 1775–1776
- War of 1821–1823

==== Ottoman–Venetian Wars ====
- Siege of Thessalonica (1422–1430)
- The first Ottoman–Venetian War (1463–1479)
- The second Ottoman–Venetian War (1499–1503)
- The third Ottoman–Venetian War (1537–1540)
- The fourth Ottoman–Venetian War (1570–1573)
- The fifth Ottoman–Venetian War or Cretan War (1645–1669)
- The sixth Ottoman–Venetian War or Morean War (1684–1699)
- The seventh and last Ottoman–Venetian War (1714–1718)

==== Polish–Ottoman Wars ====
- Moldavian Magnate Wars
- Polish–Ottoman War (1620–1621)
- Polish–Ottoman War (1633–1634)
- Polish–Cossack–Tatar War (1666–1671)
- Polish–Ottoman War (1672–1676) (or "2nd Polish–Ottoman War")
- Polish–Ottoman War (1683–1699) (or "3rd Polish–Ottoman War")

==== Russo-Turkish War ====
- Russo-Turkish War (1568–1570)
- Russo-Turkish War (1676–1681)
- Russo-Turkish War (1686–1700)
- Russo Turkish War (1710)
- Russo-Turkish War (1735-1739)
- Russo-Turkish War (1768–1774)
- Russo-Turkish War (1787–1792)
- Russo-Turkish War (1806–1812)
- Russo-Turkish War (1828–1829)
- Russo-Turkish War (1877–1878)

==== Other wars ====
- Byzantine–Ottoman Wars
- Ottoman–Persian Wars
- History of the Serbian–Turkish wars
- Ottoman–Habsburg wars
- Indian Ocean campaigns
- Italian War of 1542–1546
- Italo-Turkish War
- Balkan Wars
- World War I

=== Sieges ===
- Bursa (1326)
- İznik (1331)
- İzmit (1333)
- Edirne (1361)
- Tarnovo (1393)
- İstanbul (1422)
- Thessalonica (1422)
- Svetigrad (1448)
- İstanbul (1453)
- Belgrade (1456)
- Kruje (1478)
- Rhodes (1480)
- Otranto (1481)
- Cairo (1517)
- Rhodes (1522)
- Algiers (1529)
- Vienna (1529)
- Tunis (1534)
- Baghdat (1534)
- Corfu (1537)
- Diu (1538)
- Aden (1538)
- Castelnuovo (1539)
- Buda (1541)
- Esztergom (1543)
- Van (1547)
- Tripoli (1551)
- Eger(1552)
- Oran (1556)
- Oran (1563)
- Malta (1565)
- Szigetvar (1566)
- Tunis (1574)
- Baghdad (1638)
- Candia (1669)
- Vienna (1683)
- Belgrade (1739)

=== Battles (before World War 1) ===
- Bapheus
- Dimbos
- Pelekanon
- Ihtiman
- Maritsa
- Dubrovnica
- Savra
- Bileca
- 1.Kosova
- Rovine
- Nicopolis
- Ankara
- Varna
- 2.Kosova
- Albulena (Ujëbardha)
- Otlukbeli
- Vasliu
- Valea Alba
- Ekmek Otlak (Câmpul Pâinii)
- Krbava
- Zonchio
- Modon
- Chaldiran
- Marj Dabiq
- Yaunis Khan
- Ridanieh
- Mohács
- Formentera
- Preveza
- Algiers
- Sohoista
- Ponza
- Djerbe
- Lepanto
- Çıldır
- Torches
- Sisak
- Keresztes
- Cecora
- Khotyn (1621)
- Focchies
- Dardanelles (1654)
- Dardanelles (1655)
- Dardanelles (1656)
- Dardanelles (1657)
- Saint Gotthard
- Khotyn (1673)
- Vienna
- 2.Mohács
- Slankamen
- Oinousses Islands (Koyun Adaları)
- Andros
- Zenta
- Pruth River
- Petrovaradin
- Imbros
- Matapan
- Hisarcık (Grocka)
- Stavuchany
- Chesma
- Larga
- Kagul
- Fokşan
- Rymnik
- Kaliakra (1791)
- Pyramids
- Abukir
- Arpachai
- Athos
- Al Safra
- Jeddah
- Čegar
- Alamana
- Dragashani
- Dervenakia
- Kamatero
- Navarino
- Kulevicha
- Algiers
- 3.Kosova
- Konya
- Nezib
- Oltenitza
- Sinop
- Kurekdere
- Eupatoria
- Kızıl Tepe
- Plevna
- Shipka
- Tashkessen
- Dömeke
- Tobruk
- Beirut
- Kardzhali
- Sarantaporo
- Giannitsa
- Kumanovo
- Kirk Kilisse
- Pente Pigadia
- Prilep
- Lule Burgas
- Merhamli
- Sorovich
- Monastir
- Kaliakra (1912)
- Imroz (Elli)
- Bulair
- Şarköy
- Adrianople
- Lemnos (Limni)
- Bizani
- Scutari
- Yenidje

=== Battles of the First World War ===
==== Caucasus Campaign ====
- Köprüköy (Bergmann)
- Sarikamis
- Ardahan
- Malazgirt (Manzikert)
- Kara Kilise
- Erzurum
- Trabzon
- Bitlis
- Erzincan
- Sardarapat
- Abaran
- Karakilisa
- Baku

==== Mesopotamian campaign ====
- Fao– Basra
- Qurna
- Es Sinn
- Ctesiphon
- 1st Kut
- Shiekh Sa'ad
- Wadi
- Hanna
- Dujaila
- 2nd Kut
- Baghdad
- Samarra offensive
- Ramadi
- Khan Baghdadi
- Sharqat

==== Sinai and Palestine Campaign ====
- Kanal (Suez)
- Romani
- Magdhaba
- Refah (Rafa)
- 1st Gaza
- 2nd Gaza
- El Buggar
- Birüşebi (Beersheba)
- 3rd Gaza
- Mughar Ridge
- Kudüs(Jerusalem)
- Abu Tellul
- Megiddo

==== Gallipoli Campaign ====
- Çanakkale deniz (Naval operations)
- Arıburnu (Anzac Cove)
- Helles
- 1.Kirte (Krithia)
- 2.Kirte (Krithia)
- 3.Kirte (Krithia)
- Kumkale
- Sığındere (Gully Ravine)
- Anafartalar (Sari Bair)
- Kirte Bağları (Krithia Vineyard)
- Kanlısırt (Lone Pine)
- Suvla
- Kılışbayır (The Nek)
- Conk Bayırı (Chunuk Bair)
- Yusufçuk Tepe (Scimitar Hill)
- Hill 60

=== Treaties ===
- Ottoman–Venetian
- Edirne-Segedin (Szeged)
- Constantinople (1479)
- Constantinople (1533)
- Franco-Turkish
- Adrianople (1547)
- Amasya
- Adrianople (1568)
- Istanbul (1590)
- Zitvatorok
- Nasuh Pasha
- Serav
- Khotyn
- Kasr'ı Şirin (Zuhab)
- Vasvar
- Buczacs
- İzvença (Zurawno)
- Bakhchisarai
- Karlowitz
- Constantinople (1700)
- Pruth
- Passarowitz
- İstanbul (1724)
- Ahmet Pasha
- İstanbul (1736)
- Belgrade
- Niš
- Kerden
- Kuçük Kaynarca
- Aynalıkavak
- Sistova
- Jassy
- Algeria
- Tripoli
- Tunis
- Paris
- Kale’i Sültani (Dardanelles)
- Bucharest
- Erzurum
- Akkerman
- Adrianople
- İstanbul (1832)
- Hünkâr İskelesi
- Kütahya
- Balta limanı
- London (1840)
- London (1841)
- Paris (1856)
- Scutari
- Ayastefanos (Yeşilköy)
- Berlin (1878)
- Cyprus
- Tophane
- İstanbul (1897)
- Ouchy
- London (1913)
- İstanbul (1913)
- Athens
- Erzincan
- Brest Litovsk
- Batum
- Mudros
- Sèvres

=== Revolts and notable events ===
- Sheikh Bedrettin
- Şahkulu
- Jelali revolts
- Beylerbeyi Event
- Abaza rebellion
- Atmeydanı Incident
- Çınar Incident
- Edirne event
- Patrona Halil
- Kabakçı Mustafa
- Charter of Alliance
- The Auspicious Incident
- Serbian revolt
- Greek revolt
- Bulgarian revolt
- Arab revolt
- Atçalı Kel Mehmet
- 31 March Incident
- Babıali raid

== Diplomacy ==
- French Ambassador to the Ottoman Empire
- Polish Jagiellon ambassadors to the Ottoman Empire

== Lists ==
- List of the Ottoman battles in which the sultan participated
- Campaigns of Suleiman the Magnificent
- List of campaigns of Mehmed the Conqueror
- Ports of the Ottoman Empire
- List of foreigners who were in the service of the Ottoman Empire
- List of commanders who died in conflict with the Ottoman Empire

== See also ==
- Wikilala
