= Habsburg–Ottoman war of 1540–1547 =

War between Ottoman Empire and the Habsburg monarchy

- Part of Ottoman–Habsburg wars Little War in Hungary
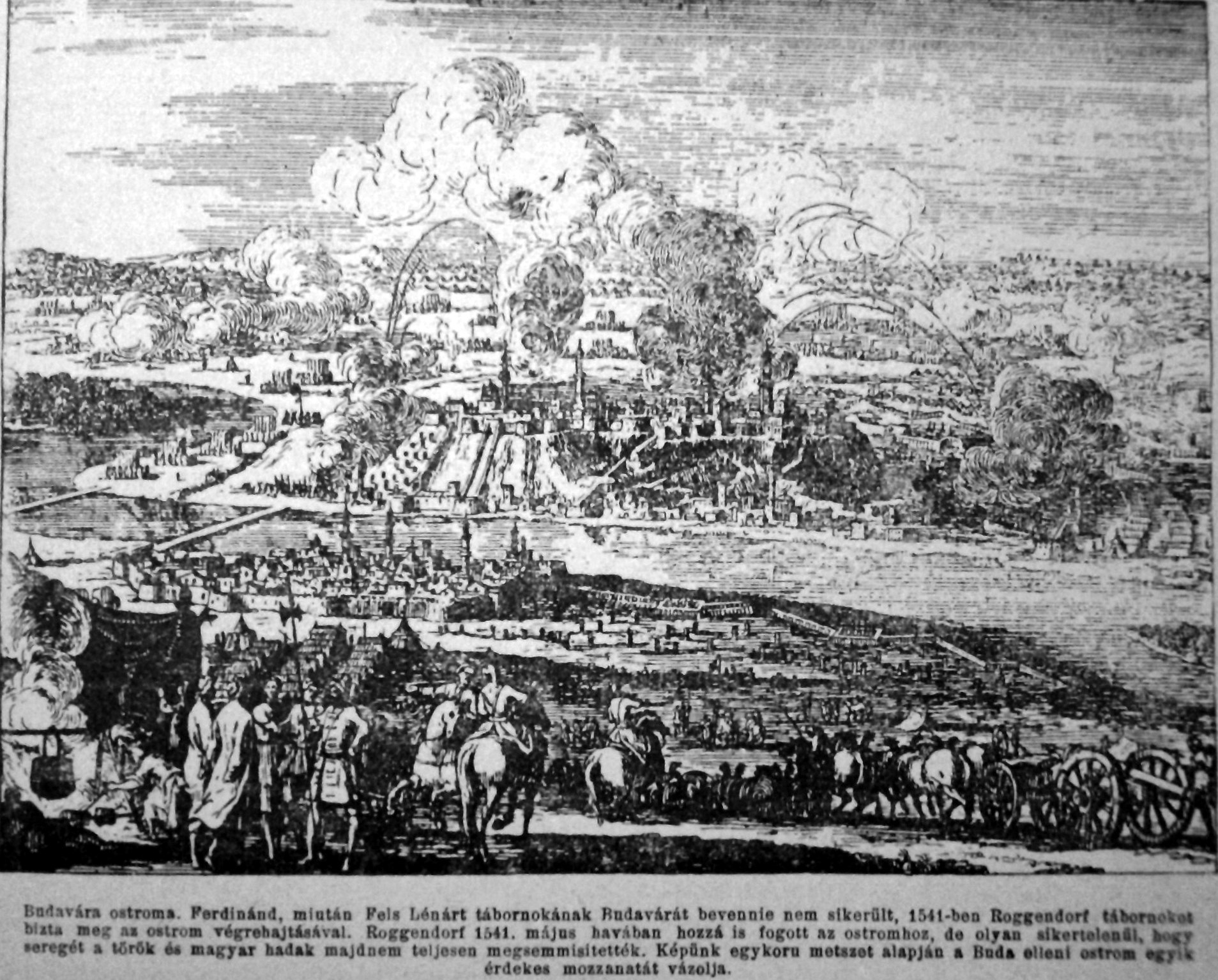
- Siege of Buda in 1541
| Date | 1540–1547 |
| Location | Kingdom of Hungary |
| Result | Ottoman victory |

Belligerents
| Ottoman Empire; Crimean Khanate; Moldavia; Kingdom of France; Eastern Hungary | Habsburg Monarchy; Holy Roman Empire; Kingdom of Hungary; Papal States; Republic of Ragusa; Republic of Venice; Kingdom of Croatia; Kingdom of Bohemia; Spanish Empire |

Commanders and leaders
| Suleiman I Hadim Suleiman Pasha; Devlet I Giray; Petru Rareș; George Martinuzzi; Bálint Török; John Zápolya; Şehzade Mehmed; Selim II; Şehzade Bayezid; Rüstem Pasha | Ferdinand I Wilhelm von Roggendorf (DOW); Nikola IV Zrinski; Alessandro Vitelli; Hans von Ungnad; Joachim Brandenburg |

Strength
| 93,000 | 1540: 7,300; 1541: 28,800; 1542: 54,600; 1543: 16,000 |

Casualties and losses
| Unknown | Heavy |

The Habsburg–Ottoman war of 1540–1547 was a conflict between the Ottoman Empire and the Habsburg monarchy supported by their vassals. The war ended in Ottoman victory in 1547 after signing the peace of Edirne.

== Background ==
The Ottoman Empire, under the reign of Sultan Suleiman the Magnificent, had emerged as a formidable force stretching across Asia, Africa, and Europe. With a military prowess that struck fear into the hearts of its adversaries, the Ottomans set their sights on expanding deeper into Central Europe. In contrast, the Habsburg Monarchy, led by Emperor Charles V, stood as a sprawling conglomerate of territories, with the Kingdom of Hungary becoming the crucible of imperial competition.

Religious fault lines further fueled the conflict, as the Ottoman Empire, a Sunni Islamic power, clashed with the predominantly Catholic Habsburgs. The Kingdom of Hungary, a diverse region home to various religious and ethnic groups, became the epicenter of this religious and geopolitical tug-of-war.

== War ==
The initial stages of the war were marked by a series of skirmishes and border conflicts, with both empires jockeying for strategic advantage. The Battle of Güns in 1537 set the stage, as Ottoman forces, led by Grand Vizier Rüstem Pasha, clashed with the Habsburgs, led by Nikola Šubić Zrinski. These early engagements highlighted the intricate dance of military tactics, with Ottoman artillery and Janissary infantry confronting Habsburg Landsknechts and innovative infantry formations.

=== Fall of Buda ===
The army of Sultan Suleiman the Magnificent occupied the castle of Buda on 29 August 1541. In fact, the Turks had decided to seize the capital of Hungary because King John Zápolya died and his newborn son, János Zsigmond was under the care of Queen Isabela who was attempting to side with the Habsburgs. Suleiman didn’t trust her and after defeating the Habsburg army that was besieging Buda, he marched into the castle in order to oppose the Habsburgs’ future attacks.

The Siege of Esztergom followed the failed attempt by Ferdinand I of Austria to recapture Buda in 1542. However, Suleiman refrained from moving further on to Vienna this time, apparently because he had no news of the campaigns of his French allies in western Europe and in the Mediterranean.

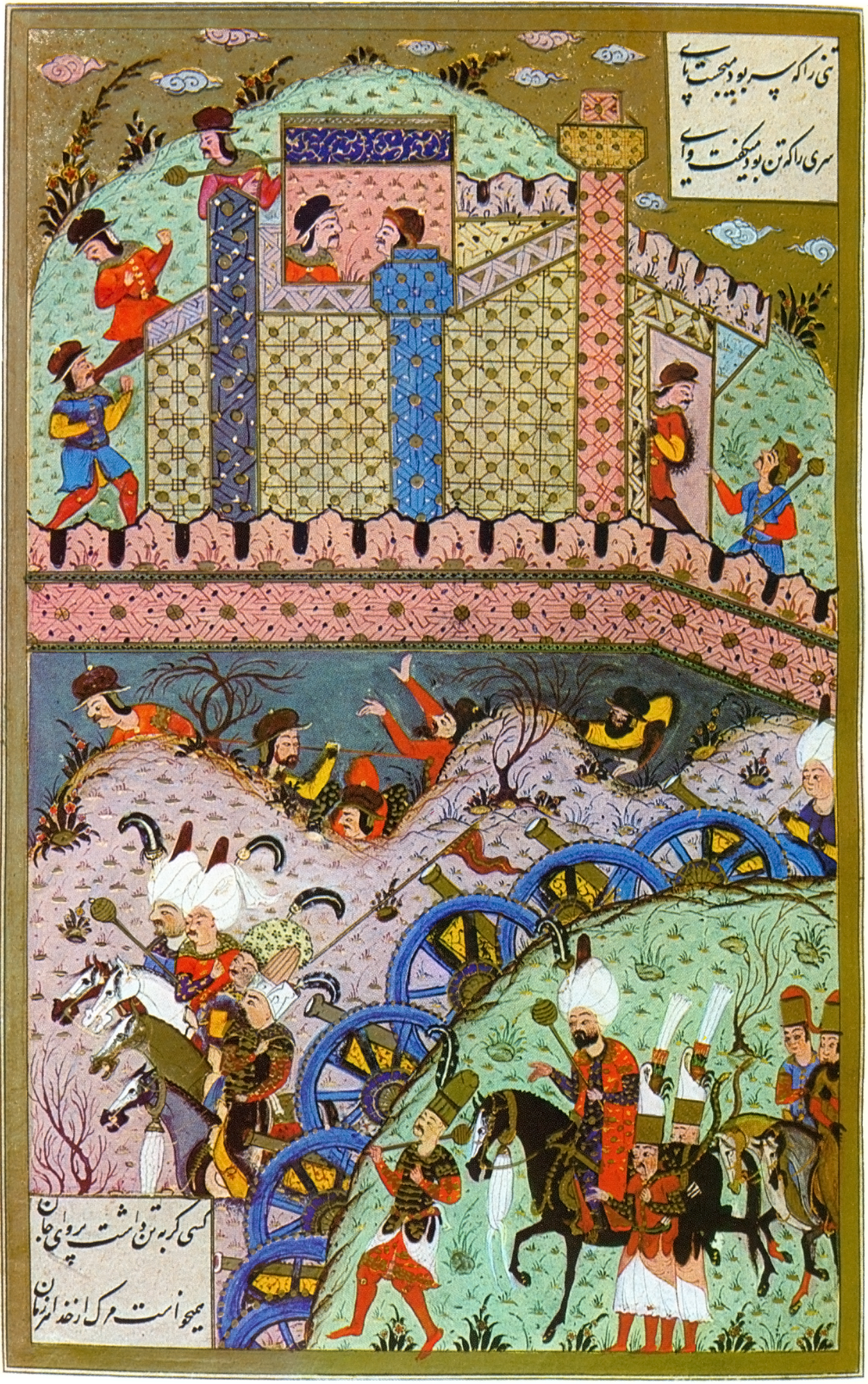
Suleiman arrives to the Siege of Székesfehérvár

=== Fall of Székesfehérvár ===
In April 1543 Suleiman launched another campaign in Hungary, bringing back Bran and other forts so that much of Hungary was under Ottoman control. As part of a Franco-Ottoman alliance, French troops were supplied to the Ottomans in Hungary; a French artillery unit was dispatched in 1543–1544 and attached to the Ottoman Army. In August 1543, the Ottomans succeeded in the siege of Esztergom. The siege was followed by the capture of the Hungarian coronation city of Székesfehérvár in September 1543. Other cities that were captured during this campaign were Siklós and Szeged, in order to better protect Buda. However, continuous delay of the push toward the west, because of the siege of these fortresses, meant that the Ottomans could not launch any new offensive against Austria.

After the successful Ottoman campaign, a first truce of one year was signed with Charles V in 1545, through the intermediary of Francis I of France. Suleiman himself was interested in ending the hostilities, as he had a campaign going on in Persia as well, the Ottoman–Safavid War (1532–1555).

In 1544, Suleiman was called east by another conflict, as war with Persia resumed. However, the military superiority of the Turks prevailed even without the sultan. The army of Yahyaoğlu, Mehmed Pasha of Buda, together with the troops of the other Beys, was just enough to carry out further conquests in the further stages of the war. The significant military superiority of the Ottoman army is indicated by the fact that Mehmed conquered Tolna by the end of 1545, which he completed with the complete subjugation of Döbrököz and the capture of Ozora, Simontornya and Tamasi. For Imre Werbőczy, who was in charge of the defense of Tolna, this was an extremely big blow, because as a fierce enemy of the Ottomans, he used all his strength to weaken and hinder the Turkish expansion. With the loss of Tolna, he was deprived of his most important base, so from then on he could not act as effectively against the Turks as he had done before.

Among Mehmed Pasha's conquests, the capture of Visegrád and the fall of Hatvan and Nógrád to the Turks on the other side of the Danube should be highlighted, the guard of the former fled to Eger after setting fire to the palisade, while Visegrád was given up by Péter Amádé after running out of drinking water.

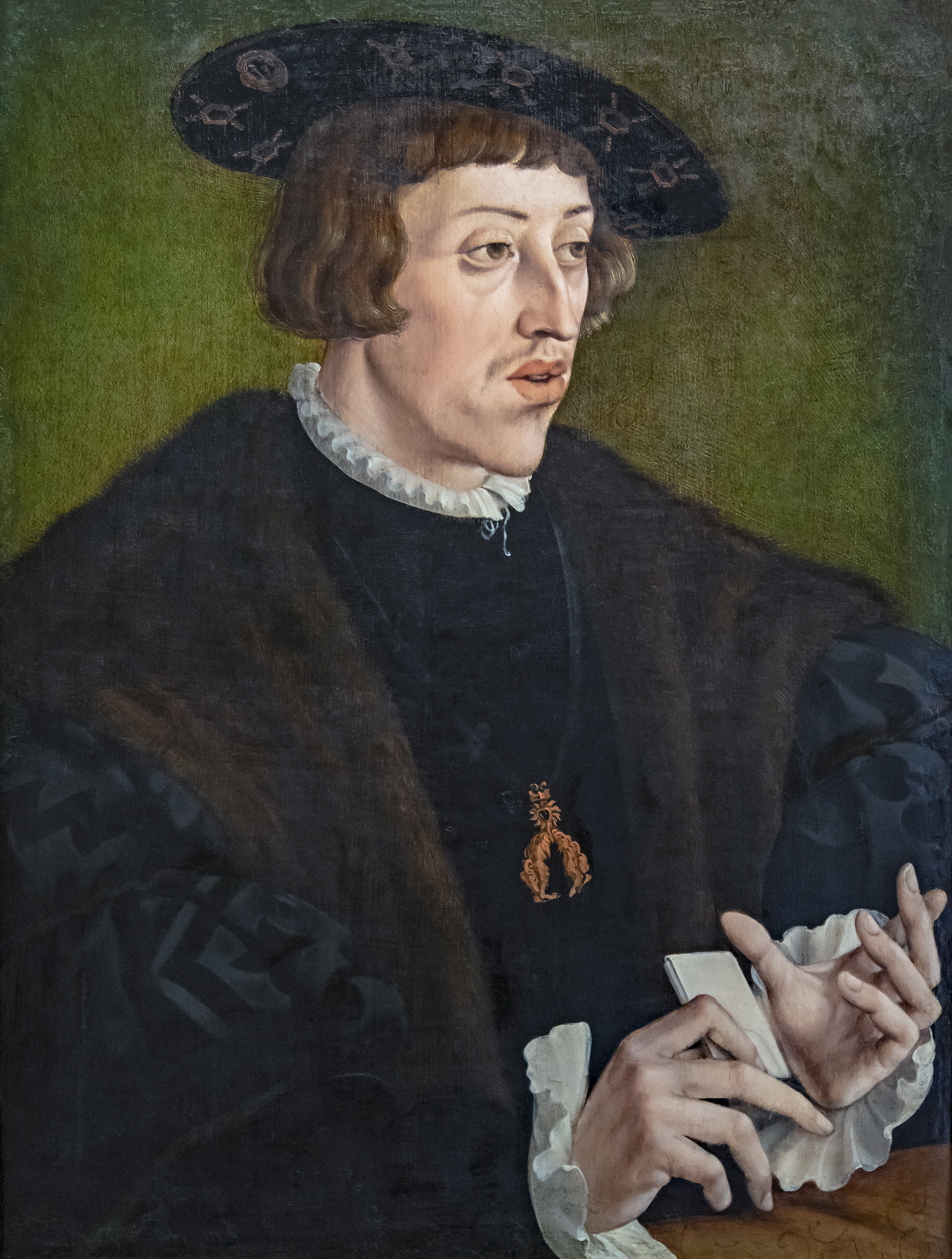
Ferdinand I, Holy Roman Emperor

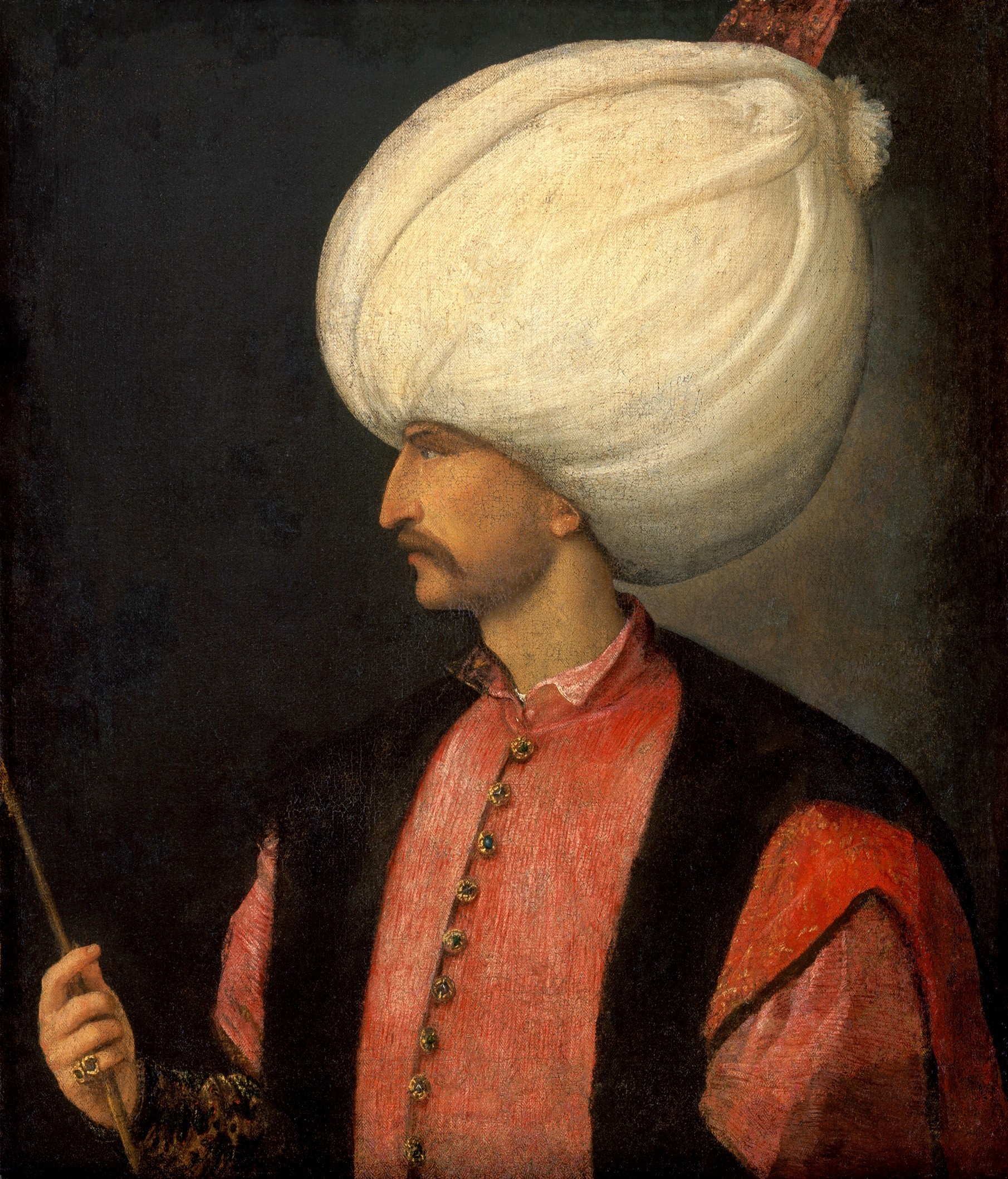
Sultan Suleiman the Magnificent

To raise a relief army, the 1544th Army was formed. There was not a single case of fighting in the years.

Turkish attacks continued in Croatia. After capturing Velika, Bosnian Pasha Ulema defeated the Croatian-German troops coming to relieve him, led by Nikola Zrinski.

On the Christian side, we know of only one or two successful clashes in the country. One was the battle near Somlóvásárhely, where the cavalry coming from Győr drove away the Tatars fighting on the side of the Sultan, and another near Szalka, where the army of the Beg of Esztergom was defeated by the illustrious armies of György Thurzó.

== Aftermath ==
The sultan needed peace on the western front of his empire because he wanted to launch a campaign against the Persians. However, Sultan Suleiman demanded a high price for peace with Ferdinand who had to pay a humiliating sum of 30,000 gold Forints in exchange for governing Western Hungary that the sultan “mercifully ceded him”. It was much higher than the tax paid by Martinuzzi to the Sublime Porte. The Treaty of Edirne originally was set for five years but Ferdinand broke it in 1549 when he made a secret treaty with Martinuzzi about taking over Transylvania.

The Turks enforced their occupation of Croatia and Hungary, while the archduke paid taxes for the rest of the territory. The peace gave Ferdinand some time to establish a defensive line, some kind of border fortress system, because he had no other chance of stopping the Turks.
