= Bombardment of Chios (1681) =

- Part of the French–Tripolitania War
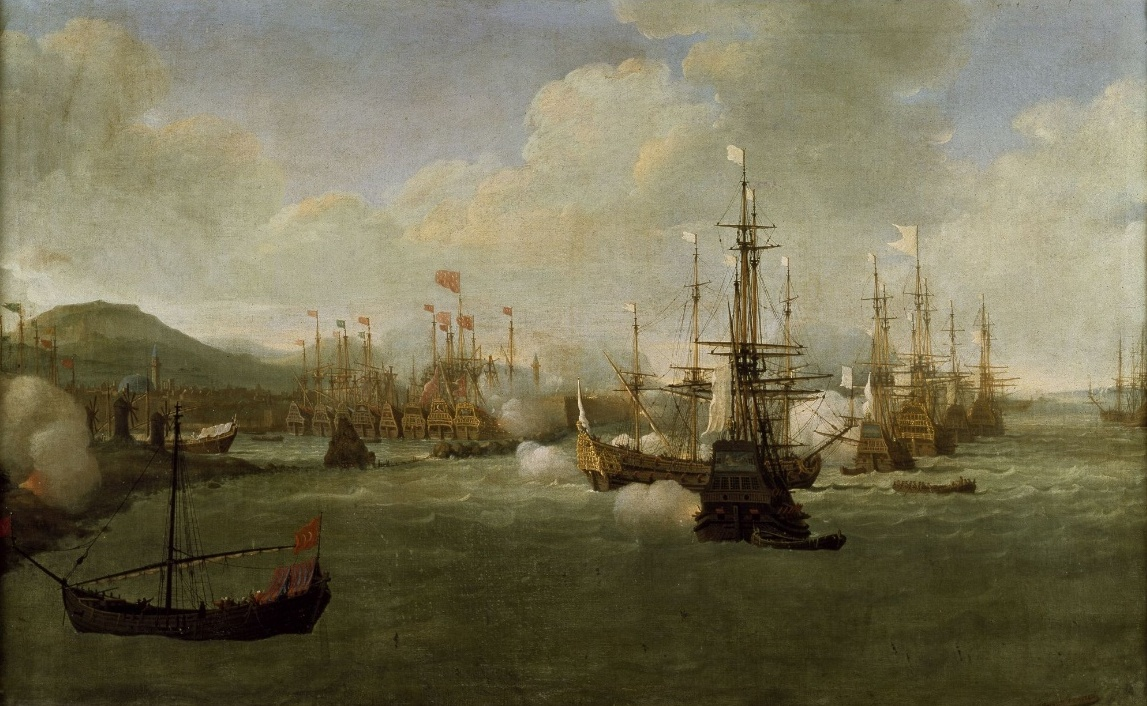
- Bombardment of Chios by the fleet of Admiral Duquesne in 1681
Date	23 July 1681
Location	Chios, Aegean Sea
Result	Indecisive: Peace signed with Tripolitanian captains; Peace rejected on their return to Tripoli

Belligerents
Kingdom of France	Ottoman Empire

Commanders and leaders
Admiral Duquesne	Bozoklu Mustafa Pasha

Strength
18 warships	33 galleys

The Bombardment of Chios, was a diplomatic crisis that occurred between the Ottoman Empire and the Kingdom of France in 1681.

In response to the damage caused by the French fleet under the command of Abraham Duquesne by bombarding Chios on July 23, 1681 under the pretext of pursuing the ships of Tripoli, the Ottoman navy under the command of Bozoklu Mustafa Pasha blockaded the French fleet. Then, the King of France Louis XIV sent valuable gifts to the Sultan Mehmed IV as compensation on May 17, 1682.

== Battle ==
While France was continuing its fight against the piracy activities of the Barbary states (Tripoli, Tunis and Regency of Algiers) affiliated with the Ottoman Empire, the French fleet of 6 ships (4 of which were galleons) under the command of Abraham Duquesne, which left the port of Toulon in 1681, joined other French ships in the Mediterranean and entered the Aegean Sea in order to follow the Tripolitanian ships. Following the clash near Cuha Island on 6 June 1681, the French fleet pursued 6 Tripolitanian ships that had taken refuge in Chios, and when the French fleet approached the port of Chios on 23 July, it found 8 Tripolitanian ships that had captured 2 French ships.

After anchoring at the mouth of the Chios harbor with his fleet of 18 ships with friendly flags, Duquesne suddenly raised the war flags on July 23 and, in addition to the Tripolitanian ships, rained down approximately 4,000 cannonballs on the castle and the city in 4.5 hours, damaging many houses and mosques, while 60-80 Muslims and 50 Christians from the civilian population died and approximately 800 people were injured.

When this news reached Istanbul, the Ottoman government sent a fleet under the command of Kapudan Pasha Bozoklu Mustafa Pasha to Chios. The Ottoman fleet, consisting of 33 galleys, reached the region on August 7 and blockaded the port and the French fleet.

Simultaneously, after the ambassador of the Kingdom of France in Istanbul, Count Joseph de Guilleragues, was reprimanded by the Ottoman government, Grand vizier Kara Mustafa Pasha also demanded that the King of France Louis XIV immediately pay a fine and compensation. The French ambassador was imprisoned for giving evasive answers and was released after six months of detention after giving assurances of a fine and compensation. Bozoklu Mustafa Pasha also stayed in Chios for five months until the guarantee for compensation for the damage was received and held the French fleet hostage.

== Aftermath ==
The gifts and compensation promised by the French Ambassador and sent by the King of France Louis XIV reached the Ottoman Palace approximately 10 months after the Chios Incident (May 17, 1682) and were presented to the Sultan Mehmed IV. The compensation included the "dime" of those who died, according to the survey conducted by Bozoklu Mustafa Pasha regarding the damage caused by the bombardment of the French fleet.

As a result of the agreement reached, the Tripoli ships also released the two French ships they had captured and the prisoners.

After this unilateral aggression that could even necessitate a declaration of war, the Ottoman Empire found it more appropriate to resolve the issue peacefully, since it considered the Kingdom of France to be one of its old friends.
