= Siege of Belgrade (1693) =

1693 siege of Belgrade during the Great Turkish War

- Part of the Great Turkish War
Date	31 July 1693 – 17 September 1693 (1 month, 2 weeks and 3 days)
Location	Belgrade, Ottoman Empire, today Serbia
Result	Ottoman victory

Belligerents
Habsburg monarchy	Ottoman Empire

Commanders and leaders
(Holy Roman Empire) Charles Eugène de Croÿ	Bozoklu Mustafa Pasha; Cafer Pasha

Strength
30,000	9,000

Casualties and losses
8,000	Unknown

The siege of Belgrade in 1693 was a failed siege by the Habsburg monarchy during the Great Turkish War.

== The siege ==
In the summer of 1693, the Duke of Croy was given supreme command of the imperial troops in Hungary. On 5 July, a Turkish army under the grand vizier Bozoklu Mustafa Pasha set out from Edirne against Transylvania. Croy therefore decided to attack the strategically important fortress of Belgrade in order to lure the Turkish army away from Transylvania. The Ottomans had only recaptured the fortress in 1690 and renovated the fortifications in 1692 under Grand Vizier Çalık Ali Pasha.

Croy began the siege on 31 July with around 28,000 men. The garrison consisted of up to 12,000 Turks under Ca’fer Pasha. The Austrians were still waiting for reinforcements. They first crossed the Sava using a bridge built from the Gypsy Island. They then entrenched themselves near the village of Bisniza, out of range of the fortress's cannons. The Duke had received good information from the architect of the fortress, Andrea Cordona, but not all of it. He continued to wait for instructions from the Imperial War Council. On 14 August, the Turks made a successful sortie, and the field marshal was only just able to regroup his army.

The siege guns did not arrive until 26 August, and the Danube ships announced for May only on 1 September. But there were far too few of them; the Turkish fleet was about 10 times larger.

The relief army under the grand vizier Bozoklu Mustafa Pasha was also reported to be approaching. Croy wanted to save his honor and attempted all out assault. The attack on the night of 17 September however failed, not surprisingly. After suffering serious losses, the Austrians began to retreat to Petrovaradin Fortress. The army was pursued by Tatar horsemen and a battle broke out two hours before Petrovaradin, in which the Austrians lost their prisoners and their loot.

== Aftermath ==
After the besiegers withdrew, the fortifications were repaired and new bastions were built on the Sava by the Turks.

The siege had been a failure. The only positive outcome was that the grand vizier’s army did not advance to Transylvania, but had been diverted towards Belgrade.

== Sources ==
- Hans Eggert Willibald von der Lühe, Militair-Conversations-Lexicon, Band 1, p. 486
- Glücks- und Unglücksfälle der Haupt-Vestung Belgrad oder Griechisch-Weissenburg, p. 31
- Gaston Bodart, Militär-historisches Kriegs-Lexikon (1618–1905), p. 118
- Ignaz Aurelius Fessler, Die Zeit der Könige von Rudolf I. bis Leopold I. 1576–1705, p. 493
