= Merzifonlu =

Merzifonlu or Merzifoni is a prefix or epithet for persons from the Merzifon district of Turkey. Notable people with the epithet include:

- Merzifonlu Kara Mustafa Pasha (1634–1683), Ottoman grand vizier
- Merzifonlu Hacı Çalık Ali Pasha (died 1698), Ottoman grand vizier
- Merzifonlu Gül Baba (died 1541), Ottoman Bektashi poet
