= Mehmed II's campaigns =

List of the campaigns carried out by the Ottoman sultan Mehmed II

Campaigns of Mehmed the Conqueror سفر همايون / Sefer-i humāyūn
- Part of the Ottoman wars in Europe and the Ottoman wars in the Near East
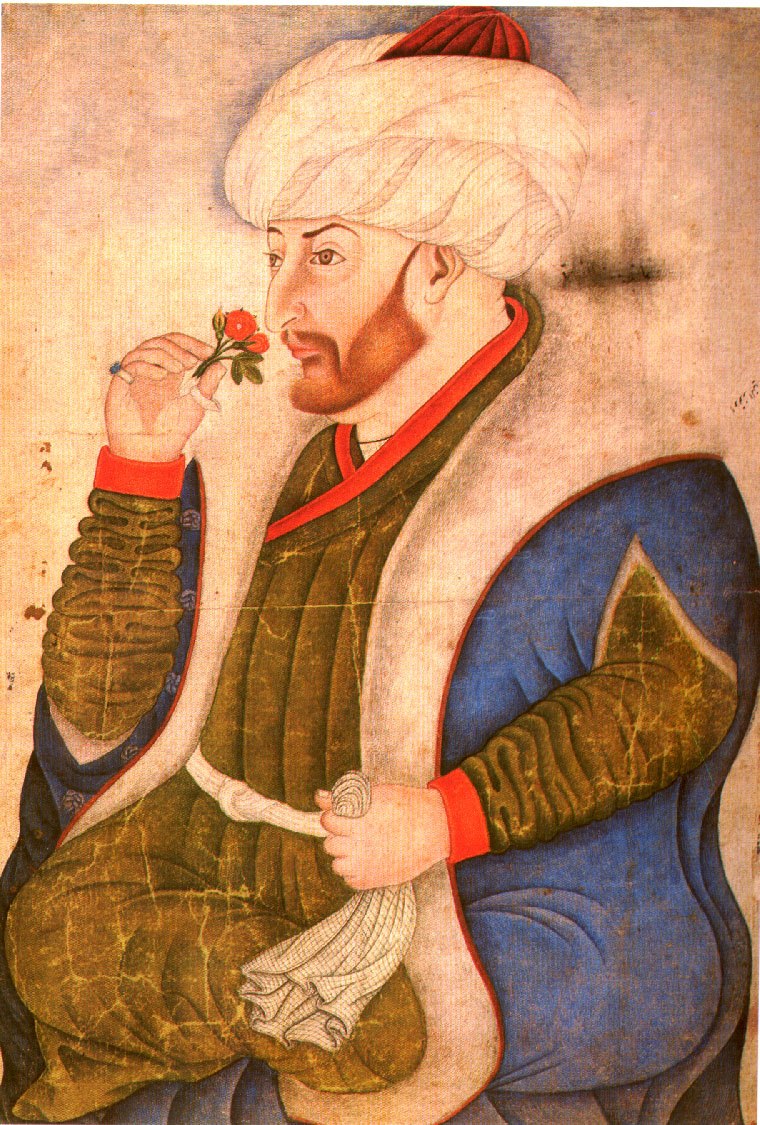
- Sultan Mehmed II smelling a rose, from the Sarayı Albums. Hazine 2153, folio 10a.
Date	First: 1444–1446, second: 1451–1481
Location	Europe and Near East
Result	Territorial expansion of the Ottoman Empire

This is a list of campaigns personally led by Mehmed II (30 March 1432 – 3 May 1481) (Ottoman Turkish: محمد ثانى, Meḥmed-i s̠ānī; Turkish: II. Mehmet; also known as el-Fātiḥ, الفاتح, "the Conqueror" in Ottoman Turkish; in modern Turkish, Fatih Sultan Mehmet; also called Mahomet II in early modern Europe) was Sultan of the Ottoman Empire twice, first for a short time from 1444 to September 1446, and later from February 1451 to 1481. At the age of 21, he conquered Constantinople and brought an end to the Byzantine Empire, transforming the Ottoman state into an empire. Mehmed continued his conquests in Asia, with the Anatolian reunification, and in Europe, as far as Bosnia and Croatia. Mehmed II is regarded as a national hero in Turkey, and Istanbul's Fatih Sultan Mehmet Bridge is named after him.

== List of campaigns ==
Campaigns in Europe
Campaigns in Anatolia

#	Campaign	Campaign dates	Notes
1	Karaman	1451	The Karamanids attacked Ottoman territory after Mehmed became sultan. In response Sultan Mehmed made his first campaign against Karaman. The Karamanids were defeated and İbrahim II of Karaman promised not to attack the Ottomans again and so peace was restored.
2	Constantinople	1453	While Sultan Mehmed was on his campaign against Karaman, the Byzantine emperor Constantine XI demanded an increase of the annual allowance to an Ottoman pretender in Constantinople. Mehmed refused and prepared to besiege Constantinople. He ordered the construction of the Rumeli Hisar after which the siege of the city began. The city was conquered following a siege lasting 53 days. The Byzantine Empire ceased to exist and the city became the new capital of the Ottoman Empire.
3	Despotate of Serbia	1454	Mehmed led a campaign against Serbia because the Serbian despot Đurađ Branković had refused to send tribute and made an alliance with the Hungary. Ottoman troops quickly succeeded in capturing Sivricehisar (sometimes identified with the Ostrvica Fortress) and Omolhisar, and in repulsing 9,000 cavalry sent against them by the despot. They then started a siege of the Serbian capital Smederevo. Upon learning of an approaching relief force under John Hunyadi, Mehmed lifted the siege and returned to Ottoman lands at the end of August, leaving a part of his force behind in Serbia in case of an offensive on Ottoman territory by Hunyadi. This force was defeated by a combined Hungarian-Serbian army led by Hunyadi and Nikola Skobaljić on the 2nd of October in Krusevac, although the Ottomans were able avenge this defeat a month later on the 16th of November when they defeated Skobaljić's army in Tripolje, capturing and impaling Skobaljić in the process.
4	Despotate of Serbia	1455	After receiving reports coming from the frontier about Serbian weakness against another invasion, Sultan Mehmed decided upon another campaign targeted at Serbia. The Ottoman army conquered the important mining city of Novo Brdo after a 40 day long siege, along with the city of Banice before returning home.
5	Kingdom of Hungary	1456	Mehmed desired to conquer the strategically important city of Belgrade, which was under the control of the Kingdom of Hungary. Significant preparations were made for the campaign by the Sultan, which included the casting of numerous cannons and the establishment of a Danubian navy to aid in the siege. Despite these measures, the campaign would result in failure when a relief force under the command of John Hunyadi would arrive to save Belgrade, defeating the Ottoman navy and repulsing the Ottoman general assault on the city. The actions of the Sultan and the arrival of reinforcements would narrowly prevent the Ottoman army from being completely routed. The Ottoman council of war would decide on ending the siege soon after, since the army had been significantly weakened and Mehmed himself had sustained injuries, as he at one point of the battle had personally joined the fighting. During the night, the Ottomans would bury their dead and evacuate their encampment, leaving behind significant loot. The Sultan and his army would retreat back to Bulgaria, without the Christian forces being able to pursue after them.
6	Despotate of Serbia	1458–59 (Note: Campaign initially led by Mahmud Pasha in 1458, Mehmed took over command and completed the conquest of Serbia in 1459)	After the death of the Serbian despot Đurađ Branković, a succession crisis broke out in Serbia. The Ottoman government wanted to exploit the situation to annex the despotate, dispatching the Grand Vizier Mahmud Pasha with an army to conquer the region in 1458, while the Sultan himself was engaged in a campaign in Morea. Mahmud Pasha initially conquered Resava and a number of other settlements before marching on Smederevo. After a battle outside the city walls, the defenders were forced to retreat inside the fortress. In the ensuing siege, the Ottoman forces successfully breached the outer walls, but failed to capture the inner citadel. Not wanting to waste time capturing the citadel, Mahmud Pasha lifted the siege and diverted his army elsewhere, conquering Rudnik and Golubac. Following this, the Grand Vizier went to Skopje to meet with Sultan Mehmed, who had completed his campaign in Morea. During this meeting, reports were received that a Hungarian army was assembling near the Danube to attack Ottoman positions in Serbia. Mahmud Pasha advised the Sultan to not go through with the annual disbandment of some frontier Ottoman forces that would happen following the end of the summer campaign season, which Mehmed acceded to as a measure against the Hungarian attack. This enabled the local Ottoman forces to successfully repulse the Hungarian invaders near Užice. After this victory, and the suppression of a revolt in Prizren by Mahmud Pasha, Mehmed personally took over command of the Serbian campaign, marching on Smederevo with his army. The city surrendered on June 20, 1459. In the ensuing months, Serbian castles which continued to resist were subdued by the Ottoman army, bringing the entirety of the Serbian kingdom under Ottoman control.
7	Morea	1458–59	The Despotate of Morea refused to pay its annual tribute and revolted. In response Mehmed led a campaign into Morea. The inhabitants were defeated and their territories were annexed into the Ottoman Empire.
8	Morea	1460	Mehmed led a campaign in the Morea, which ended with the annexation of the Despotate of Morea.
9	Amasra	1460	Amasra, the most important fortress of the Genoese on the Black Sea coast, was besieged and captured.
10	Sinop	1461	Mehmed led a campaign against Trebizond and on the way annexed the entire Black Sea coast to the Ottoman Empire ending the reign of the Jandarids peacefully.
11	Trebizond	1461	After the emperor of the Empire of Trebizond refused to pay tribute and made an alliance with the Akkoyunlu Mehmed led a campaign against Trebizond by land and sea. After a siege of more than 32 days, Trebizond and the emperor surrendered and the Empire came to an end.
12	Wallachia	1462	Vlad the Impaler who with Ottoman help had become the Ottoman vassal ruler of Wallachia, refused to pay tribute after some years and invaded Ottoman territory in northern Bulgaria. At that point, Mehmed, with the main Ottoman army, was on the Trebizond campaign in Asia. When Mehmed returned from his Trebizond campaign he invaded Wallachia. Vlad attacked Mehmed's camp near Târgoviște and failed to assassinate him. This would lead to Vlad fleeing from Wallachia and to the rise to the throne of his Ottoman-supported brother Radu as a vassal ruler.
13	Lesbos	1462	The island of Lesbos was captured following a siege of its capital, Mytilene, and annexed.
14	Bosnia	1463–64	Mehmed led a campaign against the Kingdom of Bosnia and annexed it to the Ottoman Empire
15	Albania	1466–67	Mehmed led a campaign against Albania and besieged Krujë, but the Albanians resisted successfully. Mehmed transferred the siege to Ballaban Pasha and returned to Constantinople.
16	Karaman	1468	After the death of the ruler of Karamanids a civil war began among his sons in which Uzun Hasan, ruler of the Akkoyunlu, also became involved. After some time Mehmed marched into the area and annexed the Karamanids to the Ottoman Empire.
17	Negroponte	1470	During the long Ottoman–Venetian War (1463–1479). Mehmed led a campaign against the Venetian colony of Negroponte and after a siege annexed the region to the Ottoman Empire
18	Eastern Anatolia	1473	After many years of hostility Mehmed invaded the lands of the Akkoyunlu and defeated their ruler, Uzun Hasan, in the Battle of Otlukbeli, after which they did not pose a threat against the Ottomans anymore.
19	Moldavia	1476	Stephen III of Moldavia attacked Wallachia, an Ottoman vassal, and refused to pay the annual tribute. An Ottoman army was defeated in the Battle of Vaslui and Mehmed led a personal campaign against Moldavia. He defeated the Moldavians in the Battle of Valea Albă, but was forced to retreat after a failed Siege of Neamț Citadel.
20	Serbia	1477	While the Ottoman army was crossing the Danube after the Moldavian campaign, news came from Mihaloğlu Ali Bey that the Hungarians had built two castles at the junction of the Danube and Sava rivers and on the right bank of the Danube. Sultan Mehmed considered it necessary to prevent this situation immediately. He came to Edirne during winter, something the Hungarians did not believe he would do. When the Ottoman army arrived at Smederevo, it repelled several attacks and the garrisons of the two Hungarian forts around the city fled. However, those in the third fortress stood firm and suffered 500 casualties as a result of the Ottoman attack. Mehmed besieged the fort, but he knew that he could not continue the siege for a long time due to the harsh winter conditions. He had his soldiers cut down trees and had these fill in the ditch up to the level of the walls. Respecting the promise of safe passage, the garrison agreed to surrender as Mehmed prepared to burn the timber he had piled up to set the castle on fire.
21	Albania	1478	During the long Ottoman–Venetian War (1463–1479) Mehmed invaded Albania and besieged the Venetian fortress of Shkodra. The war ended in Venetian defeat and Shkodra was surrendered to the Ottomans in accordance with the Treaty of Constantinople (1479).
22	Salento	1480–1481	In the summer of 1480, the Ottomans invaded southern Italy, and laid siege to Otranto, finally capturing it on 11 August. This was their first outpost in Italy.

== Mehmed's opponents ==
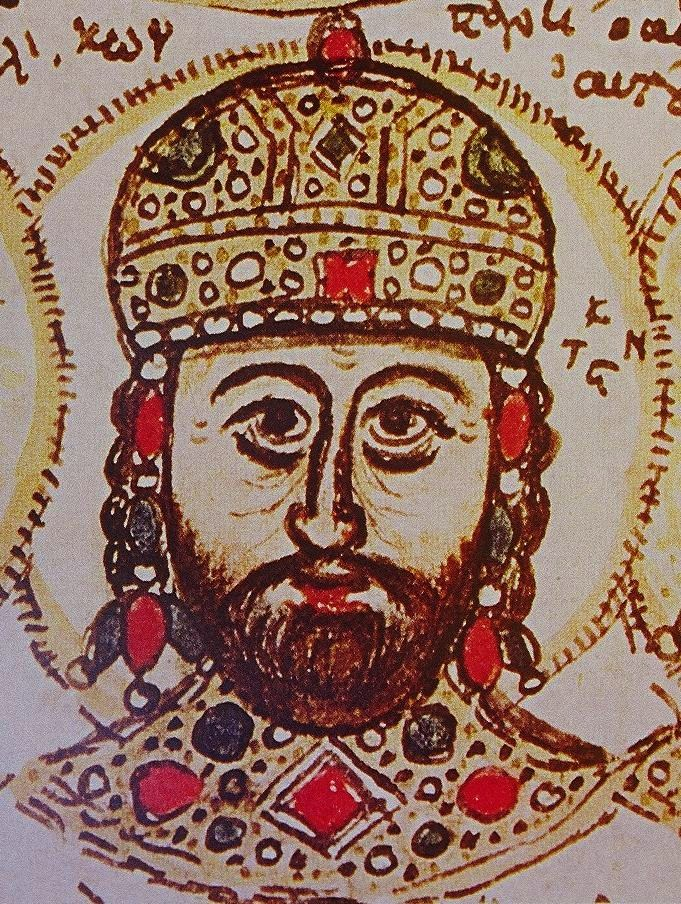
Constantine XI (Campaign 2)

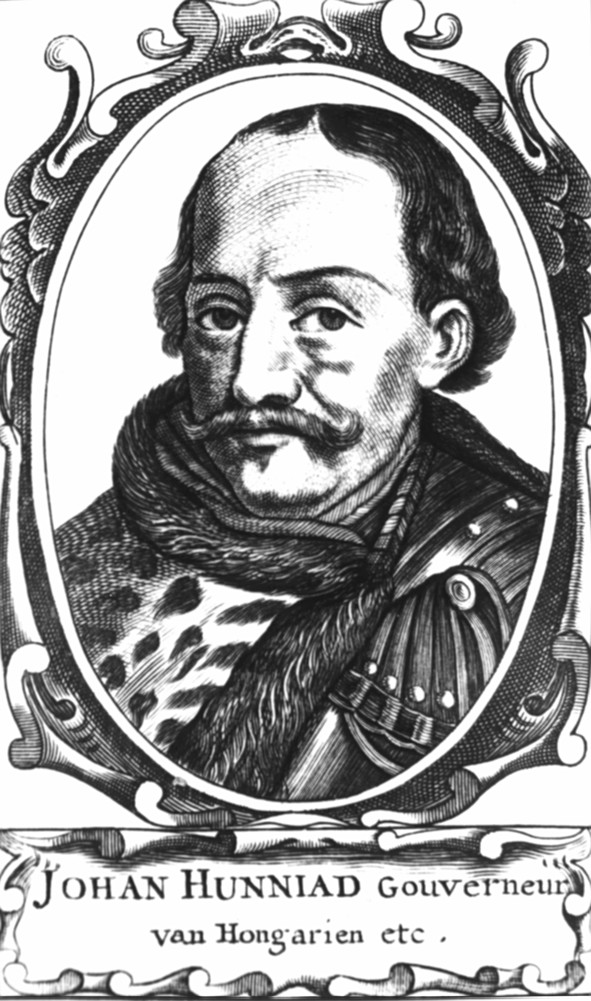
John Hunyadi (Campaign 3-5)

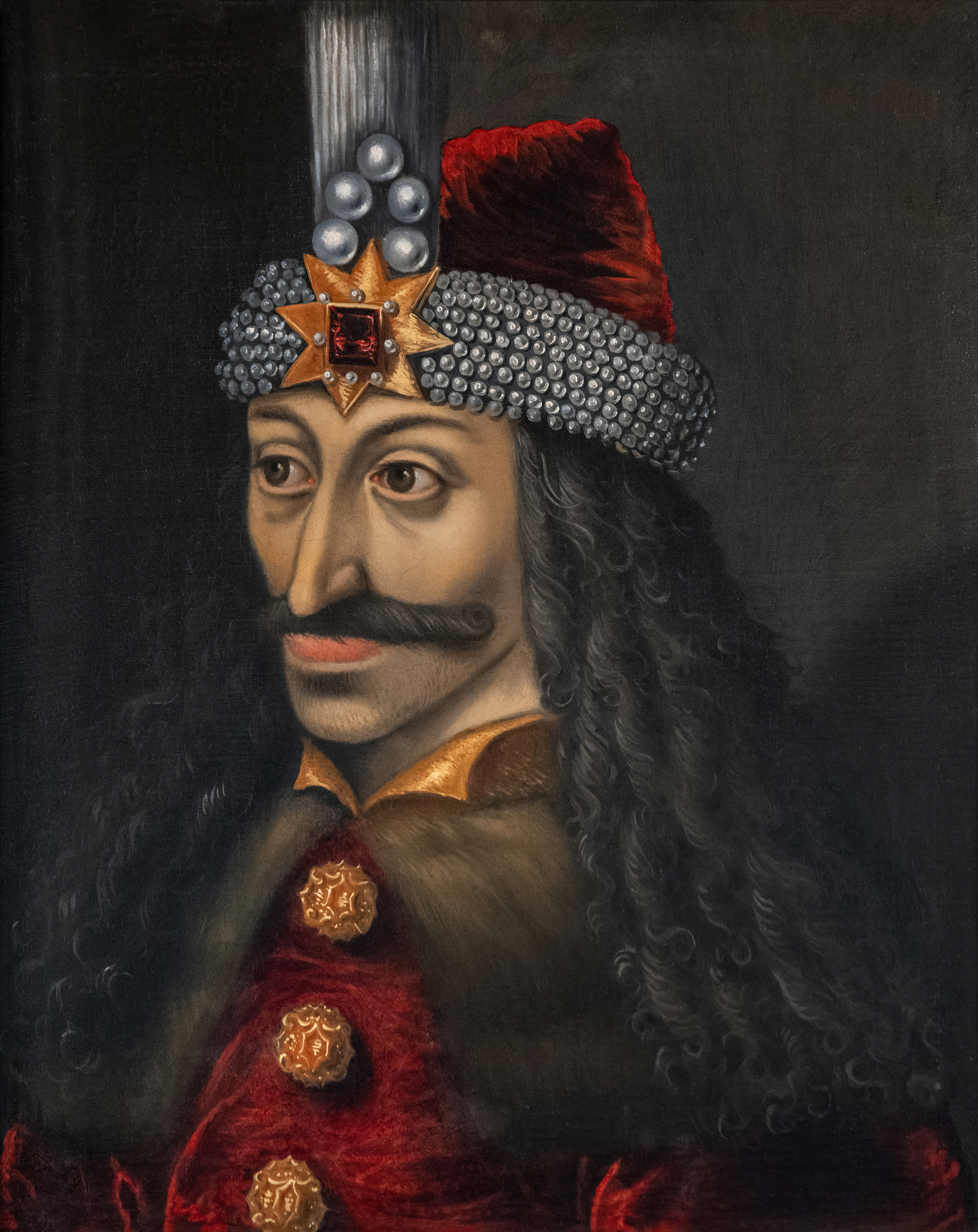
Vlad the Impaler (Campaign 12)

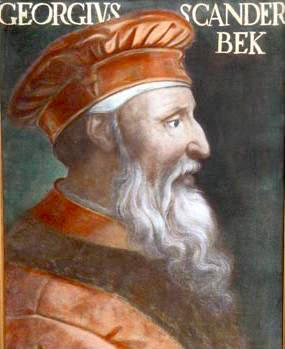
Skanderbeg (Campaign 15)

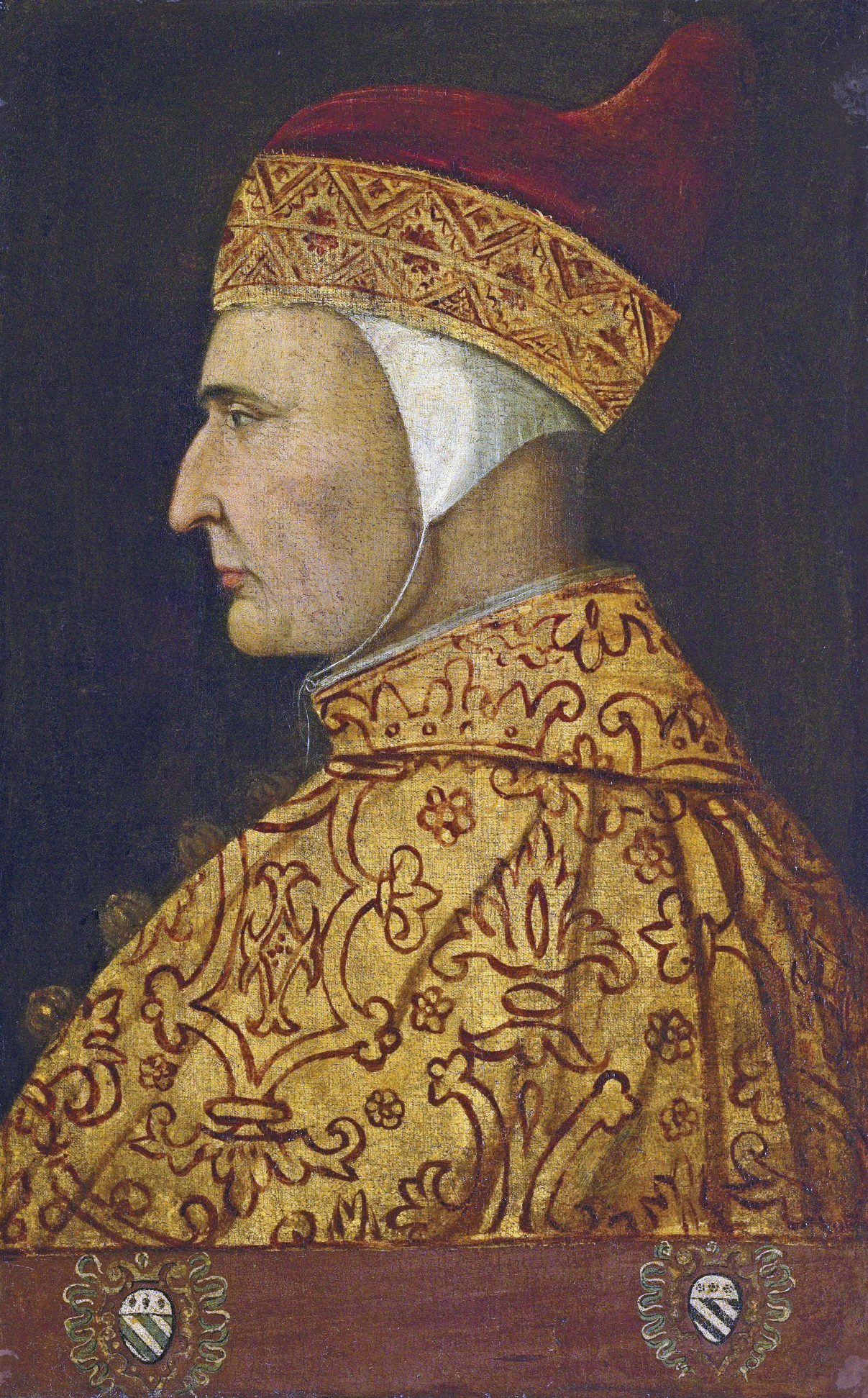
Cristoforo Moro (Campaign 17)

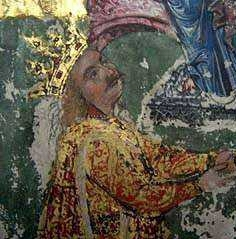
Stephen III of Moldavia (Campaign 19)

== See also ==
- Mehmed the Conqueror
- Growth of the Ottoman Empire
- Index of Ottoman Empire-related articles
- List of Ottoman sieges and landings
- Outline of the Ottoman Empire
