= Sürmeli Ali Pasha =

Grand Vizier of the Ottoman Empire from 1694 to 1695

Grand Vizier of the Ottoman Empire
- In office 13 March 1694 – 22 April 1695
- Monarchs: Ahmed II; Mustafa II
- Preceded by: Bozoklu Mustafa Pasha
- Succeeded by: Elmas Mehmed Pasha

Personal details
- Born: c. 1645 Didymoteicho, Ottoman Greece
- Died: 29 May 1695 (aged 49–50) Adrianople, Ottoman Empire

Military service
- Allegiance: Ottoman Empire
- Rank: Serdar (commander)
- Battles/wars: Great Turkish War

Sürmeli Ali Pasha (c. 1645, Didymoteicho – 29 May 1695, Adrianople) was an Ottoman statesman of Greek Muslim or Pomak origin who served as grand vizier of the Ottoman Empire from 1694 to 1695. His epithet sürmeli literally means "wearing mascara" in Turkish.

Sürmeli Ali Pasha, was born in Didymoteicho (today in East Macedonia and Thrace, northeastern Greece). If he was born in the town of Didymoteichon itself or a neighbouring lowland village, this fact supports a Greek origin, while if he was born in a higher altitude village of the eastern Rhodopi he is more likely to have been of Pomak origin. Surmeli Ali Pasha was a high-ranking bureaucrat, serving in the shipyards and in the treasury. He also served as the governor of Cyprus and Tripoli Eyalet (modern-day Tripoli, Lebanon).

On 13 March 1694, he was appointed as the grand vizier by sultan Ahmed II. He also took the title serdar, meaning the "commander of the army," and fought against Habsburg monarchy. He laid siege to Petrovaradin (in modern-day Serbia), but soon lifted it.

On 6 February 1695, Ahmed II died, and after some hesitation, the new sultan Mustafa II dismissed Sürmeli Ali Pasha on 22 April 1695. There were several reasons for this. Mustafa suspected that Sürmeli Ali Pasha's candidate for the throne instead of him had been a younger prince and he further suspected that Sürmeli Ali Pasha was against his plan for commanding the army personally. Additionally, there was a power struggle between Sürmeli Ali Pasha and Feyzullah Efendi, the sultan's advisor (and later Shaykh al-Islām). Sürmeli Ali was accused of fraud and exiled to Çeşme (in modern-day İzmir Province, Turkey), but soon the sultan changed his mind and had Sürmeli Ali executed on 29 May 1695.

== See also ==
- List of Ottoman grand viziers

Political offices
Preceded by Bozoklu Mustafa Pasha	Grand Vizier of the Ottoman Empire; 13 March 1694 – 22 April 1695	Succeeded by Elmas Mehmed Pasha
