= Bozoklu Mustafa Pasha =

Grand Vizier of the Ottoman Empire from 1693 to 1694

Grand Vizier of the Ottoman Empire
- In office 27 March 1693 – 13 March 1694
- Monarch: Ahmed II
- Preceded by: Çalık Ali Pasha
- Succeeded by: Sürmeli Ali Pasha

Personal details
- Born: 1638 Yozgat, Ottoman Empire
- Died: December 1698 (aged 59–60) Edirne, Ottoman Empire

Military service
- Allegiance: Ottoman Empire
- Branch/service: Ottoman Army; Ottoman Navy
- Rank: Kapudan Pasha (1680–84); Commander (1684–90)
- Battles/wars: Great Turkish War

Bozoklu Mustafa Pasha (1638 – December 1698) was an Ottoman statesman who served as grand vizier from 1693 to 1694. His epithet Bozoklu means "from Bozok" (modern Yozgat, Turkey).

== Early life ==
Mustafa was a bureaucrat in the Ottoman Empire. He was appointed as the Kapudan Pasha (grand admiral) and then as the commander of the Polish front during the Great Turkish War. In collaboration with the Crimean khan Selim I Giray, he was able to defend Kamianets-Podilskyi, an important fort (now in Ukraine) from Polish attacks. In 1690, he was appointed as the governor of Damascus (now in Syria) and Tripoli (now in Lebanon). On 27 March 1693, he succeeded Çalık Ali Pasha as the grand vizier. He was of Turkish origin.

== As a grand vizier ==
Transylvania (a region corresponding to modern-day western Romania; Turkish: Erdel) was then under Austrian occupation, and in the summer of 1693, Mustafa Pasha campaigned to take it for the Ottomans. However, the Austrians besieged Belgrad (now in Serbia) south of his campaign course and Mustafa Pasha changed his course to defend Belgrad. Austrians had to lift the siege. Mustafa Pasha repaired the fort and returned to Istanbul, the capital. However, being close to the front, Austrians were ready to renew their attacks. Mustafa Pasha, however, was quite unconcerned for the coming Austrian attacks. He was more concerned with hunting than preparing for the next campaign. Sultan Ahmed II dismissed him on 13 March 1694 after a year in the office.

== Death ==
Mustafa Pasha's next post was his former post, the governorship of Tripoli. In May 1698, he was called to Istanbul to be the acting grand vizier during the then-grand vizier's presence at the battle front. Shortly thereafter, however, Mustafa Pasha died in December 1698.

== See also ==
- List of Ottoman grand viziers

Political offices
Preceded by Çalık Ali Pasha	Grand Vizier of the Ottoman Empire; 27 March 1693 – 13 March 1694	Succeeded by Sürmeli Ali Pasha
