= Arabacı Ali Pasha =

Grand Vizier of the Ottoman Empire from 1691 to 1692

Arabacı · Bahadırzade · Kadı Ali Pasha

Grand Vizier of the Ottoman Empire
- In office 24 August 1691 – 21 March 1692
- Monarch: Ahmed II
- Preceded by: Köprülü Fazıl Mustafa Pasha
- Succeeded by: Çalık Ali Pasha

Personal details
- Born: c. 1620 Ohrid, Ottoman Empire (modern North Macedonia)
- Died: 1693 (aged 72-73) Rhodes (modern Greece)
- Origins: Albanian

Arabacı Ali Pasha (also known as Bahadırzade Ali Pasha; 1620–1693) was a short-term Albanian Ottoman grand vizier from 1691 to 1692. His epithet arabacı means "charioteer" in Turkish, an allusion to his practice of sending his political enemies to death or exile in a certain tumbrel.

== Early years ==
He was born in Ohrid (in modern North Macedonia) of Albanian ethnicity. After serving in various government offices, he became a subordinate of Köprülü Fazıl Mustafa Pasha, who was appointed as a grand vizier. The empire was engaged in Great Turkish War. Fazıl Mustafa Pasha temporarily halted Austrian advance but was killed in action during the Battle of Slankamen. Five days later, Ahmet II, the sultan appointed Ali Pasha as the new grand vizier.

== As grand vizier ==
Ali Pasha was expected to command the army like his predecessor and mentor Köprülü Fazıl Mustafa Pasha had done. However, Ali Pasha preferred to stay in the capital, contributing to the Ottoman defeats. His inattentiveness to military affairs and harsh methods (including death sentences) towards his potential opponents caused him to lose the support of the sultan. On 21 March 1692, he was deposed.

== Final days and death ==
Ali Pasha was first exiled to Gelibolu (a port on the Dardanelles strait, in modern Turkey) and then to the island of Rhodes (in modern Greece). However, when a rumor reached the sultan in Istanbul that he had plans return (or revolt), he was executed in Rhodes in 1693.

== See also ==
- List of Ottoman grand viziers

Political offices
Preceded by Köprülü Fazıl Mustafa Pasha	Grand Vizier of the Ottoman Empire; 24 August 1691 – 21 March 1692	Succeeded by Çalık Ali Pasha
