= Polish Jagiellon ambassadors to the Ottoman Empire =

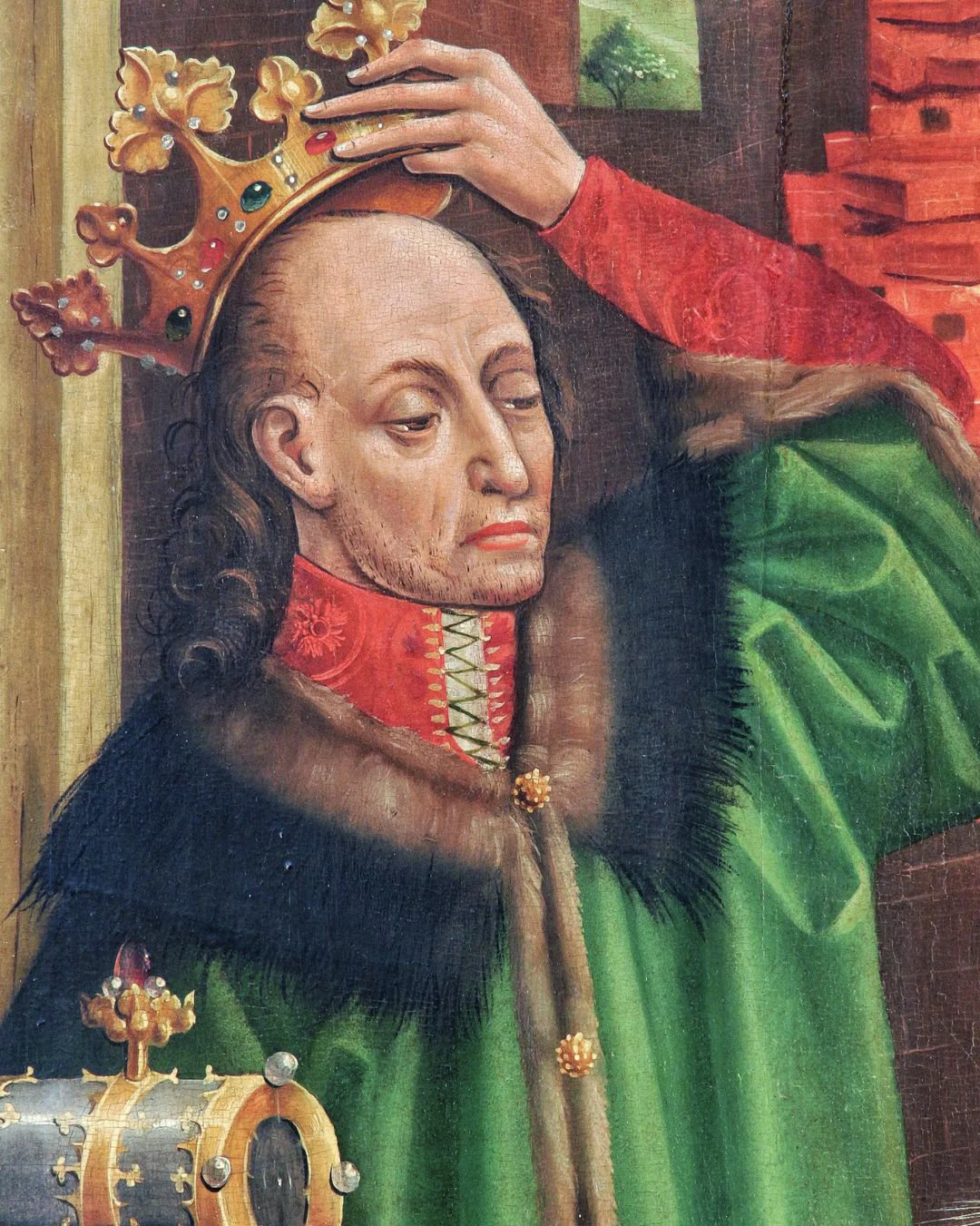
Jogaila, also called Władysław II

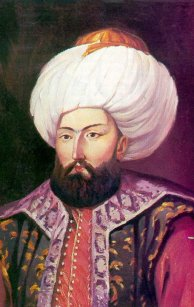
Mehmet I, also called Mehmet Çelebi

Below is the list of Jagiellon Poland ambassadors to Ottoman Empire in the 15th and 16th centuries. The diplomatic relations began in 1414 soon after the Ottoman Interregnum during the reign of first Jagiellon king of Polond-Lithuania. The names of the monarchs in 1414 were Jogaila and Mehmet I.

Year	Name of the diplomat	Polish king	Ottoman sultan
1414	Skarbek-Gregor	Jogaila	Mehmet I
1440	Dobrogost-Luksz	Wladyslaw III	Murat II
1475	Marcin Wrocimowski	Casimir	Mehmet II
1489	Mikolaj Firlej	Casimir	Beyazıt II
1500	Wawrzyniec Fedro-Jan Buczacki	John I	Beyazıt II
1509	Jedrzej Zakrzewski	Sigismund I	Beyazıt II
1510	Andrzej Zakrzewski	Sigismund I	Beyazıt II
1512	Janusz Swierczewski	Sigismund I	Selim I
1524	Jan z Tęczyna	Sigismund I	Süleyman I
1531	Jakub Wiamowski	Sigismund I	Süleyman I
1532	Piotr Opaliński	Sigismund I	Süleyman I
1535	Jan Ocieski	Sigismund I	Süleyman I
1550 ?	Stanisław Tęczyński	Sigismund II	Süleyman I
1564	Jerzy Jarlowiecki	Sigismund II	Süleyman I
1567	Piotr Zborowski	Sigismund II	Selim II
1569	Andrzej Tarnovski	Sigismund II	Selim II
