= Truce of Adrianople =

1547 treaty between the Holy Roman Empire and the Ottoman Empire

Truce of Adrianople
1547
The 1547 Truce of Adrianople was made between the Holy Roman Empire and the Ottoman Empire.

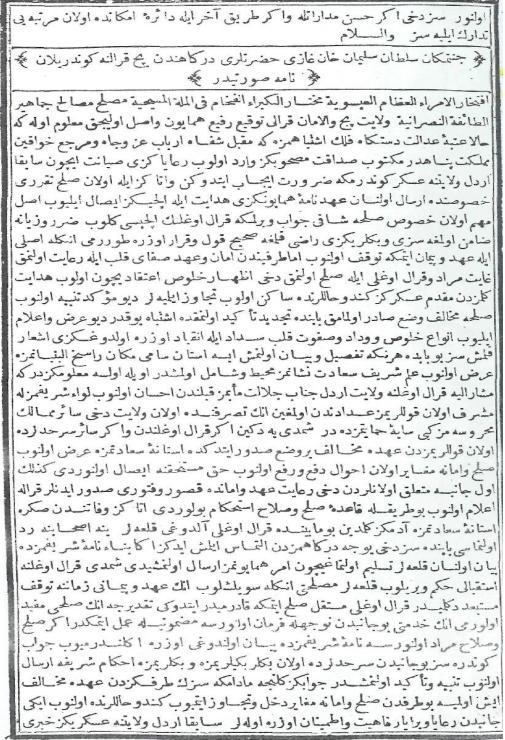
Text of the Truce

The Truce of Adrianople in 1547, named after the Ottoman city of Adrianople (present-day Edirne), was signed between Ferdinand I of Austria and Suleiman the Magnificent. Through this treaty, Ferdinand I of Austria recognized Ottoman control of Hungary, and agreed to pay to the Ottomans a yearly tribute of 30,000 gold florins for his possessions in northern and western Hungary. The Treaty followed important Ottoman victories in Hungary, such as the siege of Esztergom (1543).

When Louis II of Hungary fell at Mohacs fighting the Turks in 1526, his crown was thrown to the Habsburgs. The agreement bought the Catholic Habsburgs peace on their eastern frontier so they could answer the German Protestant Princes in the west, which coalesced to the Thirty Years War, 1618-1648. The truce was the result of a triangular affair with John Sigismund Zápolya, Voivode of Transylvania. It wasn't until the truce expired in 1551 that Ferdinand I asserted as legitimate his claim to all of Hungary.
