= Siege of Esztergom (1543) =

1543 Successful Ottoman siege of Esztergom

- Part of the Habsburg–Ottoman war of 1540–1547
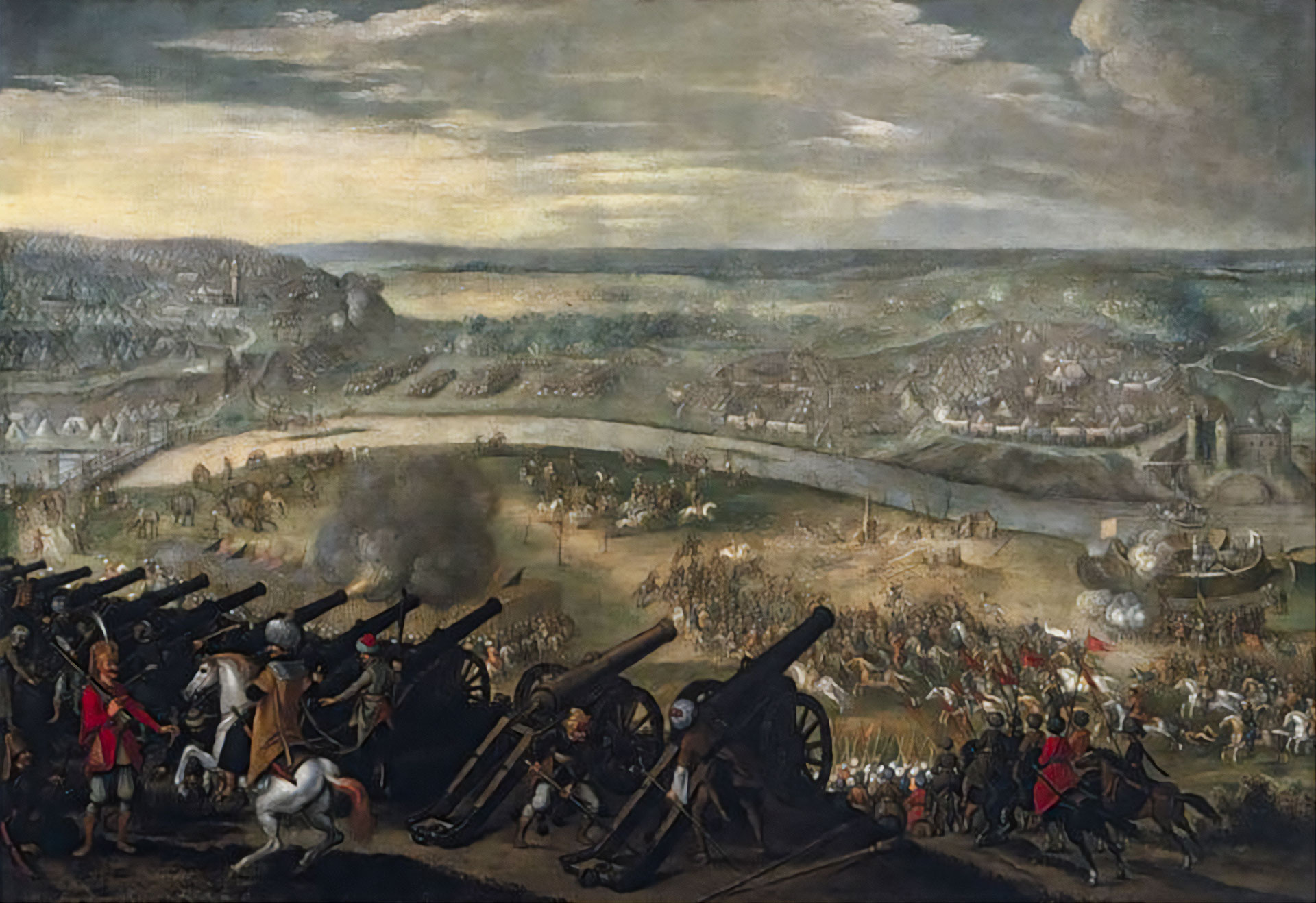
- Siege of Esztergom in 1543, by Sebastian Vrancks.
Date	25 July – 10 August 1543
Location	Esztergom, Hungary
Result	Ottoman victory

Belligerents
Holy Roman Empire	Ottoman Empire; Supported by: Kingdom of France

Commanders and leaders
Francisco Salamanca	Suleiman the Magnificent; Şehzade Mehmed; Hadim Suleiman Pasha

Strength
	Artillery unit

The siege of Esztergom occurred between 25 July and 10 August 1543, when the Ottoman army, led by Sultan Suleiman the Magnificent, besieged the city of Esztergom in modern Hungary. The city was captured by the Ottomans after two weeks.

== Background ==
The siege was part of a struggle between the Habsburgs and the Ottomans following the death of the ruler of Hungary, John Zápolya, on 20 July 1540. This is part of the "Age of castle wars" in Hungarian history. Suleiman had captured the cities of Buda and Pest in 1541, giving him a powerful control over central Hungary. The Province (Beylerbeylik) of Buda was created in this occasion.

As part of the Franco-Ottoman alliance, French troops were supplied to this Ottoman campaign in Hungary: a French artillery unit was dispatched in 1543-1544 and attached to the Ottoman Army. Meanwhile, in the Mediterranean Sea, Suleiman had sent his fleet admiral Hayreddin Barbarossa to cooperate with the French, leading to the siege of Nice.

== Siege ==
The Siege of Esztergom followed the failed attempt by Ferdinand I of Austria to recapture Buda in 1542. It would be followed in turn by the capture of the Hungarian coronation city of Székesfehérvár in September 1543. Other cities that were captured during this campaign are Siklós and Szeged in order to better protect Buda. However, Suleiman refrained from moving further on to Vienna this time, apparently because he had no news of the campaigns of his French allies in western Europe and in the Mediterranean.

After the successful Ottoman campaign, a first truce of one year was signed with Charles V in 1545, through the intermediary of Francis I of France. Suleiman himself was interested in ending the hostilities, as he had a campaign going on in Persia as well, the Ottoman–Safavid War (1532–1555). Two years later, Ferdinand and Charles V recognized total Ottoman control of Hungary in the 1547 Treaty of Adrianople, and Ferdinand even agreed to pay a yearly tribute of 30,000 gold florins for their Habsburg possessions in northern and western Hungary.

Following these conquests, central Hungary was to remain under Ottoman control until 1686.

== Gallery ==
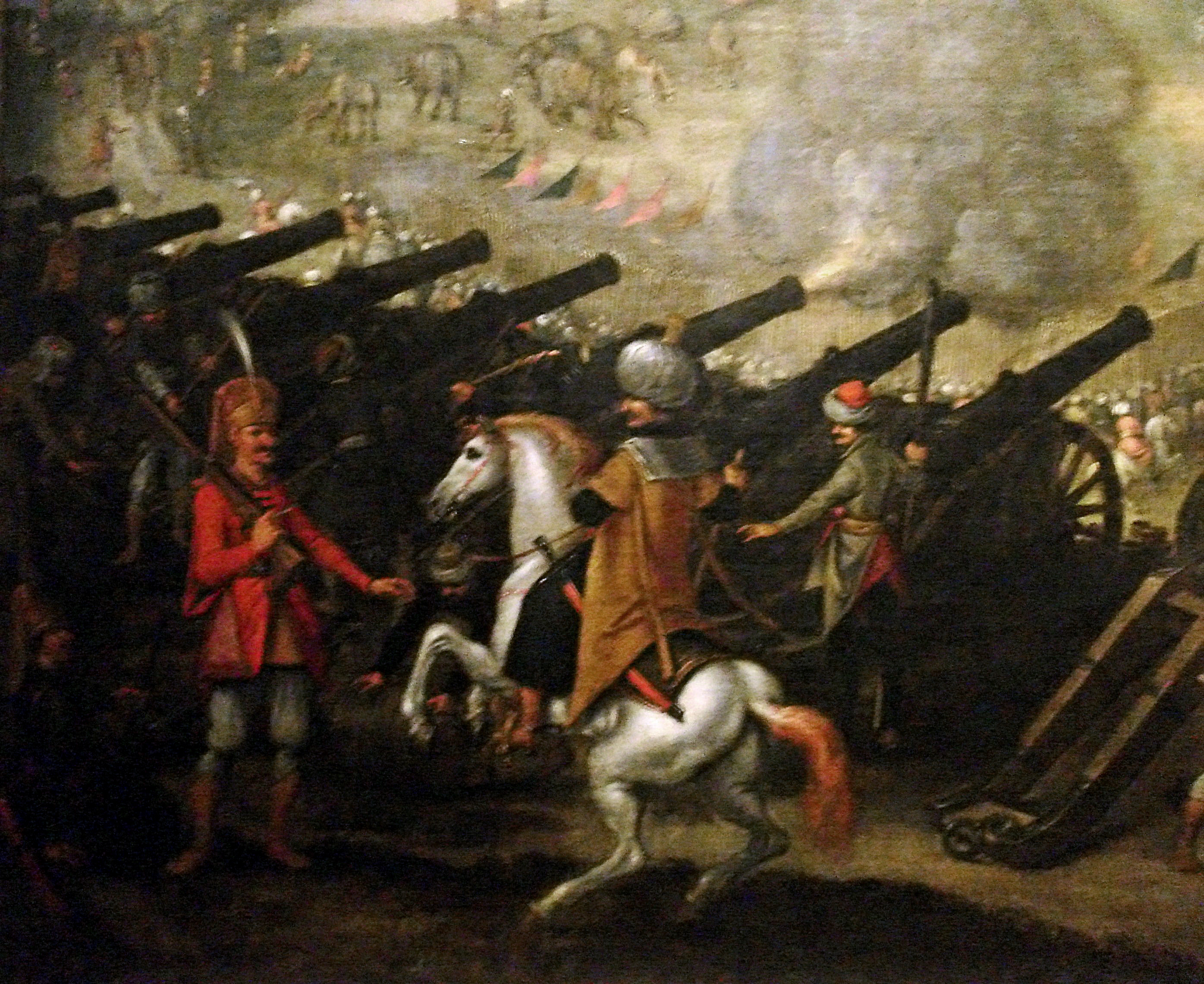
Cannon battery at the siege of Esztergom 1543 (detail).

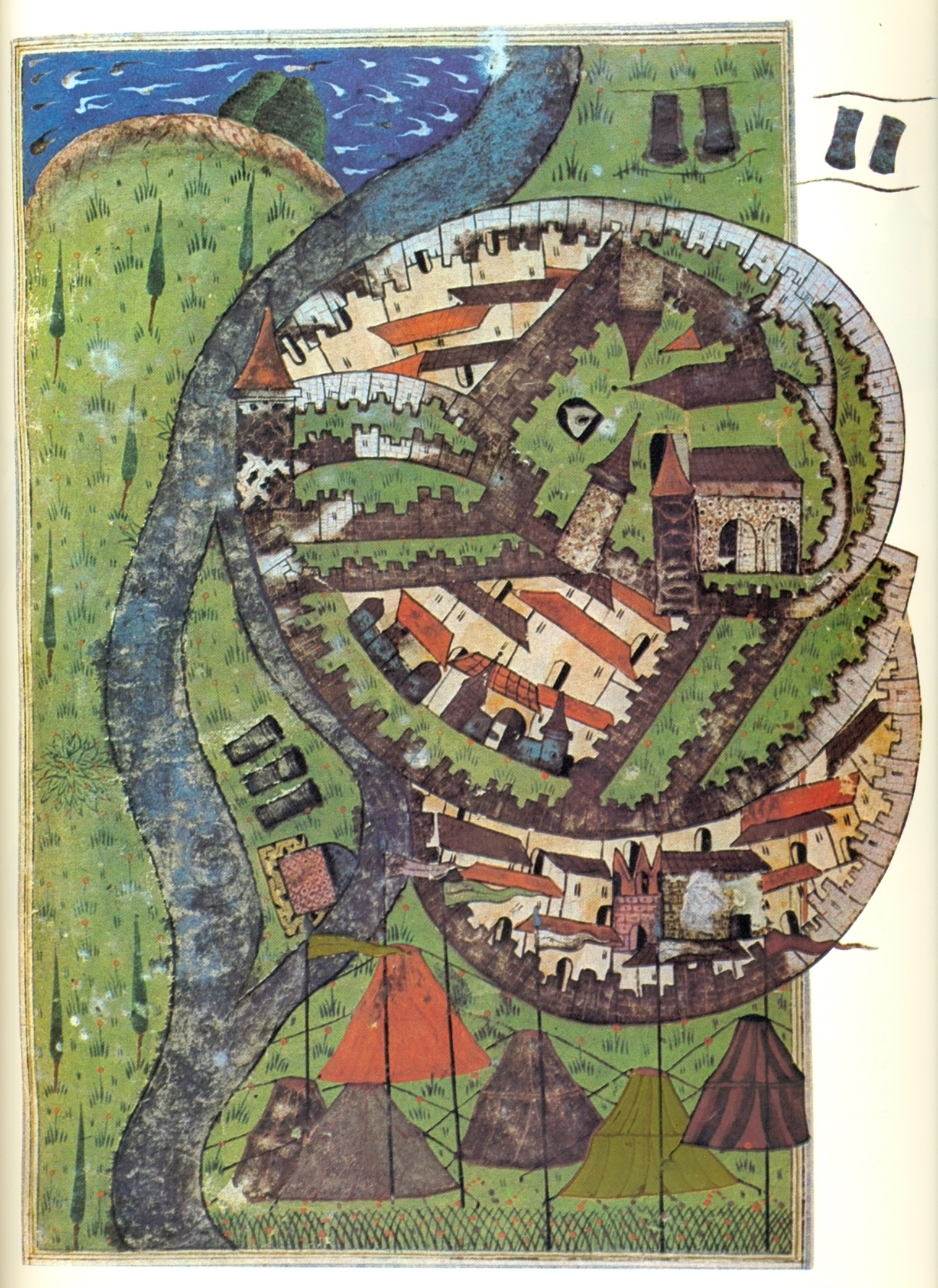
Esztergom in 1543 on a Turkish miniature

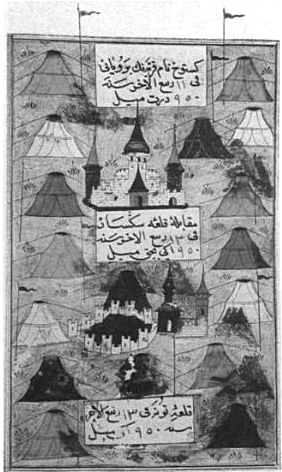
Stages and distances to the fortress of Esztergom (Ottoman print).

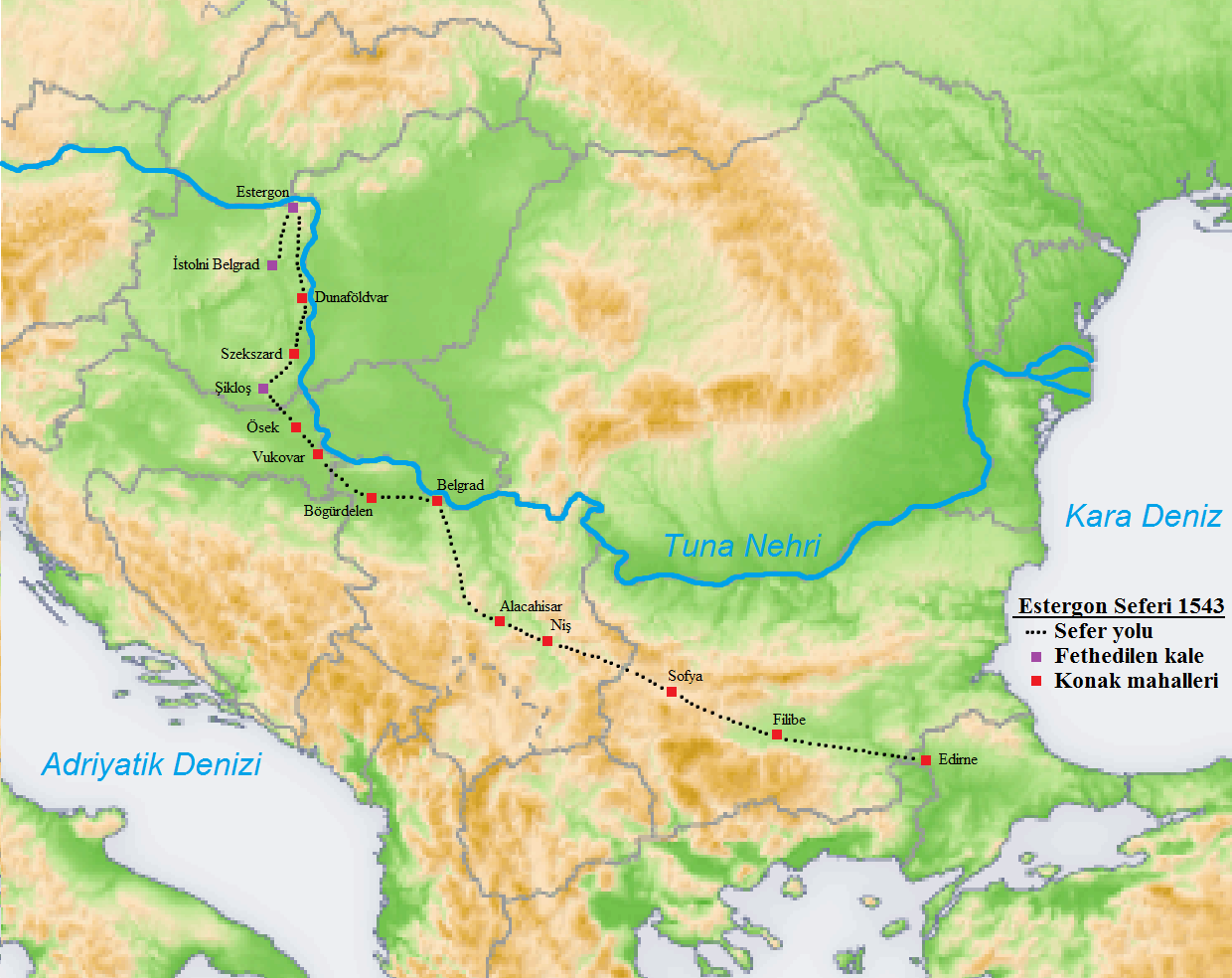
The campaign route of the Ottoman army.

== See also ==
- Little War in Hungary
- Ottoman wars in Europe
- Battle of Párkány
