= Çalık Ali Pasha =

Grand Vizier of the Ottoman Empire from 1692 to 1693

Hacı · Çalık · Merzifonlu Ali Pasha

Grand Vizier of the Ottoman Empire
- In office 23 March 1692 – 17 March 1693
- Monarch: Ahmed II
- Preceded by: Arabacı Ali Pasha
- Succeeded by: Bozoklu Mustafa Pasha

Personal details
- Born: Merzifon, Ottoman Empire
- Died: 11 October 1698 Heraklion, Ottoman Crete
- Origins: Turkish

Çalık Ali Pasha (also Hacı Çalık Ali Pasha or Merzifonlu Çalık Ali Pasha; died in 1698) was an Ottoman statesman who served as grand vizier during the reign of Ahmed II.

== Early life ==
Ali Pasha was a Turk from Merzifon, a city in north-central Anatolia, and a subordinate of Merzifonlu Kara Mustafa Pasha, who was also from Merzifon. Although his fellow countryman was executed after the unsuccessful siege of Vienna in 1683, Ali continued to work as a civil servant. He traveled to Mecca (now in Saudi Arabia) for pilgrimage and gained the title Hacı, and in 1688, he was appointed as governor of the Sanjak of Sakız Island (modern-day Chios, Greece). In 1690, he was appointed as the governor of Erzurum Eyalet and then as the governor of Diyarbekir Eyalet (both in modern-day Turkey).

== As Grand Vizier ==
On the 23rd of March 1692, Ali Pasha was appointed the Grand Vizier of the Ottoman Empire. His first action as grand vizier was to travel to the battlefield to observe the course of the ongoing war, the Great Turkish War. He made arrangements to repair the rampart of Belgrade (in modern-day Serbia). Upon returning to Istanbul, the capital, he concentrated on improve the state of the treasury, which was running a deficit due to the costly war. He authorized Canibi Ahmet, the defterdar (finance minister), for this task. However, although the treasury was recovered, Ali Pasha soon became the target of severe criticisms and opposition by political rivals because of his policy of economic austerity. The sultan asked him to dismiss Canibi Ahmet, but Çalık Ali Pasha tried to defend Ahmet Canibi. Failing to convince the sultan, he resigned on the 17th of March, 1693 after a year in the office.

== Later years ==
In the absolute monarchical system of the Ottoman Empire, objection to the sultan's order was unheard of. However, Ahmed II being one of the more tolerant sultans, did not punish Çalık Ali Pasha. Instead, he offered Ali Pasha a governorship. Ali Pasha spent the rest of his life in Bursa (in modern-day Turkey) and in Candia (modern-day Heraklion, on the island of Crete), where he died in 1698.

== See also ==
- List of Ottoman grand viziers

Political offices
Preceded by Arabacı Ali Pasha	Grand Vizier of the Ottoman Empire; 23 March 1692 – 17 March 1693	Succeeded by Bozoklu Mustafa Pasha
