= Köprülü =

Köprülü may refer to:

== People ==
- Köprülü family (Kypriljotet), an Ottoman noble family of Albanian origin
  - Köprülü era (1656–1703), the period in which the Ottoman Empire's politics were set by the Grand Viziers, mainly the Köprülü family
    - Köprülü Mehmed Pasha (1575–1661), Ottoman statesman, founder of the Köprülü family
    - Köprülü Fazıl Ahmed Pasha (1635–1676), Ottoman statesman
    - Köprülü Fazıl Mustafa Pasha (1637–1691), Ottoman statesman
    - Amcazade Köprülü Hüseyin Pasha (1644–1702), Ottoman statesman
    - Köprülü Numan Pasha (died 1719), Ottoman statesman
    - Köprülü Abdullah Pasha (died 1735), Ottoman general
  - Mehmet Fuat Köprülü (1890–1966), Turkish politician and historian
- Murat Köprülü, American chief executive

== Places ==
- Veles, North Macedonia, known as Köprülü until the Balkan Wars
- Köprülü, Göle, a town in the district of Göle, Ardahan Province of Turkey
- Köprülü, Ceyhan, a village in the district of Ceyhan, Adana Province, Turkey
- Köprülü, Gündoğmuş, a village in the district of Gündoğmuş, Antalya Province, Turkey
- Köprülü, Şavşat, a village in the district of Şavşat, Artvin Province, Turkey
- Köprülü Canyon, a canyon and a national park in Antalya Province, Turkey

== Other ==
- Koprulu Sector, a fictional sector in space in the StarCraft universe
