= Bekri Mustafa Pasha =

Grand Vizier of the Ottoman Empire from 1688 to 1689

Tekirdağlı Bekri Bekri Mustafa Pasha

Grand Vizier of the Ottoman Empire
- In office 30 May 1688 – 7 November 1689
- Monarch: Süleyman II
- Preceded by: Ayaşlı Ismail Pasha
- Succeeded by: Köprülü Fazıl Mustafa Pasha

Personal details
- Born: Tekirdağ, Ottoman Empire
- Died: January 1690 Malkara, Tekirdağ, Ottoman Empire

Bekri Mustafa Pasha ("Mustafa Pasha the Drunkard"; known by the epithet Tekirdağlı, meaning "from Tekirdağ"; died January 1690) was an Ottoman grand vizier during the Great Turkish War.

He was a member of the Janissary corps of the Ottoman army. In 1679, he was promoted to be the commander of the Janissaries (Agha of the Janissaries). Two years later, he was given the title of vizier. Beginning in 1683, the Ottoman Empire entered a long and disastrous war called the Great Turkish War. After the execution of Kara Mustafa Pasha in 1683 because of his failure, other pashas were appointed to that post in rapid sequence.

Bekri Mustafa was the fourth grandvizier after Mustafa Pasha. He succeeded Ayaşlı Ismail Pasha on 30 May 1688 during the reign of Süleyman II (reigned 1687–91). The first problem he had to solve was a rebellion, which was aimed to reenthrone the former sultan Mehmet IV (1648–1687). With the support of the Janissaries, he defeated the rebels. According to historian Nicolae Iorga, 6,000 people died during the clashes between the grand vizier's army and the rebels.

However, Bekri Mustafa Pasha was not successful against the advancing army of the Holy Roman Empire, and he was heavily criticized for being inattentive to state affairs. Although Süleyman II initially supported his grand vizier after a series of defeats in the fall of 1689, he was dismissed on 7 November 1689 and was exiled to Malkara (near Tekirdağ). He died there in January 1690.

== See also ==
- List of Ottoman grand viziers

Political offices
Preceded by Ayaşlı Ismail Pasha	Grand Vizier of the Ottoman Empire; 30 May 1688 – 7 November 1689	Succeeded by Köprülü Fazıl Mustafa Pasha
