= Köprü =

Köprü is the Turkish word for "bridge." It may refer to:

- Bridges in Turkey
- An Ottoman-era name for the city of Veles, today in the Republic of North Macedonia
- Vezirköprü, a district in Turkey
- Uzunköprü, a district and town in Turkey
- Köprü Dam, a dam in Turkey
- Köprüçay River, a river in Turkey

== See also ==
- Köprülü (disambiguation)
- Köprülü family
