= Sarı Süleyman Pasha =

Grand Vizier of the Ottoman Empire from 1685 to 1687

Grand Vizier of the Ottoman Empire
- In office 18 November 1685 – 18 September 1687
- Monarch: Mehmed IV
- Preceded by: Bayburtlu Kara Ibrahim Pasha
- Succeeded by: Abaza Siyavuş Pasha

Personal details
- Born: 1627 Taşlıca, Bosnia Eyalet, Ottoman Empire
- Died: 14 October 1687 (aged 59–60) Constantinople, Ottoman Empire

Military service
- Allegiance: Ottoman Empire
- Branch/service: Ottoman Army
- Rank: Commander-in-Chief
- Battles/wars: Great Turkish War: Battle of Buda (1686); Battle of Mohács (1687)

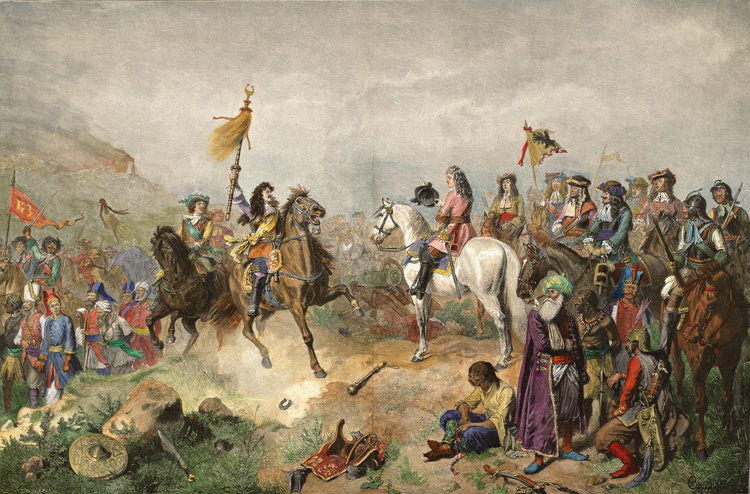
The Ottoman Army after suffering a devastating defeat during the Second Battle of Mohács.

Sarı Süleyman Pasha (Turkish: Sarı Süleyman Paşa; Serbo-Croatian: Sari Sulejman-paša; died 14 October 1687) was the grand vizier of the Ottoman Empire from 18 November 1685 to 18 September 1687. He was executed after the defeat of the Ottoman forces in the Second Battle of Mohács.

In Turkish, his epithet sarı means "blond (haired)", literally "yellow".

== Early life ==
He was of Bosnian descent. Sarı Süleyman Pasha was born in Taşlıca (Pljevlja, now Montenegro), in the Bosnia Eyalet.

He was the kdhya of Grand Vizier Ahmed Köprülü (s. 1661–1676), and later the Sultan's master of the horse.

== Grand Vizier of the Ottoman Empire ==
After Sarı Süleyman Pasha was appointed grand vizier, he immediately began to write desperate letters to the Great Khan of the Crimean Khanate and the pashas of Timișoara, Székesfehérvár and Osijek in order to reorganize and reinforce the battered Ottoman Army in Hungary, struggling during the Battle of Buda (1686). Although Sarı Süleyman Pasha made several attempts to break the blockade around Buda, the city was ultimately captured by Charles V, Duke of Lorraine. Soon afterwards the Ottomans had even lost Székesfehérvár.

Süleyman Pasha thereafter commanded his forces to hold what remained of the Ottoman north against their opponents and even sent Mehmet Agha to negotiate peace with Donat John Heissler at Guttentag.

After the defeat at Mohács, the Ottoman army started a rebellion against the grand vizier. Suleyman Pasha, fearful that the rebellion would result in his death, escaped from the commanding position, first to Belgrade and then, rather foolishly, to Constantinople, where he took refuge at the house of an old friend, a Jew named Salomon. At the beginning of September 1687, news about his defeat and escape came to Constantinople. After Mehmed IV received this news, he proclaimed Abaza Siyavuş Pasha as the new commander of the armed forces, and, eventually, as the new grand vizier. Soon after this, Süleyman Pasha was apprehended and executed. Two months later, the sultan himself was also removed from power as the result of the defeat in the Battle of Mohács, and was replaced by sultan Süleyman II.

== See also ==
- List of Ottoman grand viziers
- Battle of Mohács (1687)

Political offices
Preceded by Bayburtlu Kara Ibrahim Pasha	Grand Vizier of the Ottoman Empire; 18 November 1685 – 18 September 1687	Succeeded by Abaza Siyavuş Pasha
