= Ayaşlı Ismail Pasha =

Grand Vizier of the Ottoman Empire (1688)

Nişancı Ayaşlı İsmail Kemalettin Pasha

Grand Vizier of the Ottoman Empire
- In office 2 March 1688 – 2 May 1688
- Monarch: Süleyman II
- Preceded by: Abaza Siyavuş Pasha
- Succeeded by: Bekri Mustafa Pasha

Personal details
- Born: İsmail Kemalettin; 1620 Ayaş, Ottoman Empire (now in Turkey)
- Died: 18 April 1690 (aged 69–70) Rhodes, Ottoman Empire (now in Greece)

Ayaşlı İsmail Pasha (also known as Nişancı İsmail Kemalettin Pasha; 1620 – April 1690) was a short-term Ottoman grand vizier in 1688.

== Early years ==
He was of Turkish origin. He was born in Ayaş (in modern Ankara Province, Turkey) in 1620. After working as a bureaucrat in various posts, he retired from being the Ottoman governor of Rumelia Eyalet (eastern Thrace). However, he returned to government service in 1678 as a nişancı. He was described as mild-mannered, an anachronistic quality in that era of the Ottoman Empire.

== As a grand vizier ==
The Ottoman Empire was engaged in a long and costly war against Holy Alliance countries in the so-called Great Turkish War. After a series of military failures, Constantinople, the capital of the empire, fell into chaos. The grand vizier Abaza Siyavuş Pasha was killed by the rebels, and Ayaşlı İsmail Pasha became the acting grand vizier for one week. On 2 March 1688, he was appointed as full grand vizier by the sultan Süleyman II. His term, however, was very short (only spanning 61 days). During this term, he attempted to stem corruption, gaining him many enemies in the palace. His main enemy was Köprülü Fazıl Mustafa Pasha (a future grand vizier), who was the brother-in-law of the late grand vizier Abaza Siyavuş Pasha. After the intensive efforts of Fazıl Mustafa Pasha, İsmail Pasha was dismissed from office by sultan Süleyman II on 2 May.

== Death ==
İsmail Pasha was imprisoned in Kavala (in modern Greece) and then exiled to the island of Rhodes (in modern Greece). Now grand vizier, Köprülü Fazıl Mustafa accused Ayaşlı İsmail Pasha of seizing Abaza Siyavuş Pasha's fortune and asked for the fortune in return for pardon. Ayaşlı İsmail Pasha denied all accusations, and Fazıl Mustafa Pasha had him executed him later that year, in April 1690.

== See also ==
- List of Ottoman grand viziers
- Izmail Fortress, Izmail

Political offices
Preceded by Abaza Siyavuş Pasha	Grand Vizier of the Ottoman Empire; 2 March 1688 – 2 May 1688	Succeeded by Bekri Mustafa Pasha
