= Battle of Mohács (1687) =

Part of the Great Turkish War

Coordinates: 45°51′05″N 18°24′34″E

- Part of Great Turkish War
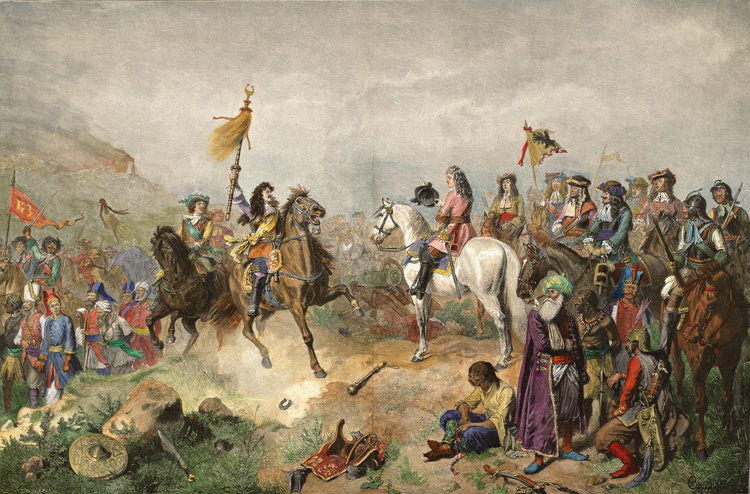
- Duke Charles V and Louis William at the Battle of Mohács by Wilhelm Camphausen
Date	12 August 1687
Location	Nagyharsány, Ottoman Hungary
Result	Holy Roman Empire victory

Belligerents
Holy Roman Empire	Ottoman Empire

Commanders and leaders
Charles of Lorraine; Maximilian II Emanuel; Margrave Ludwig Wilhelm; Enea Silvio Piccolomini; Eugene of Savoy; Nils Bielke; Jean-Louis de Bussy-Rabutin	Sarı Süleyman Paşa; Mustafa Pasha of Rodosto; Eseid Mustafa Pasha; Jafer Pasha

Strength
40,000 Habsburg troops 20,000 Bavarian troops Total: 50,000–60,000 men	60,000 men

Casualties and losses
2,000 killed and wounded 600 killed	10,000 8,000 killed and wounded 2,000 captured 78 guns 56 flags 5,000 muskets

The Second Battle of Mohács, also known as the Battle of Harsány Mountain, was fought on 12 August 1687 between the forces of Ottoman Sultan Mehmed IV, commanded by the Grand Vizier Sarı Süleyman Pasha, and the forces of Leopold I, Holy Roman Emperor, commanded by Charles of Lorraine. The result was a decisive victory for the Austrians.

The Second Battle of Mohács can be seen as a complete reversal of the First Battle of Mohács, as its aftermath led into the reconquest of the historical territories of Kingdom of Hungary and re-establishment of the kingdom under Habsburg rule.

== Background ==
The Great Turkish War began in July 1683 with an attack on Vienna by the Ottoman army. The siege was broken by the Battle of Vienna on 12 September, won by the combined forces of the Holy Roman Empire and the Polish–Lithuanian Commonwealth, under the overall command of the King of Poland, John III Sobieski, who led the Polish forces. From September the initiative passed to the Imperial troops. In the following years the Imperial Habsburg armies under Charles of Lorraine drove the Ottomans back, conquering many fortresses (such as Esztergom, Vác, Pest). After the Battle of Buda they laid siege to and took over the former Hungarian capital of Buda. At the end of 1686 the Ottomans made peace overtures; however, the Habsburgs saw a chance to conquer the whole of Hungary and the overtures were rejected.

In April 1687 it was decided in Vienna that further military action should be taken. The main army (of about 40,000 troops) under the command of Duke Charles of Lorraine proceeded along the River Danube to Osijek on the River Drava, while another army of about 20,000 men under the command of Maximilian II Emanuel, Elector of Bavaria moved along the River Tisza to Szolnok and towards Petrovaradin. In the middle of July the two imperial armies met on the Danube and either marched overland or along the Drava to Osijek.

In contrast, the Ottoman army (of about 60,000 men), under the command of the Grand Vizier Sari Süleyman Paşa, stayed in front of the main River Drava crossing (with its 8 km-long wooden bridge) at Osijek in order to protect it, and then fortified this position. When the Imperial army arrived, the River Drava divided the two sides. At the end of July the Imperial army was able to make a bridgehead on the shores of the river and stood in battle array, to challenge the Ottomans. However, the Ottoman army remained passive and was satisfied with artillery bombardments of the weirs on the Drava, the bridges and the riverside.

As the Duke of Lorraine realized he was not able to attack the fortified Ottoman camp, he decided to leave the bridgehead after a few days. For this he was criticized both by his own sub-commanders and by the Emperor Leopold I. The move was interpreted by the Ottoman Grand Vizier as a sign of a loss of morale by the Habsburg troops, so he decided to follow them. In early August, the Ottoman army drove the Habsburg army back toward Mohács and an Ottoman fortified position. The Ottomans had also built this fortified position at Darda, hidden among the thick bushes so that it was not visible to the Habsburg army. For this reason Duke Charles of Lorraine did not suspect the presence of the Ottoman army in the vicinity.

== Battle ==
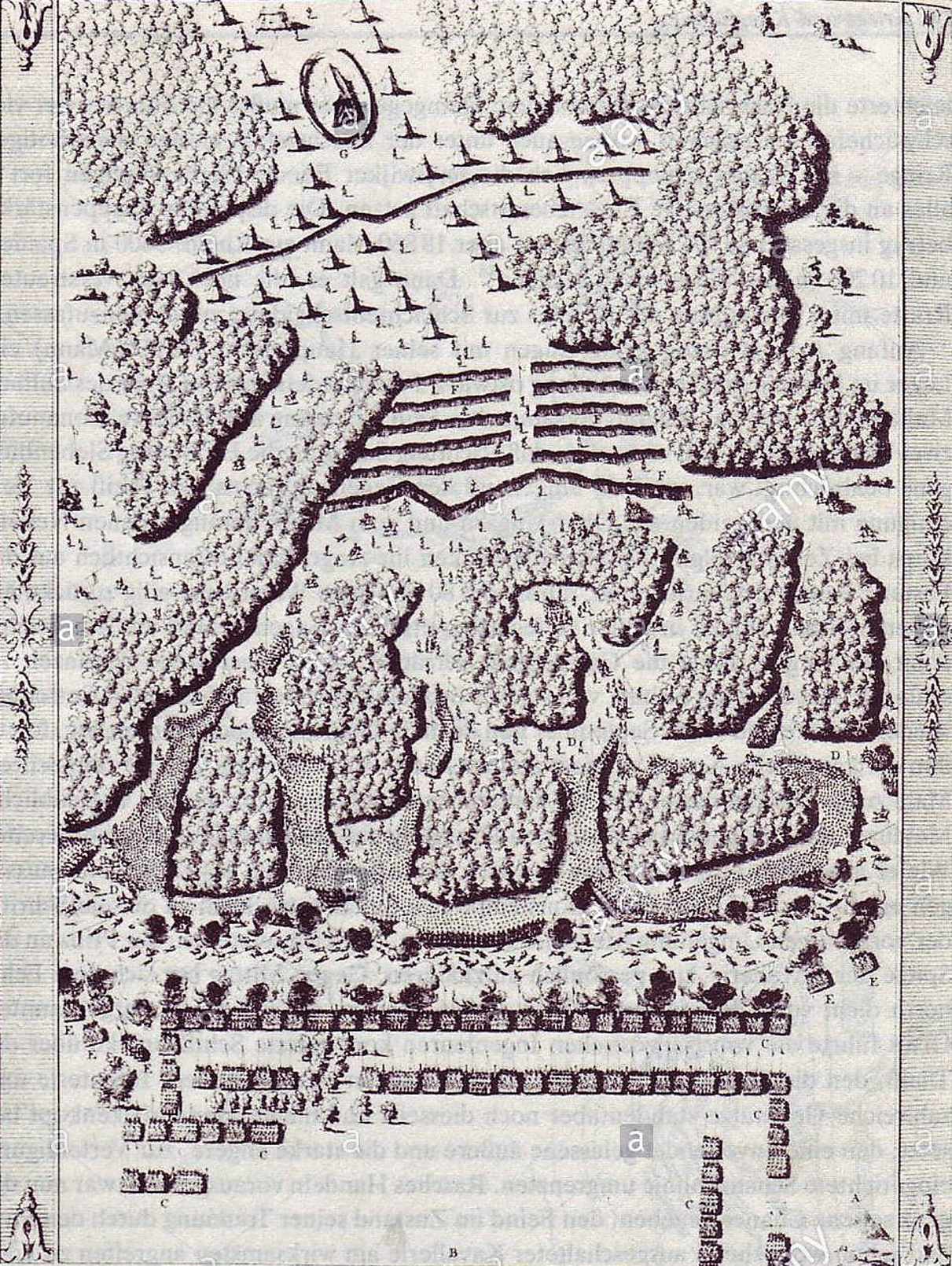
1732 scheme of the battle by Luigi Ferdinando Marsili.

On the morning of 12 August the Duke of Lorraine decided to move to Siklós, because the position and the hard ground there made it more appropriate as a battleground. The Habsburg right wing moving westward began to march through a densely forested area. Sari Süleyman Paşa decided that this was just the chance he was waiting for. He ordered an attack with his entire army on the Imperial army's left wing, which under Maximilian II Emanuel, Elector of Bavaria was still in its earlier position, and which according to the Habsburg battle plan was also to start marching west. The Ottoman army caught the Imperial army near Nagyharsány and the nearby Nagyharsány Hill, with its heavily wooded steep slopes. Their cavalry, consisting of 8,000 Sipahis, tried to outflank this Habsburg army wing from the left. The commander of the wing, the Elector of Bavaria, immediately sent a courier to the Duke of Lorraine, informing him that this wing was under threat. Orders were given and sent quickly and positions were taken immediately to resist the attack of the superior Ottoman forces, which had twice the number as the Imperial forces. The Habsburg infantry held their position, and Gen. Enea Silvio Piccolomini with some of his cavalry regiments successfully counterattacked and stopped the advance of the Ottoman Sipahi cavalry.

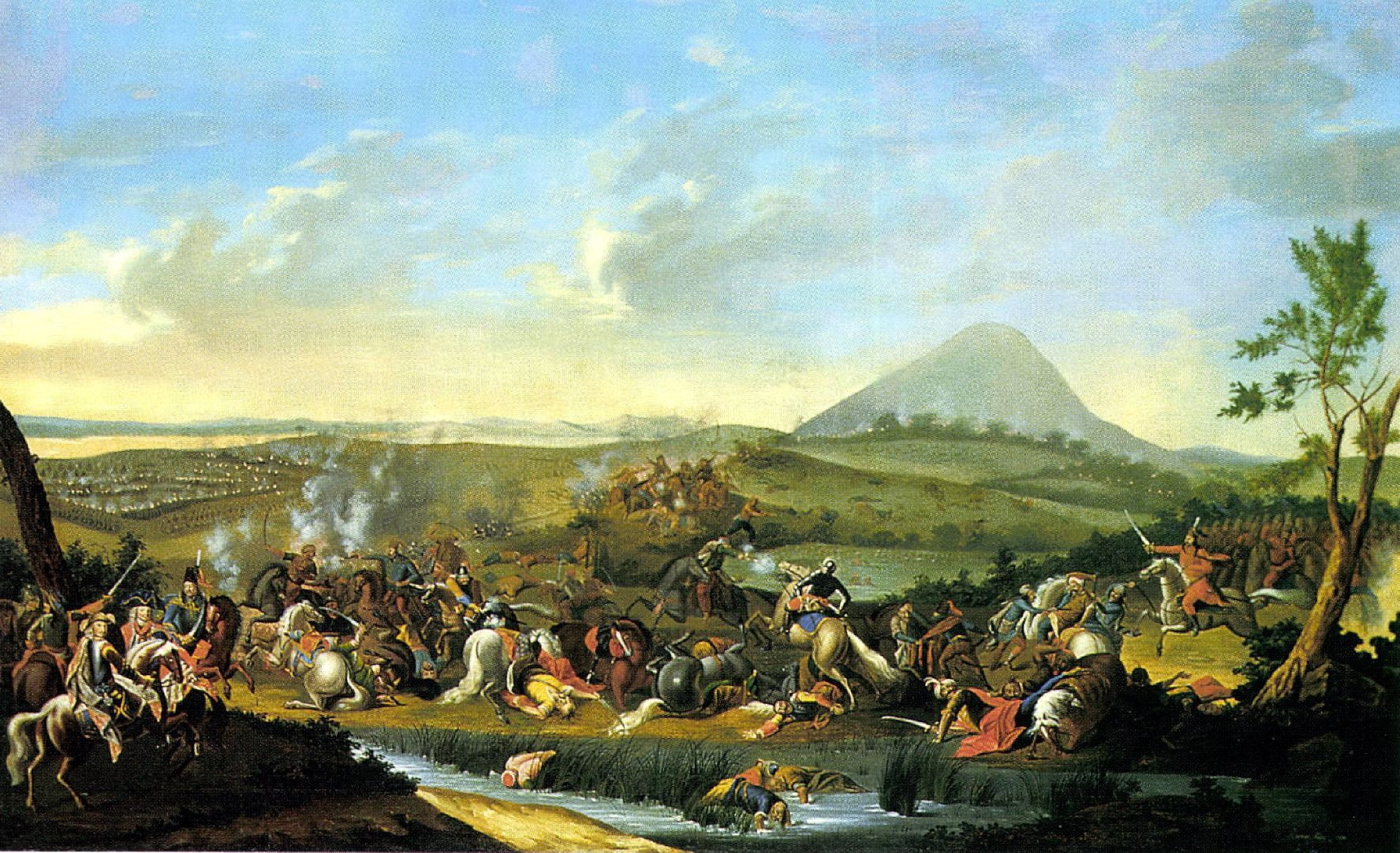
Battle of Mohács in 1687 by József Borsos (oil on canvas, 1837).

The Ottoman Grand Vizier was surprised by this unexpectedly fierce resistance and ordered the cessation of the Ottoman attack. The Ottoman artillery continued to fire on the Habsburg positions, but the infantry and cavalry troops were ordered to hold their positions and the infantry to go defensive behind the fortifications. This relative lull in fighting gave the right wing of the Habsburg army enough time to return to its original position. The Duke of Lorraine initially thought that his army should defend the positions, which might have led to a relative standstill. However, to gain the initiative, the Elector of Bavaria and Louis William, Margrave of Baden-Baden persuaded him to order a large-scale counterattack. The deployment of the Habsburg army for this counterattack was finished at 3:00 pm. At that same time Sari Süleyman Paşa decided to attack again alongside Mustafa Pasha of Rodosto, the Janissary Agha. Again, Sipahis supported the Janissary infantry frontal attack by attempting to outflank the Habsburg army. The Margrave of Baden-Baden successfully resisted the attack with his infantry squadrons and then went on to attack the still unfinished Ottoman defensive position. At the forefront of this Imperial penetrative attack on the Ottoman fortifications were troops under the command of the generals Ludwig Johann Graf Bussy-Rabutin and Prince Eugene of Savoy. The Ottoman attack and then resistance collapsed and Ottoman army retreated in a wild flight. The battle became a crushing defeat for the Ottomans.

Throughout the battle only the left wing of the Habsburg army saw the main action. There was a dense forest in front of the army's right wing that prevented it from attacking. Despite this, it attempted a bypassing maneuver on the right to force the relocation and withdrawal of the Ottomans, but its columns lost their way in the forest.

The losses of the Habsburg army were very light, about 600 men. The Ottoman army suffered huge losses, with an estimated 10,000 dead, as well as the loss of most of its artillery (about 66 guns) and much of its support equipment. The splendid command tent of the Grand Vizier and 160 Ottoman flags fell into Imperial hands. It is reported that the value of the share of the bounty that was given to the Elector of Bavaria surpassed two million golden ducats.

== Aftermath ==
After the battle, the Ottoman Empire fell into deep crisis. There was a mutiny among the troops. Grand Vizier Sari Suleyman Pasa became frightened that he would be killed by his own troops and fled from his command, first to Belgrade and then to Constantinople. When the news of the defeat and the mutiny arrived in Constantinople in early September, Abaza Siyavuş Pasha was appointed as the commander and as the Grand Vizier. However, before he could take over his command, the whole Ottoman army had disintegrated and the Ottoman household troops (Janissaries and Sipahis) started to return to their base in Constantinople under their own lower-rank officers. Even the Grand Vizier's regent in Constantinople was frightened and hid. Sari Suleyman Pasa was executed. Sultan Mehmed IV appointed the commander of Bosphorus Straits Köprülü Fazıl Mustafa Pasha as the Grand Vizier's regent in Constantinople. He consulted with the leaders of the army that existed and other leading Ottoman statesmen. After these, on 8 November it was decided to depose Sultan Mehmed IV and to enthrone Suleiman II as the new Sultan.

The disintegration of the Ottoman army allowed Imperial armies to rapidly traverse and reconquer large swathes of flatland and its towns before subsequently reaching more mountainous areas. The Imperial armies took over most major settlements, namely the towns of Osijek, Petrovaradin, Sremski Karlovci, Ilok, Valpovo, Požega, Arad, Timisoara, Palota and Eger. Most of present-day historical regions of Slavonia and Transylvania came under Imperial rule. On 9 December there was organised a Diet of Pressburg (today Bratislava, Slovakia), and Archduke Joseph was crowned as the first hereditary king of Hungary, and descendant Habsburg emperors were declared the anointed kings of Hungary. For a year the Ottoman Empire was paralysed, and Imperial forces were poised to capture Belgrade and penetrate deep into the Balkans.
