= Roshnik =

- Administrative unit
- Location within Albania
- Coordinates: 40°44′N 20°2′E
- Country: Albania
- County: Berat
- Municipality: Berat

Area
  - Municipality: 78.75 km^{2} (30.41 sq mi)

Population (2011)
  - Municipality: 2,513
  - Municipality density: 31.91/km^{2} (82.65/sq mi)
- Time zone: UTC+1 (CET)
  - Summer (DST): UTC+2 (CEST)

Roshnik is a commune in Berat County, central Albania. At the 2015 local government reform it became a subdivision of the municipality Berat. The population at the 2011 census was 2,513. The Köprülü family of Ottoman viziers came from this municipality.

== Geography ==
Roshnik is located in northern Berat County and is part of Berat municipality. It borders the commune of Vërtop to the south, Zhepë to the east, Berat and Otllak to the west, and Lumas to the north. Roshnik is approximately 9km (5.5mi) from the main city of Berat.

It is subdivided into the following villages: Bogdan i Poshtëm, Bogdan i Sipërm, Dardhë, Karkanjoz, Kostren i Madh, Kostren i Vogël, Mimias, Perisnak, Qafë Dardhë, Roshnik Qendër, Roshnik i Vogël, Vojnik, Rabjak.

== Demographics ==
As of the 2011 census, the municipality has 2,513 residents in 1,298 housing units, with a population density of 31.9/km^{2}.

535 residents, 21% of the total population, were under the age of 14. There were 288 people who were older than 65, accounting for 11% of the population. The gender ratio is roughly even, with 1,259 females and 1,254 males. The population are ethnically Albanian, which speak Albanian in the Tosk dialect.

== Notable person ==
- Köprülü Mehmed Pasha
