= Karamustafapaşa, Merzifon =

Karamustafapaşa
- Village
- Location within Turkey
- Coordinates: 40°53′N 35°30′E
- Country: Turkey
- Province: Amasya
- District: Merzifon
- Population (2021): 212
- Time zone: UTC+3 (TRT)

Karamustafapaşa is a village in the Merzifon District, Amasya Province, Turkey. Its population is 212 (2021). The village is named after Kara Mustafa Pasha, a 17th-century grand vizier of the Ottoman Empire.
