= Bayburtlu Kara Ibrahim Pasha =

Grand Vizier of the Ottoman Empire from 1683 to 1685

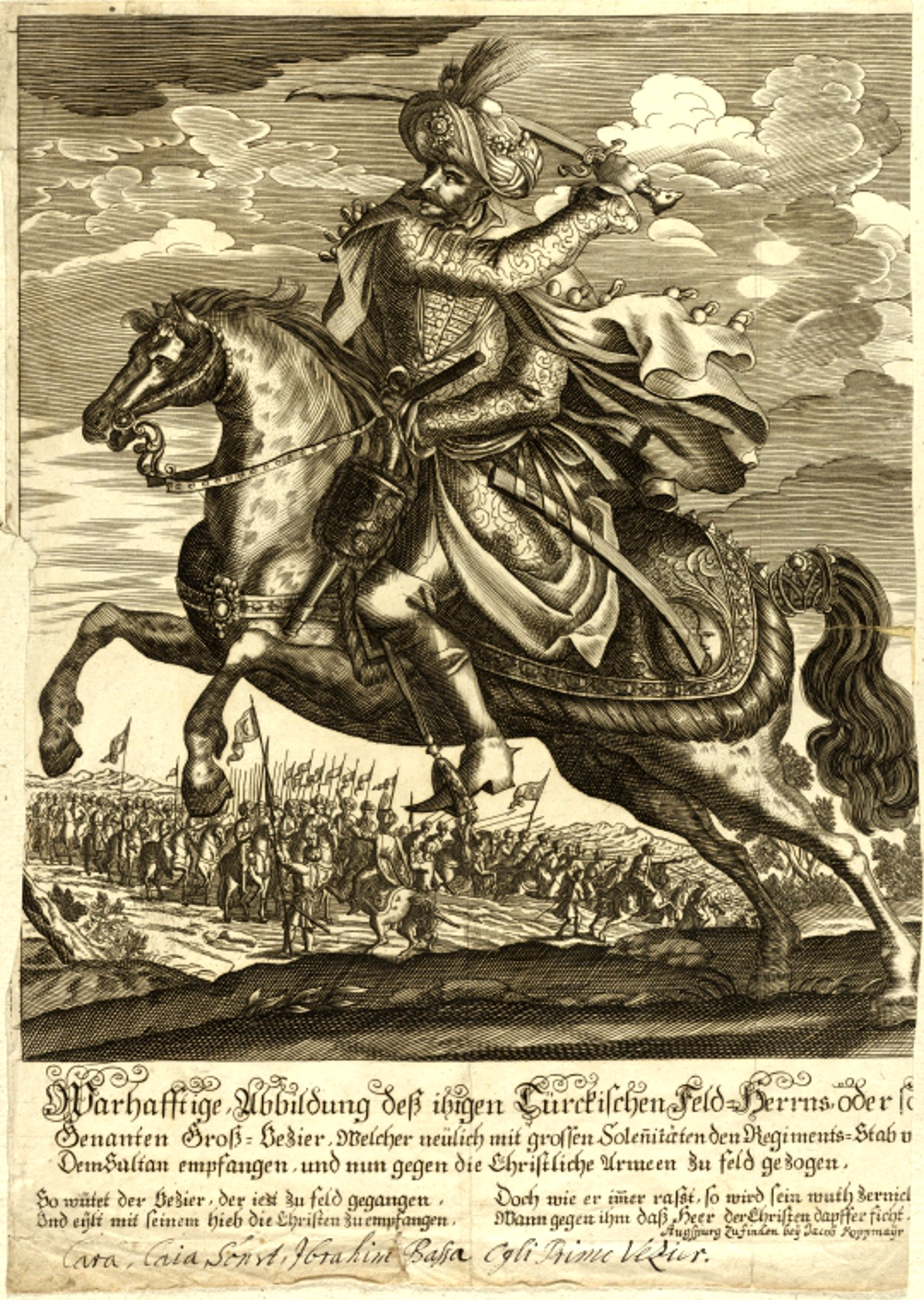
Bayburtlu Kara Ibrahim Pasha

Bayburtlu Kara Ibrahim Pasha (Turkish: Bayburtlu Kara İbrahim Paşa; "Ibrahim Pasha the Courageous of Bayburt" c. 1620-21 – 1687) was an Ottoman statesman. He was Grand Vizier of the Ottoman Empire from 25 December 1683 to 18 November 1685. He was also the Ottoman governor of Egypt from 1669 to 1673. He was of Turkish origin from Bayburt.

== See also ==
- List of Ottoman grand viziers
- List of Ottoman governors of Egypt

Political offices
Preceded by Karakaş Ali Pasha	Ottoman Governor of Egypt; 1669–1673	Succeeded by Canpuladzade Hüseyin Pasha
Preceded by Kara Mustafa Pasha	Grand Vizier of the Ottoman Empire; 25 December 1683 – 18 November 1685	Succeeded by Sarı Süleyman Pasha
