= Köprülü Mehmed Pasha =

Grand Vizier of the Ottoman Empire from 1656 to 1661

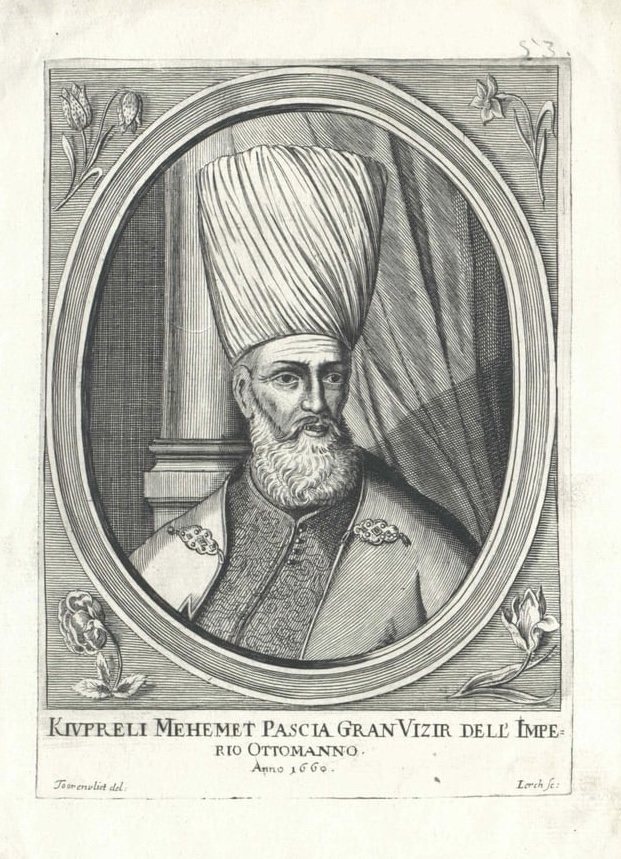

Grand Vizier of the Ottoman Empire
- In office 15 September 1656 – 31 October 1661
- Monarch: Mehmed IV
- Preceded by: Boynuyaralı Mehmed Pasha
- Succeeded by: Köprülü Fazıl Ahmed Pasha

Personal details
- Born: c. 1575 Roshnik, Sanjak of Avlona, Ottoman Empire (now Albania)
- Died: 31 October 1661 (aged 85–86) Edirne, Ottoman Empire (modern Turkey)
- Spouse: Ayşe Hanım
- Relations: Köprülüzade Numan Pasha (grandson); Amcazade Köprülü Hüseyin Pasha (nephew); Kara Mustafa Pasha (son-in-law); Abaza Siyavuş Pasha (son-in-law); Kaplan Mustafa Paşa (son-in-law)
- Children: Köprülüzade Fazıl Ahmed Pasha; Köprülüzade Fazıl Mustafa Pasha; Ali Bey; Fatıma Hanım; Hatice Hanım; Saliha Hanım
- Family: Köprülü family

Köprülü Mehmed Pasha (Ottoman Turkish: كپرولی محمد پاشا, Turkish: Köprülü Mehmet Paşa, pronounced [ˈcœp.ɾy.ly mehˈmet paˈʃa]; Albanian: Mehmed Pashë Kypriljoti or Qyprilliu, also called Mehmed Pashá Rojniku; c. 1575 – 31 October 1661) was Grand Vizier of the Ottoman Empire of Albanian origin and founding patriarch of the Köprülü political dynasty. He helped rebuild the power of the empire by rooting out corruption and reorganizing the Ottoman army. As he introduced these changes, Köprülü also expanded the borders of the empire, defeating the Cossacks, the Hungarians, and most impressively, the Venetians. Köprülü's effectiveness was matched by his reputation.

== Biography ==
=== Early life ===
He was born in the village of Roshnik in the Sanjak of Berat, Albania to ethnic Albanian parents.

=== Rise through the imperial service ===
He eventually rose to the rank of pasha and was appointed the beylerbey (provincial governor) of the Trebizond Eyalet in 1644. Mehmed Pasha's early rise was facilitated by his participation in patronage networks with other Albanians in the Ottoman administration. His main patron was the Albanian Grand Vizier Kemankeş Kara Mustafa Pasha who secured Köprülü Mehmed's appointment as mirahor.

Later he was to rule the provinces of Eğri in 1647, of Karaman in 1648, and of Anatolia in 1650. He served as vizier of the divan for one week in 1652 before being dismissed due to the constant power struggle within the palace.

In 1656, the political situation in the Ottoman Empire was critical. The war in Crete against the Venetians was still continuing. The Ottoman Navy under Kapudan Pasha (grand admiral) Kenan Pasha, in May 1656, was defeated by the Venetian and Maltese navy at the Battle of Dardanelles (1656) and the Venetian navy continued the blockade of the Çanakkale Straits, cutting the Ottoman army in Crete from Constantinople, the state capital. There was a political plot to unseat the reigning Sultan Mehmed IV led by important viziers including the Grand Mufti (Şeyhülislam) Hocazade Mesut Efendi. This plot was discovered, and the plotters were executed or exiled. The Valide Sultana (sultan's mother) Turhan Hatice conducted consultations and the most favored candidate for the post of Grand Vizier came out as the old and retired but experienced Köprülü Mehmed Pasha.

=== Grand Vizier ===
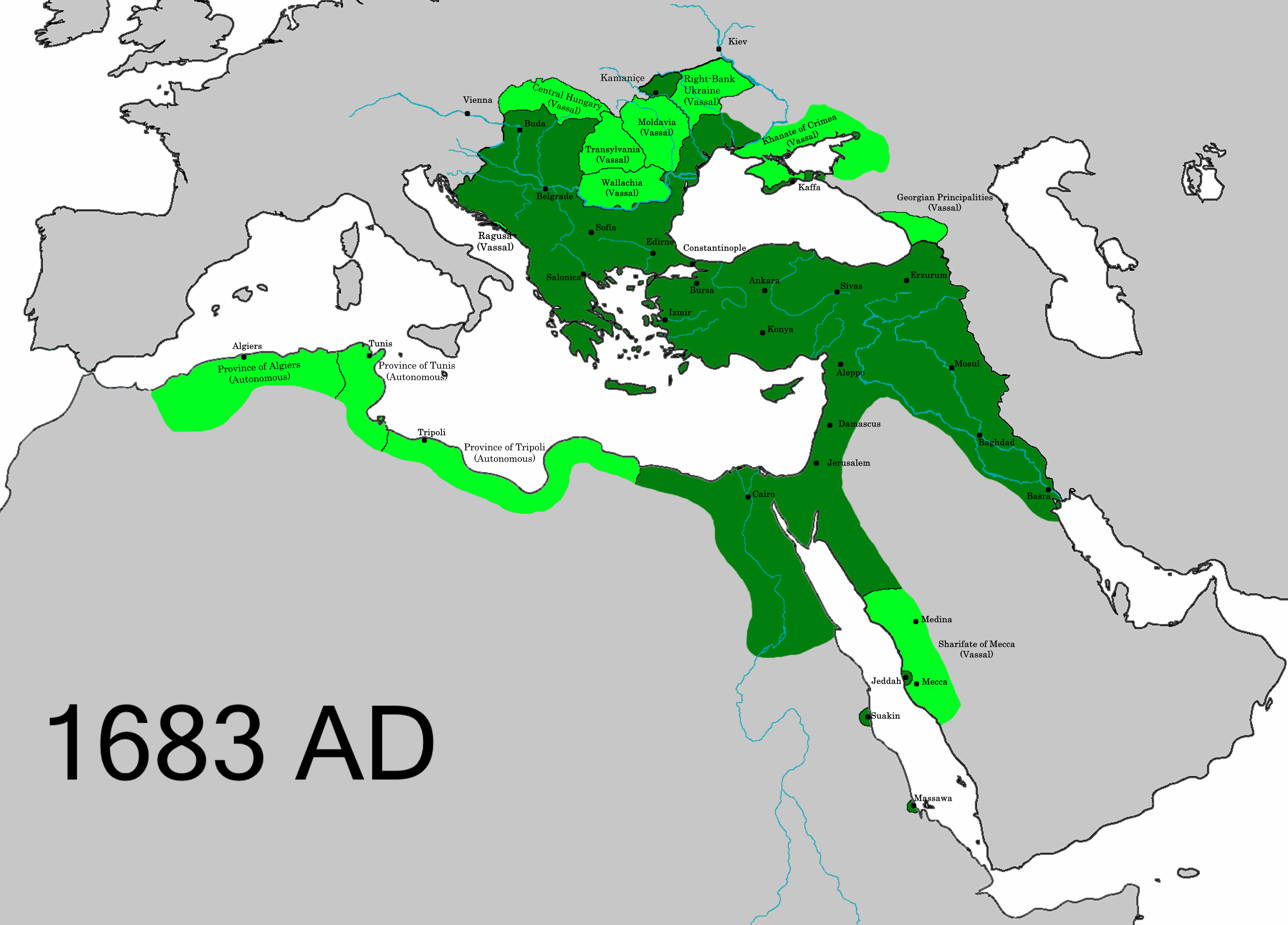
The Ottoman Empire reached the peak of its expansion during the administration of the Köprülü household.

Köprülü was called to Istanbul, where he accepted the position of Grand Vizier on 14 September 1656. He spoke to the Valide Sultan about the terms for him to accept appointment as Grand Vizier and she agreed to the terms. He was given extraordinary powers and political rule without interference, even from the highest authority of the Sultan. Of course, he gave reports on governance to Turhan Sultan, and in many administrative matters she supported him. Thus, historians saw her and him as the mainstay of the Ottoman state.

In order to prevent the Valide Sultan or any other person from the harem from exercising power in their affairs, he proposed to confirm and declare the sultan's adulthood. As the Grand Vizier, his first task was to advise Sultan Mehmed IV to conduct a life of hunts and traveling around the Balkans and to reside in the old capital of Edirne, thus stopping his direct political involvement in the management of the state. On 4 January 1657, the household cavalry Sipahi troops in Constantinople started a rebellion and this was cruelly suppressed by Köprülü Mehmed Pasha with the help of Janissary troops. The Greek Orthodox Patriarch of Constantinople was proven to be in treasonous contacts with the enemies of Ottoman state and Köprülü Mehmed Pasha approved of his execution.

The Sultan gave the Grand Vizier the absolute authority over the life and property of the Ottoman government and people and assured him that anyone who opposed him for any purpose could be executed for disobeying the order.

=== War with Venice ===
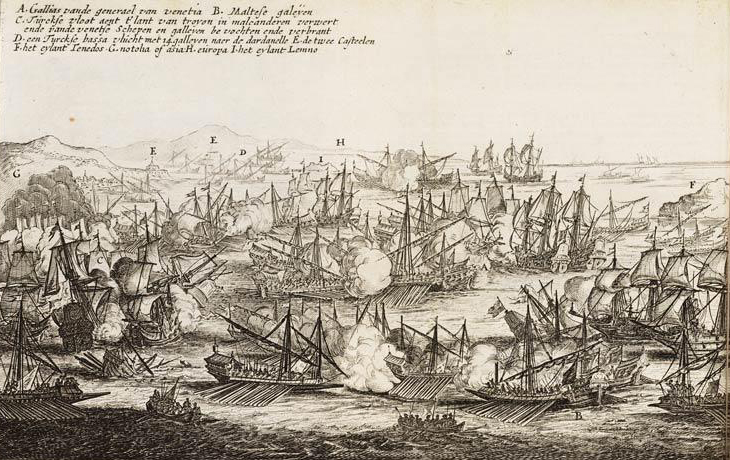
Battle of the Dardanelles on 19 July 1657.

He started on a military expedition against the Venetian blockade of Dardanelles Straits. The Ottoman navy had a victory against Venice in the Battle of the Dardanelles on 19 July 1657. This allowed the Ottomans to regain some of the Aegean islands, including Bozcaada and Limni (15 November) and to open the sea-supply routes to the Ottoman Army still conducting the sieges of Crete.

=== War with Transylvania and the Habsburgs ===
In 1658 he conducted a successful campaign in Transylvania. He also annexed Yanova (Jenő) on 1 August 1660 and Várad on 27 August. By annexing more territory in Hungary, he intended to directly threaten the Austrian capital Vienna.

=== Revolt of Abaza Hasan Pasha ===
Köprülü Mehmed Pasha's campaign against Transylvania was cut short by the large-scale revolt of several eastern provincial governors under the leadership of Abaza Hasan Pasha, then the governor of Aleppo. The rebels opposed Köprülü Mehmed's violent purges of the military and demanded that he be killed. However, Sultan Mehmed IV remained steadfast in his support for Köprülü and dispatched an army against the rebels under the command of Murtaza Pasha, who was then guarding the Safavid frontier. Despite assembling a force of 30,000 men and defeating Murtaza Pasha in battle, the harsh winter and fading morale eventually forced the rebels to capitulate. Abaza Hasan's revolt was finally brought to an end in February 1659 with the assassination of all the rebel commanders in Aleppo, despite promises that they would be spared.

=== Ayazmakapi Fire ===
In July 1660 there was a big fire in Istanbul (the Ayazmakapi Fire) causing great damage to persons and buildings, leading later to a food scarcity and plague. Köprülü Mehmed Pasha became personally involved in the reconstruction affairs. The honesty and integrity in conducting state affairs by Köprülü Mehmed Pasha is shown by an episode in this task. The burnt-out Jewish quarters from the Ayazmakapi Fire were decided to be compulsorily purchased by the state.

=== Death and legacy ===
Despite his advanced age, Köprülü continued to display immense energy until the end of his life. When he fell mortally ill in the autumn of 1661, Sultan Mehmed IV visited him at his bedside. Köprülü convinced the Sultan to appoint his son, Köprülü Fazıl Ahmed Pasha, as the next Grand Vizier. He also famously provided the young Sultan with four pieces of deathbed advice: never listen to the advice of women, never appoint a minister who is too wealthy, keep the state treasury constantly full, and always keep the army on the move.

Köprülü died on 31 October 1661 in Edirne, leaving behind a highly efficient administrative machine that restored the empire's internal stability and international prestige. His strategic victories in Transylvania also succeeded in pushing the Ottoman border closer to Austria.

== Family ==
While stationed in Köprü in Anatolia, he married Ayşe Hatun (Hanım), daughter of Yusuf Ağa, a notable originally from Kayacık, a village of Havza in Amasya. Yusuf Ağa was a voyvoda who built a bridge in Kadegra, that thus became Köprü, from which the family name of Mehmed (who was originally stationed there, and where he was sanjak-bey) was taken. Together they had a number of children, amongs them Köprülüzade Fazıl Ahmed Pasha, Köprülüzade Fazıl Mustafa Pasha (father of Köprülüzade Damat Numan Pasha and Köprülüzade Abdüllah Pasha) and at least two daughters, who married Abaza Siyavush Pasha and Kara Mustafa Pasha.

== See also ==
- Köprülü era
- Köprülü family
- List of Ottoman grand viziers

== Bibliography ==
- Wasiucionek, Michal (2016). Politics and Watermelons: Cross-Border Political Networks in the Polish-Moldavian-Ottoman Context in the Seventeenth Century (PDF) (Thesis). European University Institute.

Political offices
Preceded by Boynuyaralı Mehmed Pasha	Grand Vizier of the Ottoman Empire; 15 September 1656 – 31 October 1661	Succeeded by Köprülü Fazıl Ahmed Pasha
