= Abaza Siyavuş Pasha =

Grand Vizier of the Ottoman Empire from 1687 to 1688

Grand Vizier of the Ottoman Empire
- In office 18 September 1687 – 23 February 1688
- Monarchs: Mehmed IV; Süleyman II
- Preceded by: Sarı Süleyman Pasha
- Succeeded by: Ayaşlı Ismail Pasha

Personal details
- Died: 23 February 1688 Constantinople, Ottoman Empire

Abaza Siyavuş Pasha (died 23 February 1688) was for a short period grand vizier of the Ottoman Empire who held the post during one of the most chaotic periods of the empire.

== Early years ==
He was of Abkhazian origin. He was a servant of Köprülü Mehmed Pasha, an able grand vizier who died in 1661. By marrying Köprülü Mehmed Pasha's daughter, he became a relative of the powerful Köprülü family. Together with his brothers-in-law (Köprülüzade Fazıl Ahmed Pasha and Köprülüzade Fazıl Mustafa Pasha), he participated in a number of military campaigns. In 1684, Buda (a part of Budapest, the capital of modern Hungary, then a part of the Ottoman Empire) had been besieged by the Austrians under the command of Maximilian. Siyavuş Pasha stormed the Austrians and forced them to lift the siege. This was one of the few Turkish victories in the Great Turkish War.

== As a grand vizier ==
Ottoman sultan Mehmet IV ("the Hunter") was inattentive to state affairs, especially in the war. The soldiers as well as the other subjects of the empire accused him and grand vizier Sarı Süleyman Pasha of the failures in the war. In 1687, the army returned from the front and staged a coup in which both the sultan and the grand vizier were forced to abdicate and resign, respectively. Siyavuş became the new grand vizier on 18 September, and Süleyman II became the new sultan on 8 November. However, Siyavuş was not successful as a grand vizier. He failed to control the troops which encamped on the outskirts of Constantinople. The soldiers demanded the payment of bonus salary (traditional payments of the new sultans, Turkish: Cülus bahşişi). But the treasury was unable to make the payment and the soldiers caused unrest in the city. Although Siyavuş was their candidate for the post, they soon began to oppose Siyavuş and his brother-in-law Köprülü Mustafa Pasha. The Janissaries raided his house and killed him on 23 February 1688.

== See also ==
- List of Ottoman grand viziers

Political offices
Preceded by Sarı Süleyman Pasha	Grand Vizier of the Ottoman Empire; 18 September 1687 – 23 February 1688	Succeeded by Ayaşlı Ismail Pasha
