= Kara Mustafa Pasha =

Grand Vizier of the Ottoman Empire from 1676 to 1683

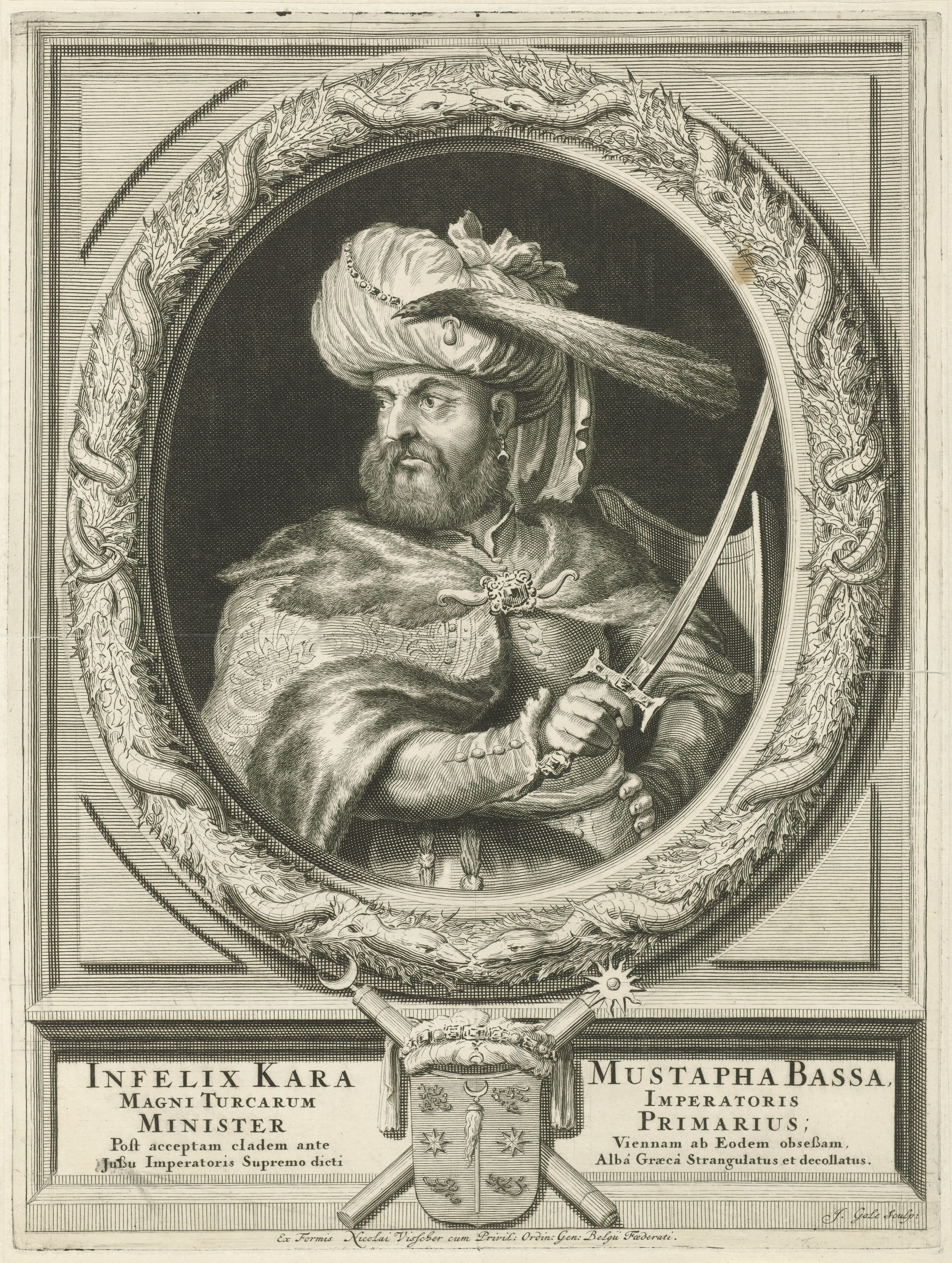
- Imaginative portrait of Kara Mustafa Pasha, 1670-1724, Netherlands

Grand Vizier of the Ottoman Empire
- In office 19 October 1676 – 25 December 1683
- Monarch: Mehmed IV
- Preceded by: Köprülü Fazıl Ahmed Pasha
- Succeeded by: Bayburtlu Kara Ibrahim Pasha

Personal details
- Born: 1634 or 1635 Mırınca near Merzifon, Rum Eyalet (today Karamustafapaşa)
- Died: 25 December 1683 Belgrade, Budin Eyalet
- Spouse(s): Köprülüzade Saliha Hatun; Fatma Hatun; Ayşe Hatun; Emine Hatun; Zeynep Hatun
- Relations: Köprülü Mehmed Pasha (father-in-law); Köprülüzade Fazıl Ahmed Pasha (brother-in-law); Köprülüzade Fazıl Mustafa Pasha (brother-in-law)
- Children: Yusuf Pasha; Mehmed Pasha; Ali Pasha
- Origins: Turkish
- Family: Köprülü family (adoptive)

Military service
- Allegiance: Ottoman Empire
- Branch/service: Ottoman Navy; Ottoman Army
- Years of service: 1660s–1683
- Rank: Grand Admiral (1666–70); Commander-in-Chief (1676–83)
- Battles/wars: Polish–Ottoman War (1672–76); Russo-Turkish War (1676–81); Chyhyryn campaign (1674); Siege of Uman; Battles of Ladyzhyn; Chyhyryn campaign (1678); Battle of Dnieper river (1678); Siege of Kaniv (1678); Polish–Ottoman War (1683–99); Great Turkish War (1683–99) (executed); Battle of Vienna (1683); Battle of Párkány (1683)

Kara Mustafa Pasha (Ottoman Turkish: قره مصطفى پاشا; Turkish: Kara Mustafa Paşa; "Mustafa Pasha the Courageous"; 1634/1635 – 25 December 1683) was an Ottoman nobleman, military figure and grand vizier, who was a central character in the Ottoman Empire's last attempts at expansion into both Central and Eastern Europe.

== Early life and career ==
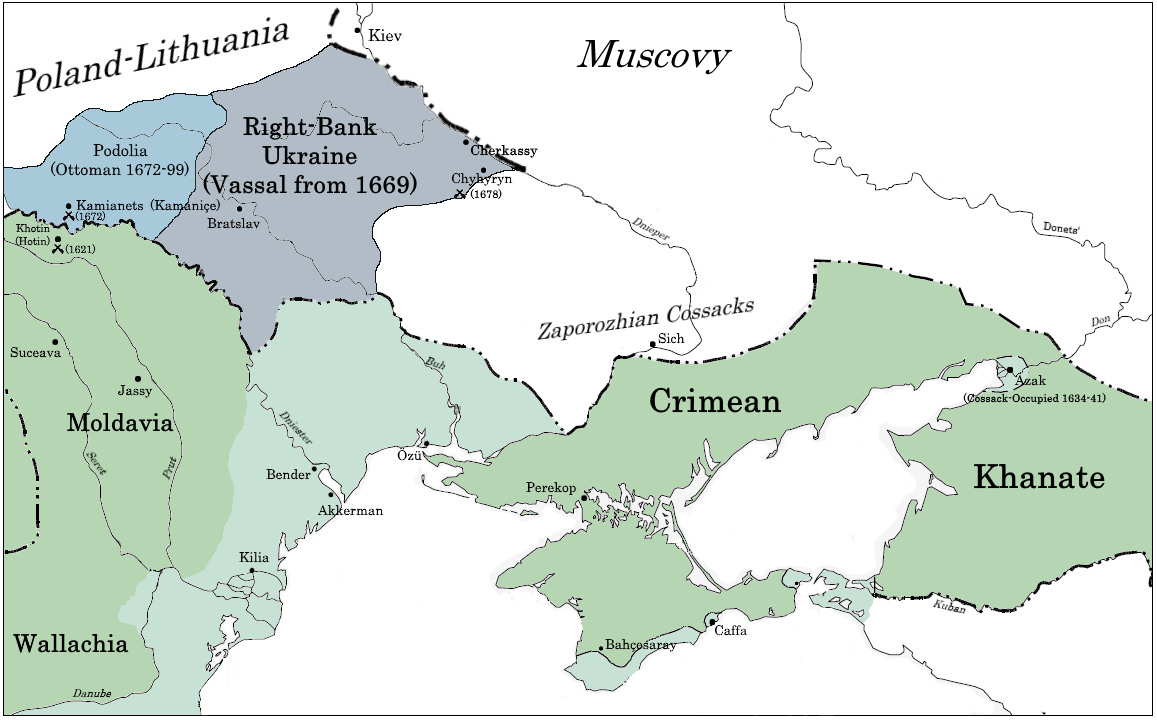
The 17th-century Ottoman northern frontier, where Kara Mustafa Pasha led his early campaigns

Kara Mustafa Pasha was of Turkish origin. However, he was brought up in the Köprülü family, of Albanian origin. He was born in the village of Mirince/Marınca near Merzifon (now called Karamustafapaşa after him), the son of a sipahi (cavalry man). His father is said to have served under Köprülü Mehmed Pasha. Possibly as a way to increase his opportunities to pursue an administrative career, he was introduced into the Köprülü household, where he was educated by Köprülü Mehmed Pasha, and married into the Köprülü family. How he entered the family and the details of his marriage are unclear. Within the household's inner service (enderun), he held the positions of letter-carrier (telhisci, or assistant to the grand vizier) to Köprülü Mehmed Pasha, and of silahdar (armourer). He then entered the household of the Sultan as mirahor-i-sani (master of the horse). It is said that while growing up differently from his adoptive Köprülü brothers, he disliked alcohol, as well as Europeans and other non-Muslims. A contemporary French account says he had two children with the little Köprülü princess, who both died young, and that his wife died shortly after their death, at 31. He had four concubines (Fatma, Emine, Ayşe, Zeynep) and by them at least two sons: Yusuf and Mehmed. According to another contemporary report by Giovanni Benaglia, secretary of the Austrian ambassador in Istanbul, he divorced his "beloved Köprülü princess" after their engagement and after they had many children, and he gave her to a French renegade, one of his favourites. An account by a contemporary who visited his household, Claudio Angelo di Martelli, reports of three sons who survived his death: Yusuf, Mehmed and (the youngest) Ali.

He conformed to the Islamic custom of not wearing silk and never wore silver or gold, which was a largely unenforced requirement. Europeans who met him (with few exceptions, such as Colyer, who initially described him as a man of "most agreeable nature") variously described him as greedy, humorous but terse, avid, intransigent, perfidious, covetous, unwilling to accept bribes yet concerned with improving his own well-being, and completely devoted to the Ottoman state. Later accounts by Giovanni Morosini di Alvise, Venetian bailo of Istanbul from 1675 to 1680, speak of a man "born in an obscure place of Asia, in Trebisonda, to castigate the nations" and describe him as "wholly venal, cruel and unfair." The English ambassador to Istanbul, John Finch, also describes him as greedy and a "grievous oppressor of Christendom." He was particularly "unbearable to Europeans", especially for the heavy taxes that he imposed (a "stream of avanias in the years 1676-1683"). Even though his adoptive siblings also imposed notable avanias, their reputation with Europeans was not as bad.

Merlijn Orlon notes that his bad reputation does not do him justice and explains that he worked to maintain the House of Osman's supremacy in its own territories and clashed with ambitious foreign ministers, which resulted in his bad reputation. He dealt differently with the Dutch for political reasons, which resulted in Colyer's more positive account of him. As the French wars ended, a preferential treatment of the Dutch became useless, and as a result, Mustafa's relationship with Colyer grew troubled. He had also made many enemies in the Ottoman army and palace because of his terse attitude and stubbornness. He was rumoured to be a talented general and commander but too fond of fame and glory, arrogant, and rude.

In 1659, he had become a governor of Silistria and subsequently held a number of important posts. Within ten years, he was acting as deputy for his brother-in-law, the grand vizier Köprülüzade Fazıl Ahmed Pasha when absent from the Sultan's court.

He served as a commander of ground troops in a war against Poland, negotiating a settlement with John Sobieski in 1676 that added the province of Podolia to the empire. The victory enabled the Ottomans to transform the Cossack regions of the southern Russian Empire into a protectorate. When his brother-in-law Köprülü Fazıl Ahmed Pasha died that same year, Mustafa succeeded him as grand vizier.

Kara Mustafa led several successful campaigns into the Tsardom of Russia, attempting to shore up the position of the Cossack state, then an Ottoman vassal. He established Ottoman garrisons in many of Ukraine's cities, and conquered the traditional Cossack capital of Chyhyryn, which had been under Russian occupation.

During his campaign, he successfully conquered the fortress of Chigirin. He pursued Grigory Romodanovsky and met him in the battle of the Dnieper River between August 14 and 20. Despite the losses on both sides, neither commander achieved a decisive victory over the other, and both were forced to retreat. Mustafa was forced to retreat because of severe logistical difficulties incurred from campaigning in the steppe and so was convinced by his commanders to retreat. After the battle, he conquered the powerful fortress of Kaniv by siege.

== Battle of Vienna ==
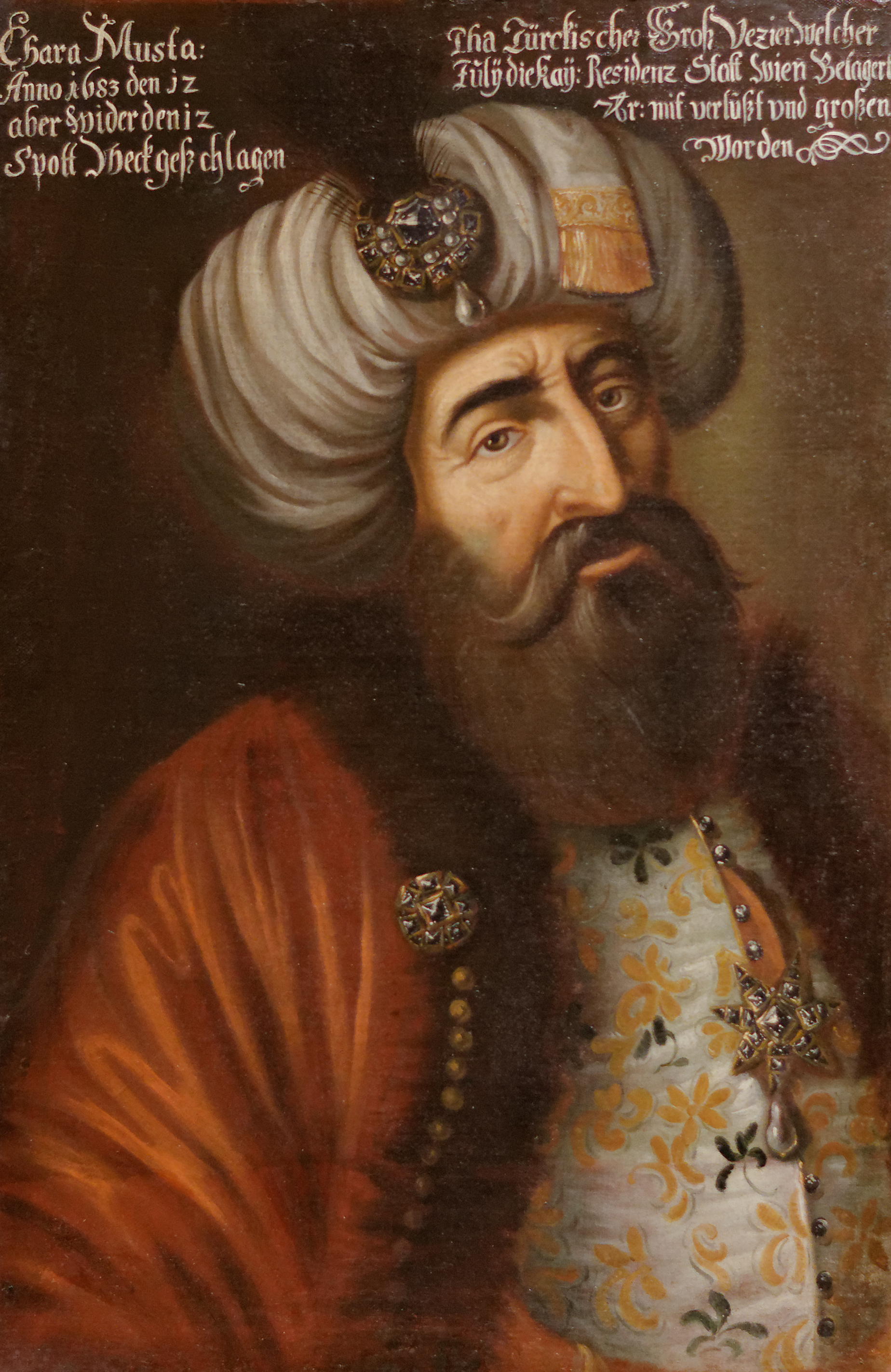
Imaginative portrait of Grand Vizier Kara Mustafa Pasha

In 1683, he launched a campaign northward into Austria in a last effort to expand the Ottoman Empire after more than 150 years of war. That was under his own initiative, and Mehmed IV was unaware of his plans. Because the siege was unplanned, his army lacked heavy siege cannons, which could help to capture Vienna. By mid-July, his 100,000-man army had besieged Vienna (guarded by 10,000 Habsburg soldiers) and followed in the footsteps of Suleiman the Magnificent in 1529. By September, he had taken a portion of the walls and appeared to be on his way to victory.

However, on 12 September 1683, a Polish army under King John III Sobieski took advantage of dissent within the Ottoman military command and the poor disposition of his troops to win the Battle of Vienna by a devastating flank attack led by Sobieski's Polish Winged Hussars. The Ottomans retreated into Hungary, much of which was subsequently conquered by the Habsburgs and their Holy League allies. It is said that he had many enemies because of his stubbornness, pride and general disrespect of others, and that contributed to his defeat since the other Ottoman generals and vassals would not help him during his troubles on the battlefield. Also, he had attacked Vienna on his own initiative without permission from the sultan, who had believed that the Ottoman campaign was against other smaller forts.

The defeat cost Mustafa his position and ultimately his life. On 25 December 1683, Kara Mustafa was executed in Belgrade at the order of Mehmed IV. He suffered death by strangulation with a silk cord, which was the method of capital punishment inflicted on high-ranking persons in the Ottoman Empire. His last words were, "Am I to die?" and "As God pleases."

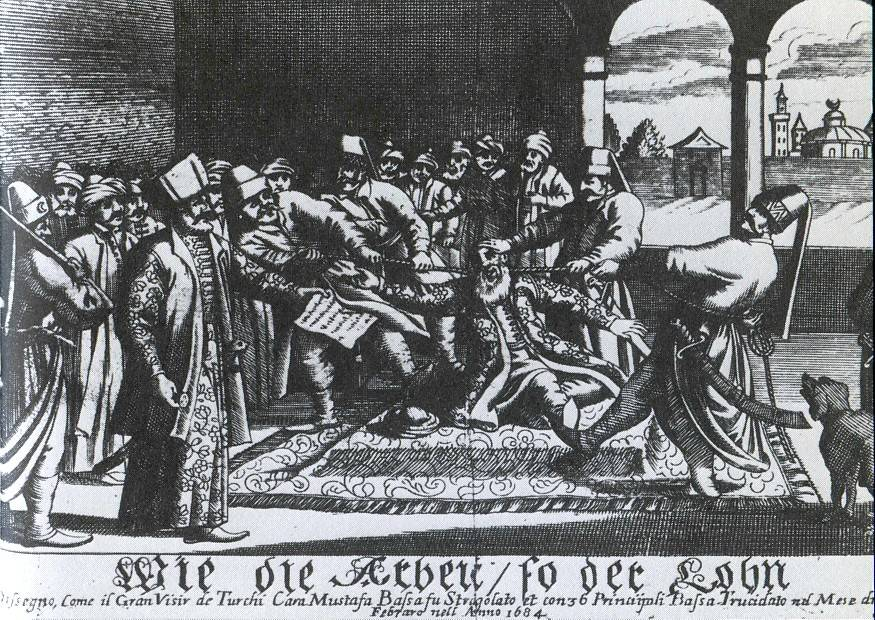
Kara Mustafa Pasha's strangulation by a silk cord on 25 December 1683.

== Legacy ==
The Foundation of Merzifonlu Kara Mustafa Pasha was one of the largest foundations ever founded both in the Ottoman Empire and Turkey. According to the official records, it was last managed by the descendants of Kara Mustafa Pasha. The last few managers of the foundation were Mustafa Pasha's descendant, Ahmed Asım Bey (born 1844), his son, Mehmed Nebil Bey (born 1888) (also known as Merzifonlu Karamustafaoğlu or Merzifonlu Karamustafapaşaoğlu), and his son, the Turkish painter Doğan Yılmaz Merzifonlu Karamustafaoğlu, better known as Yılmaz Merzifonlu (1928–2010), until 1976. The "Merzifonlu Karamustafaoğlu" family name ended with the marriage of Yılmaz Merzifonlu's only daughter, Abide Tuğçe Mit, to Burak Mit of the noble Circassian Mit family. Kara Mustafa Pasha's family and descendant tree can be found via Turkey's Directorate General of Foundations.

Kara Mustafa Pasha's legacy in modern Turkey is mixed. Whereas historians describe him as either a capable tactician or a reckless commander, Kemal Atatürk held a sympathetic view of the man. It is said that while attending a lecture at an Ankara institution in 1933 at which a professor spoke disparagingly of Kara Mustafa Pasha, Atatürk spoke up in favour of him by arguing that marching an army of 173,000 men from Constantinople to Vienna, the "heart of Europe", was a colossal undertaking for any commander and that the only other person who came close to such a feat was Sultan Suleiman the Magnificent himself.

Kara Mustafa's birthplace near Merzifon district was renamed Karamustafapaşa in his honour.

== In media ==
In the 2012 Polish-Italian historical drama film September Eleven 1683 about the Battle of Vienna, Kara Mustafa Pasha is portrayed by Italian actor Enrico Lo Verso.

== See also ==
- Köprülü era of the Ottoman Empire
- Köprülü family
- List of Ottoman grand viziers

Political offices
Preceded by Köprülü Fazıl Ahmed Pasha	Grand Vizier of the Ottoman Empire; 19 October 1676 – 25 December 1683	Succeeded by Bayburtlu Kara Ibrahim Pasha
