= Köprülüzade Fazıl Mustafa Pasha =

Grand Vizier of the Ottoman Empire from 1689 to 1691

Köprülü Gazi Fazıl Mustafa Pasha

Grand Vizier of the Ottoman Empire
- In office 10 November 1689 – 19 August 1691
- Monarchs: Süleyman II; Ahmed II
- Preceded by: Bekri Mustafa Pasha
- Succeeded by: Arabacı Ali Pasha

Personal details
- Born: 1637 Köprü (modern Vezirköprü, Samsun Province, Black Sea Region, Turkey)
- Died: 19 August 1691 (aged 53–54) Slankamen, Sanjak of Syrmia, Ottoman Empire (modern Stari Slankamen, Vojvodina, Serbia)
- Relations: Köprülüzade Fazıl Ahmed Pasha (brother); Kara Mustafa Pasha (brother-in-law); Abaza Siyavuş Pasha (brother-in-law); Amcazade Köprülü Hüseyin Pasha (cousin)
- Children: Köprülüzade Numan Pasha; Köprülüzade Abdüllah Pasha
- Parent(s): Köprülü Mehmed Pasha (father); Ayşe Hatun (mother)
- Origins: Albanian (father), Turkish (mother)
- Family: Köprülü family

Military service
- Allegiance: Ottoman Empire
- Years of service: 1660s–1691
- Rank: Commander-in-Chief, Serdar
- Battles/wars: Great Turkish War: Siege of Belgrade (1690); Battle of Slankamen †

Köprülüzade Fazıl Mustafa Pasha ("Köprülü Mustafa Pasha the Wise", also known as Gazi Fazıl Mustafa Köprülü (Albanian: Fazlli Mustafa Kypriljoti; Turkish: Köprülü Fazıl Mustafa Paşa) 1637 – 19 August 1691, Slankamen) served as the Grand Vizier of the Ottoman Empire from 1689 to 1691, when the Empire was engaged in a war against the Holy League countries in the Great Turkish War. He was the son of Köprülü Mehmed Pasha of Albanian origin and Ayşe Hatun of Turkish origin. He was thus a member of the Köprülü family through his father. His father, his elder brother Köprülü Fazıl Ahmed Pasha, as well as his two brothers-in-law (Kara Mustafa Pasha and Abaza Siyavuş Pasha) were former grand viziers. His epithet Fazıl means "wise" in Ottoman Turkish. He succeeded Bekri Mustafa Pasha as Grand Vizier.

== Rise to Power ==
He was the son of Köprülü Mehmed Pasha, an Albanian Vizier of the Ottoman Empire and the founder of the Köprülü family, and of Ayşe Hatun. The daughter of a notable originally from Kayacık, a village in Havza in Amasya. His parents met when his father was stationed in Köprü, formerly Kadegra, which got its name thanks to his maternal grandfather, who built a bridge (Turkish: köprü) there. He became a member of the Sultan's guards and spent much of his time on military campaigns with his brother Fazıl Ahmed. Thanks to his brother-in-law, grand vizier Merzifonlu Kara Mustafa Pasha, Fazıl Mustafa became the seventh vizier in the imperial council, and by 1683 he had risen to third vizier. After Kara Mustafa was defeated at Vienna, Fazıl Mustafa was sent away from Istanbul. In 1687 an army rebellion made his brother-in-law Abaza Siyavuş Pasha grand vizier and forced sultan Mehmed IV to abdicate in favor of his brother Süleyman II. Fazıl Mustafa apparently was closely involved in Mehmed IV's dethronement and rose to second vizier. Factional politics soon resulted in his exile from the capital, and he was only saved from execution by the grace of the şeyhülislam. Until 1689, Fazıl Mustafa served as commander of Chios and the Cretan cities of Khania and Iráklion.

== Grand Vizierate ==
After the Austrian victory at The Second Battle of Mohács, sultan Suleiman II was persuaded to appoint Köprülü Fazıl Mustafa Pasha as his grand vizier on 25 October 1689.

Like his relatives, Fazıl Mustafa Pasha was a skilled administrator and military commander. He followed his father's footsteps by having corrupt government/military officials from the previous sultanate removed and executed. They were replaced with men loyal to Fazıl Mustafa Pasha, who also aided the treasury by implementing strict military rolls, thereby preventing soldiers from collecting the salaries of their deceased comrades. He also proclaimed a general military mobilization of Muslim subjects and drafted Kurdish and Yörük tribesmen, thus increasing the number of conscripts.

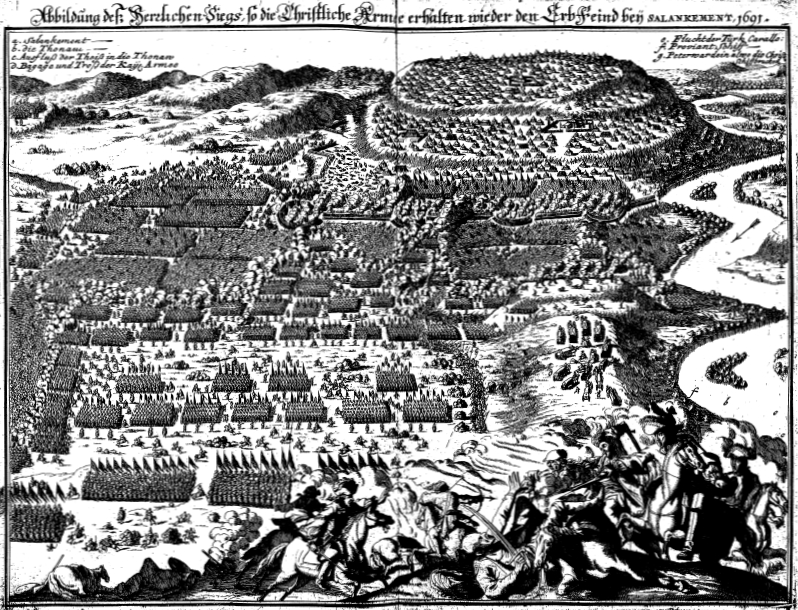
Grand Vizier Köprülü Fazıl Mustafa Pasha was killed during the Battle of Slankamen in 1691.

Other reforms eased the burden of the Empire's non-military subjects. Köprülü Fazıl Mustafa Pasha reformed the poll tax, paid by the empire's non-Muslim subjects, by restoring the policy of having taxes collected on individual adults (instead of collective assessment, which harmed communities whose populations had decreased due to war and other factors). Fazıl Mustafa Pasha also made it easier to issue permits to fix or rebuild Christian churches.

Having suffered from factionalism in the court and government, Fazıl Mustafa Pasha attempted to limit the number of viziers in the imperial council. To combat the abuse of power of local and regional authorities, he set up councils of notables in the provinces, modeling these on the imperial government. The far-reaching effects of his administrative reforms would last for decades.

== Military successes, disaster, and death ==
The course of the ongoing Great Turkish War worsened when Russia began its involvement and formally joined an alliance of European powers by launching the devastating Crimean campaigns. Under Fazıl Mustafa Pasha's leadership the Ottomans halted an Austrian advance into Serbia and crushed an uprising in Bulgaria.

Fazıl Mustafa Pasha's 1690 campaign brought further success, with the recapture of Niš, Vidin, Smederevo, and Golubac. He then besieged Belgrade, using 40,000 infantry and 20,000 cavalry. On 8 October, after the defenders' armory was destroyed in an explosion, the Habsburg commander capitulated. The recapture of Belgrade, originally conquered by the Ottomans in 1521 but lost to the Habsburgs in 1688, gave hope to the Ottomans that their military disasters of the 1680s, including the losses of Hungary and Transylvania, could be reversed.

The hope proved deceptive. On 19 August 1691, Fazıl Mustafa Pasha was struck in the forehead by a bullet at the Battle of Slankamen (northwest of Belgrade). The Ottomans suffered a devastating defeat at the hands of Ludwig Wilhelm von Baden, the commander-in-chief of the Imperial Army in Hungary, nicknamed "Türkenlouis" (Louis the Turk) for his victories. Called "the bloodiest battle of the century" by contemporaries, the defeat at Slankemen cost the lives of 20,000 men and the Ottoman's most capable military commander.

Fazıl Mustafa Pasha was the fifth member of the Köprülü family to serve as grand vizier. After his death, the Ottoman Empire suffered further defeats. By 1695, the Ottomans were left with only one piece of territory in Hungary.

== See also ==
- Köprülü era of the Ottoman Empire
- Köprülü family
- List of Ottoman grand viziers

Political offices
Preceded by Bekri Mustafa Pasha	Grand Vizier of the Ottoman Empire; 10 November 1689 – 19 August 1691	Succeeded by Arabacı Ali Pasha
