= Köprülüzade Fazıl Ahmed Pasha =

Grand Vizier of the Ottoman Empire from 1661 to 1676

Köprülü Fazıl Ahmed Pasha
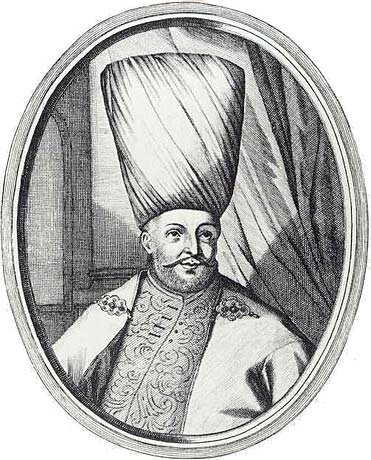

Grand Vizier of the Ottoman Empire
- In office 31 October 1661 – 3 November 1676
- Monarch: Mehmed IV
- Preceded by: Köprülü Mehmed Pasha
- Succeeded by: Kara Mustafa Pasha

Personal details
- Born: 1635 Vezirköprü (then named Köprü, present-day Samsun Province, Black Sea Region, Turkey)
- Died: 3 November 1676 (aged 40–41) Constantinople, Ottoman Empire
- Relations: Köprülüzade Fazıl Mustafa Pasha (brother); Köprülüzade Numan Pasha (nephew); Kara Mustafa Pasha (brother-in-law); Abaza Siyavuş Pasha (brother-in-law); Amcazade Köprülü Hüseyin Pasha (cousin)
- Parent(s): Köprülü Mehmed Pasha (father); Ayşe Hanım (mother)
- Origins: Albanian (father), Turkish (mother)
- Family: Köprülü family

Military service
- Allegiance: Ottoman Empire
- Battles/wars: Austro-Turkish War (1663–64); Siege of Nitra 1663; Siege of Novigrad 1663; Siege of Leva 1663; Battle of Köbölkút; Siege of Érsekújvár (1663); Siege of Novi Zrin (1664); Battle of Saint Gotthard (1664); Cretan War (1645–69); Siege of Candia; Polish–Ottoman War (1672–76); Siege of Kamenets; Battle of Khotyn (1673); Ukrainian campaign; Siege of Uman

The Coat of arms of Köprülüzade Fazıl Ahmed Pasha.

Köprülüzade Fazıl Ahmed Pasha (Ottoman Turkish: كپرولى زاده فاضل احمد پاشا, Turkish: Köprülü Fazıl Ahmet Paşa; Albanian: Fazlli Ahmed Pashë Kypriljoti; 1635 – 3 November 1676) was an Ottoman-Albanian nobleman and statesman, who belonged to the renowned Köprülü family of Albanian origin, which produced six grand viziers of the Ottoman Empire.

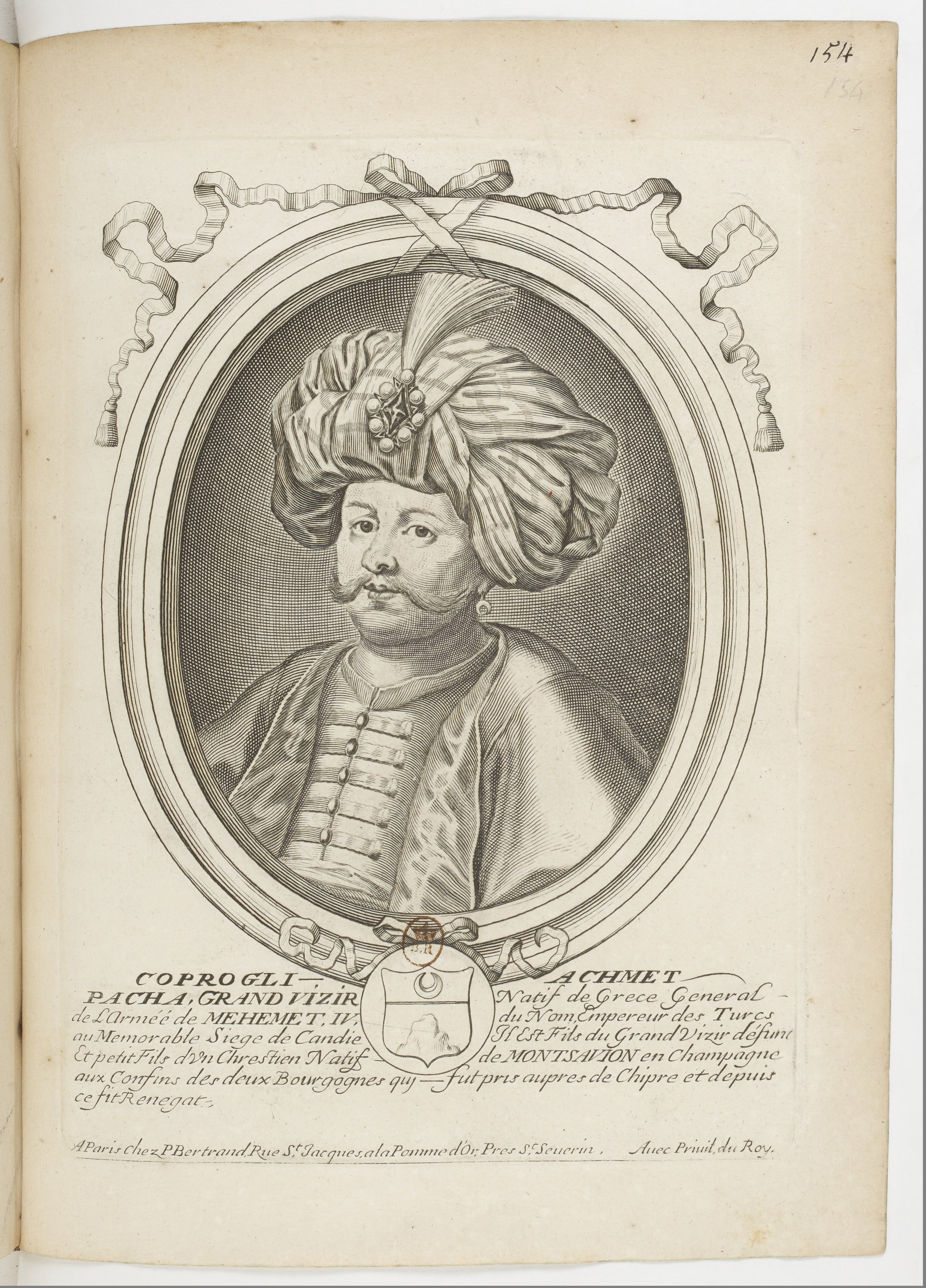
Another engraving of Köprülüzade Fazıl Ahmed Pasha, from 1690

== Life ==
He was born into the Köprülü family, the son of Köprülü Mehmed Pasha and Ayşe Hatun (Hanım), daughter of Yusuf Ağa. His father was an Ottoman general of devshirme origin who in 1656 became Grand Vizier, while his mother was the daughter of a notable originally from Kayacık, a village of Havza in Amasya. His maternal grandfather was a voyvoda (tax-farmer) who built a bridge in Kadegra, that because of this was renamed Köprü, where his father Mehmed was stationed, and to which the Köprülü family owes its name.

He served as grand vizier from 1661 to 1676 after he inherited the title from his father. Prior to this appointment, he served in Ottoman Syria as the Ottoman governor of the Damascus Eyalet (1660 to 1661) and the Erzurum Eyalet (1659 to 1660). According to contemporary foreign sources, Köprülü Mehmed Pasha's wife Ayşe Hanım influenced the appointment of her son, Köprülü Fazıl Ahmed Pasha, as grand vizier.

He was dubbed Fazıl, meaning "wise" (from the Arabic fazilet, meaning "wisdom"), for reducing taxation and promoting education. On the other hand, he was brutal in war. He led the Ottoman Army in the Austro-Turkish War (1663–64) in which he intended to subdue Austria and to finally conquer Vienna itself. At the beginning of July 1664, he succeeded in destroying the fortress of Novi Zrin in the northern part of the Kingdom of Croatia after nearly a month-long siege. Although defeated in the Battle of Saint Gotthard, he was able to gain territory by the Peace of Vasvár in 1664.

Following this treaty, he concentrated on the Cretan War and captured Candia (present-day Heraklion) from the Republic of Venice in 1669. At the end of the Polish–Ottoman War (1672–1676) against the Polish–Lithuanian Commonwealth, he signed the Treaty of Buchach in 1672 and the Treaty of Żurawno in 1676.

Köprülü Fazıl Ahmet Pasha, regarded as one of the most capable Grand Viziers of the Ottoman Empire, did not die in battle. He died from a severe illness on November 3, 1676, at the age of 41. According to historical records, his health began to decline after returning from the military campaign in Poland. While accompanying Sultan Mehmed IV on a journey to Edirne, his condition worsened significantly, preventing him from continuing. He was taken to a nearby location known as the Karabiber farm (Karabiber Çiftliği) near the Ergene River, where he ultimately succumbed to his illness.

Historians attribute his premature death to extreme exhaustion and the immense attrition his body suffered from his relentless work ethic and continuous military leadership. During his 15-year tenure as Grand Vizier, he spent nearly 9 years on active military campaigns. This grueling pace took a heavy toll on his health.

His death was considered a great loss for the Ottoman Empire, as he had secured major victories such as the final conquest of Crete (Candia) and the capture of strategic fortresses like Uyvar (Nové Zámky) and Kamaniçe (Kamianets-Podilskyi). He was succeeded by his brother-in-law, Merzifonlu Kara Mustafa Pasha.

Köprülü Fazıl Ahmet Pasha was a Muslim, adhering to the Sunni Islam sect, which was the official state religion of the Ottoman Empire. The claim suggesting he was an atheist is historically baseless, anachronistic, and impossible within the context of his time and position. Here are the definitive arguments that confirm his religious identity:

The Prerequisite of His Office: The Ottoman Empire was an Islamic Caliphate, and the Sultan held the title of Caliph, the religious leader of Sunni Muslims. The Grand Vizier (Sadrazam) was the Sultan-Caliph's absolute deputy and the head of the government. It was structurally and legally impossible for a non-Muslim to hold this position. The idea of an atheist Grand Vizier would have been as unthinkable as an atheist Pope in the Vatican. His Education and Upbringing: Fazıl Ahmet Pasha received the best possible education for a future statesman of his era, which was fundamentally Islamic. He was trained in madrasas where he studied Islamic sciences, including fiqh (Islamic jurisprudence) and kalam (Islamic theology). His entire worldview and administrative philosophy were shaped by this education. Absence of Any Contradictory Historical Evidence: No credible academic historian or contemporary source has ever claimed that he was anything other than a Muslim. The assertion of atheism is a modern fabrication with no historical evidence to support it. All historical accounts document his life and career as that of a Muslim statesman serving an Islamic empire.

== See also ==
- Köprülü family
- Köprülü era of the Ottoman Empire
- List of Ottoman grand viziers
- List of Ottoman governors of Damascus

Political offices
Preceded by Köprülü Mehmed Pasha	Grand Vizier of the Ottoman Empire; 31 October 1661 – 3 November 1676	Succeeded by Kara Mustafa Pasha
