= Siege of Belgrade (1690) =

Siege of the Great Turkish War

- Part of the Great Turkish War, the Ottoman–Habsburg wars
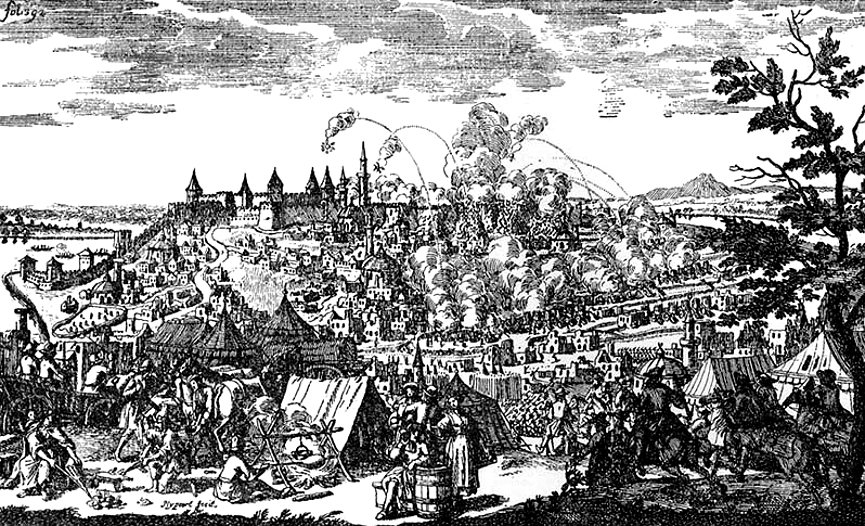
- Siege of Belgrade in 1688 by Nypoort
Date	2–8 October 1690
Location	Belgrade, Ottoman Empire
Result	Ottoman victory
Territorial changes	Ottomans capture Belgrade from the Holy Roman Empire.

Belligerents
Ottoman Empire	Holy Roman Empire

Commanders and leaders
Köprülü Fazıl Mustafa Pasha	(Holy Roman Empire) Ferdinand Gobert von Aspremont-Lynden

The siege of Belgrade in 1690 was the fifth siege of that city, taking place during the Great Turkish War.

Belgrade had been conquered by the Austrians under the elector of Bavaria, Maximilian II Emanuel, on September 6, 1688, after a five-week siege. Only 20 days later, King Louis XIV of France invaded the Rhineland, starting the Nine Years' War. This invasion made the Emperor stop all offensives in the Balkans and redirect the bulk of his army in the East towards the Rhine. This diversion allowed the Ottomans under Grand vizier Köprülü Fazıl Mustafa Pasha to regroup their army and retake the initiative. In 1690, the Ottomans recaptured Niš and by October 2 they had reached Belgrade.

The siege lasted for only six days, as the Austrians were forced to surrender when their main powder magazine was hit by a Turkish shell and exploded. Belgrade was then captured by the Ottomans.

In 1693, Habsburg forces attempted to capture the city again, but failed. The Turks would hold the city until the Austrians retook it in the 1717 siege.

== Sources ==
- Bataković, Dušan T., ed. (2005). Histoire du peuple serbe [History of the Serbian People] (in French). Lausanne: L’Age d’Homme.
- Ćirković, Sima (2004). The Serbs. Malden: Blackwell Publishing.
- Fotić, Aleksandar (2005). "Belgrade: a Muslim and non-Muslim cultural centre (Sixteenth-Seventeenth centuries)". Provincial Elites in the Ottoman Empire: Helcyon Days in Crete V. Rethymno: Crete University Press. pp. 51–75.
- Katić, Tatjana (2018). "Walking through the ravaged City: An Eyewitness Testimony to Demolition of the Belgrade Fortress in 1690". Belgrade: 1521-1867. Belgrade: The Institute of History. pp. 79–99.
