= Köprülü family =

Ottoman political family of Albanian origin

Köprülü
- Noble family
- Country: Ottoman Empire
- Origin: Roshnik, Albania and Vezirköprü, Turkey
- Founded: 1656; 370 years ago
- Founder: Köprülü Mehmed Pasha
- Historic seat: Köprülü Complex
- Titles: Grand Viziers of the Ottoman Empire

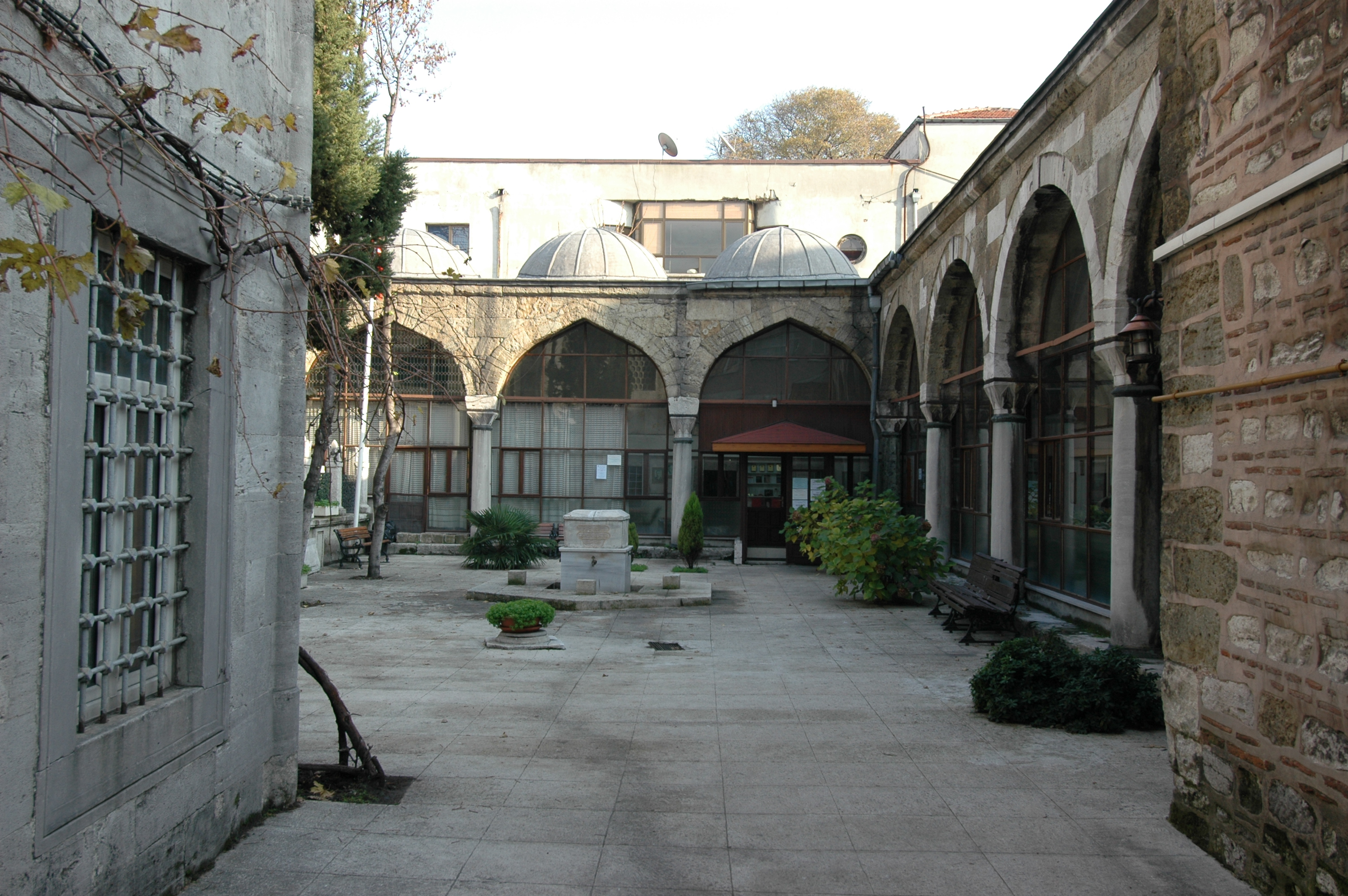
Köprülü Complex courtyard

The Köprülü family (Turkish: Köprülü ailesi, pronounced [ˈcœp.ɾy.ly], Albanian: Kypriljoti or Qypërli) was a noble family of Albanian origin in the Ottoman Empire. The family hailed from the town of Roshnik (near Berat) in the Sanjak of Vlora and provided six Grand Viziers of the Ottoman Empire (including Kara Mustafa Pasha, who was adopted), as well as several other high-ranking officers. The era during which these grand viziers served is known as the Köprülü era of the Ottoman Empire. They were historically the most influential family in the Ottoman Empire after the House of Osman.

Another notable member of the family was Köprülü Abdullah Pasha (1684–1735), who was a general in Ottoman-Persian wars of his time and acted as the governor in several provinces of the empire. Modern descendants include Mehmet Fuat Köprülü, a prominent historian of Turkish literature. Members of the family continue to live in Turkey, the Maghreb, and the United States.

In his novel The Palace of Dreams, Albanian author Ismail Kadare offers a reflection on power, politics, and family dynamics, drawing inspiration from various elements of Ottoman history, including the powerful Köprülü family. The novel explores the intertwining of personal ambition and state affairs, which resonates with the legacy of the Köprülü grand viziers who played a pivotal role in shaping the Ottoman Empire.

== Köprülü grand viziers ==
During the history of the Ottoman Empire, the Köprülü grand viziers had a reputation for dynamism in a state that would later show signs of decline and stagnation. The early viziers in particular focused on military campaigns that extended the Empire's power. This, however, came to an end after the disastrous Battle of Vienna launched by Kara Mustafa Pasha, a member of the family (see also the Treaty of Karlowitz).

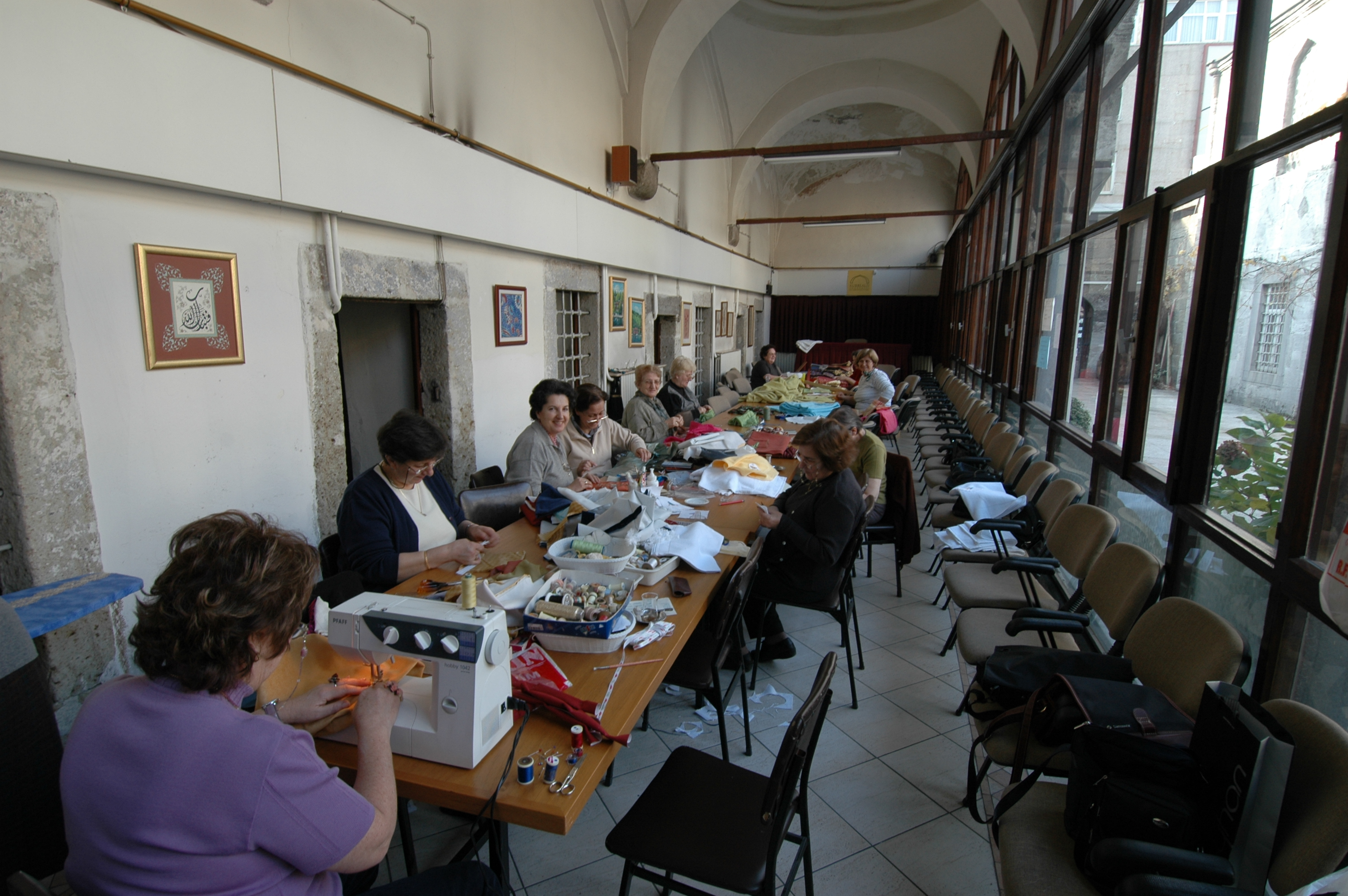
Köprülü Complex corridor

Name	Life	Grand vizier in	Sultans
Köprülü Mehmed Pasha	1583–1661	1656–1661	Mehmed IV
Köprülüzade Fazıl Ahmed Pasha	1635–1676	1661–1676	Mehmed IV
Kara Mustafa Pasha^{1}	1634–1683	1676–1683	Mehmed IV
Abaza Siyavuş Pasha^{2}	died 1688	1687–1688	Suleiman II
Köprülüzade Fazıl Mustafa Pasha	1637–1691	1689–1691	Suleiman II; Ahmed II
Amcazade Köprülü Hüseyin Pasha	1644–1702	1697–1702	Mustafa II
Köprülüzade Numan Pasha	1670–1719	1710–1711	Ahmed III

^{1} Kara Mustafa Pasha had been adopted by the Köprülü family and was the brother-in-law of Köprülü Fazıl Ahmet Pasha.

^{2} Abaza Siyavuş Pasha was a servant of Köprülü Mehmet Pasha. By marrying his daughter, Siyavuş became a son-in-law (damat) of the powerful Köprülü family.

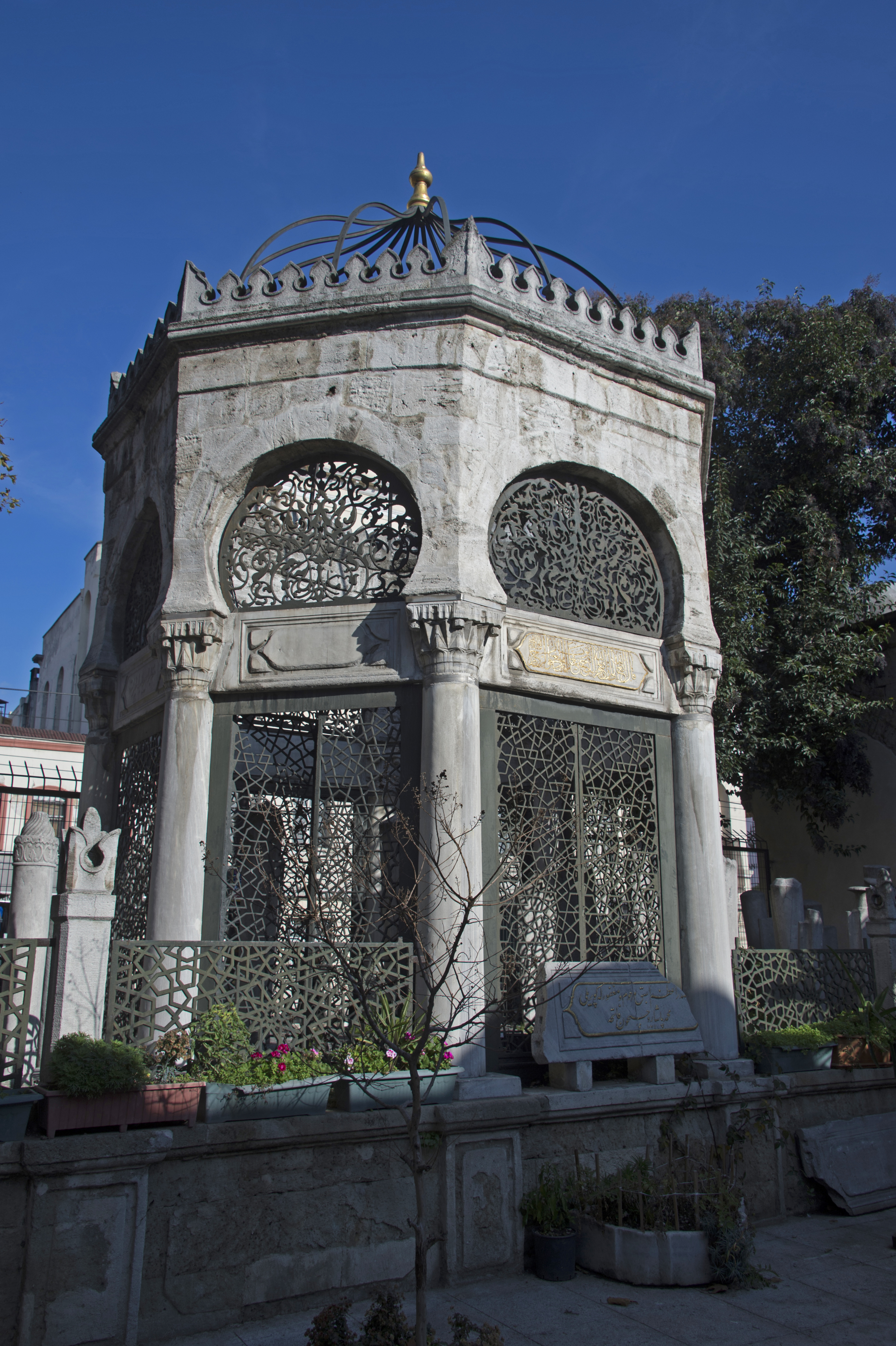
Köprülü Grave

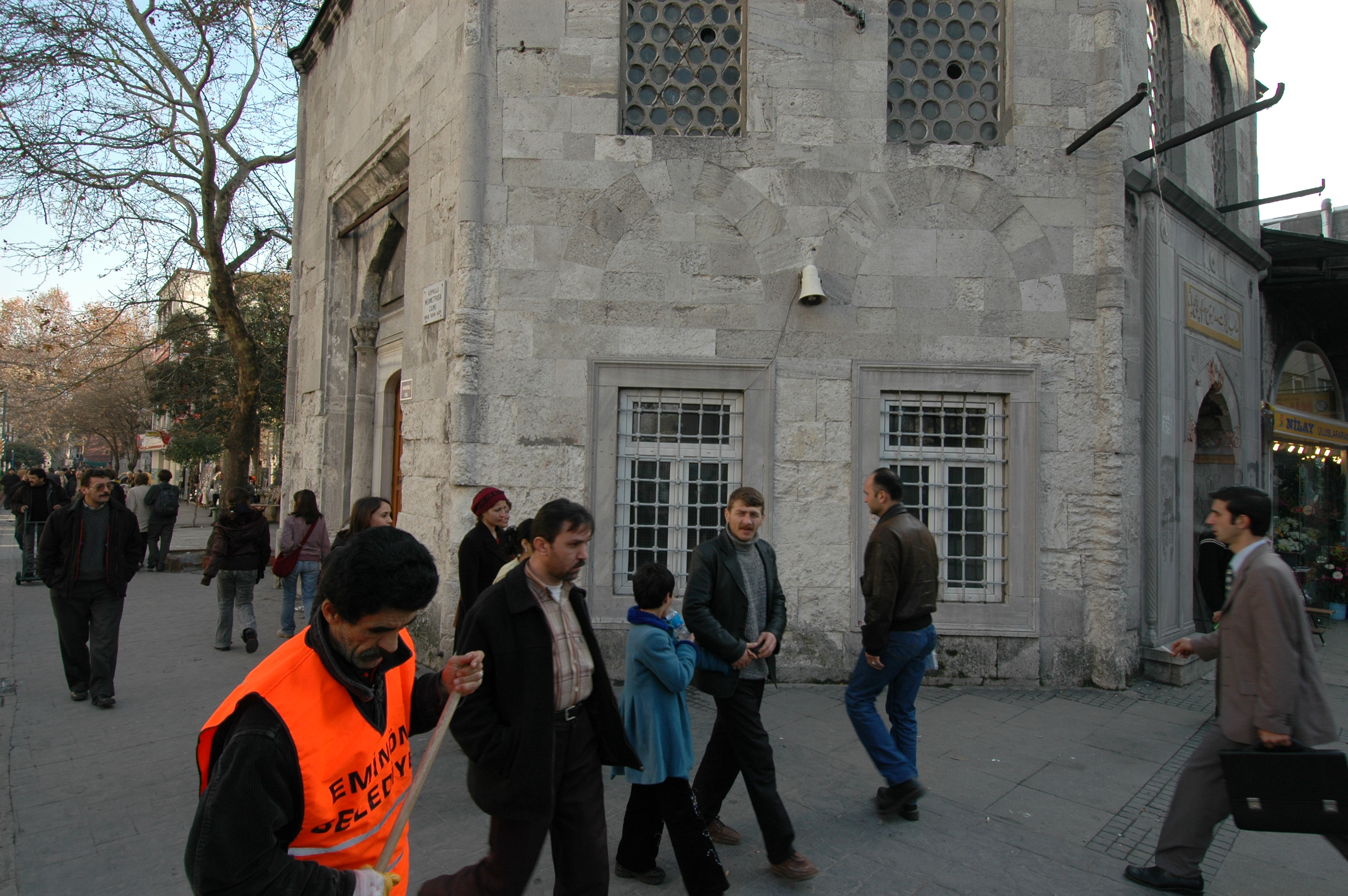
Köprülü mosque

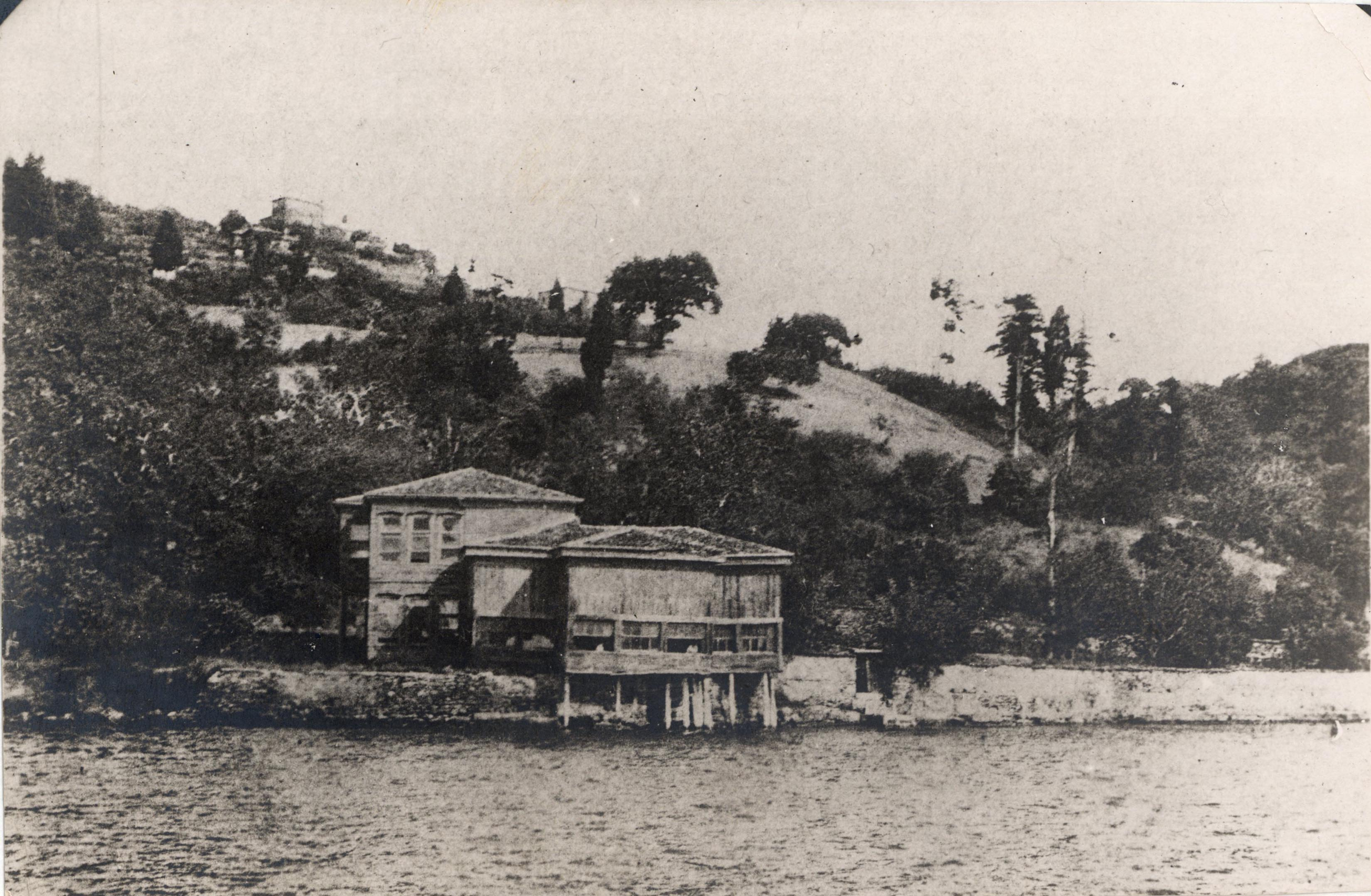
Amcazade (or Köprülü) Yalı

== See also ==
- Köprülü era of the Ottoman Empire
- Veles, a city in North Macedonia (named Köprülü under Ottoman rule)
- Vezirköprü, a Turkish town named after the family
