= Suleiman II (Ottoman sultan) =

Sultan of the Ottoman Empire from 1687 to 1691

- Custodian of the Two Holy Mosques
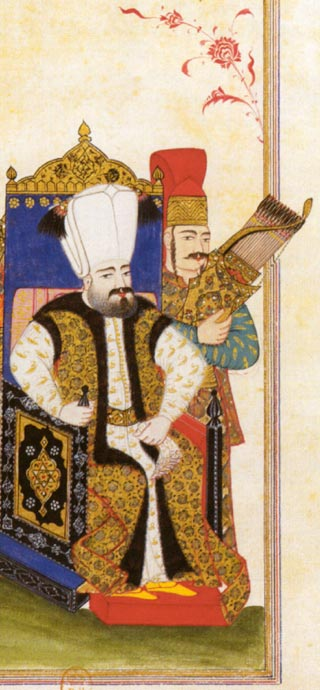
- Portrait from Topkapı family tree

Sultan of the Ottoman Empire (Padishah)
- Reign: 8 November 1687 – 22 June 1691
- Predecessor: Mehmed IV
- Successor: Ahmed II

Ottoman Caliph (Amir al-Mu'minin)
- Predecessor: Mehmed IV
- Successor: Ahmed II
- Born: 15 April 1642; Topkapı Palace, Constantinople, Ottoman Empire
- Died: 22 June 1691 (aged 49); Edirne Palace, Edirne, Ottoman Empire
- Burial: Süleymaniye Mosque, Istanbul, Turkey
- Consorts: Hatice Kadın; Behzad Kadın; İvaz Kadın; Süğlün Kadın; Şehsuvar Kadın; Zeyneb Kadın
Names
- Suleiman bin Ibrahim
- Dynasty: Ottoman
- Father: Ibrahim
- Mother: Saliha Dilaşub Sultan
- Religion: Sunni Islam
- Tughra

Suleiman II (Ottoman Turkish: سليمان ثانى Süleymān-i sānī; Turkish: II. Süleyman; 15 April 1642 – 22 June 1691) was the sultan of the Ottoman Empire from 1687 to 1691. After being brought to the throne by an armed mutiny, Suleiman and his grand vizier Fazıl Mustafa Pasha were successfully able to turn the tide of the War of the Holy League, reconquering Belgrade in 1690, carrying out significant fiscal and military reforms.

== Early life ==
Suleiman II was born on 15 April 1642 at Topkapı Palace in Constantinople, the son of Sultan Ibrahim and Saliha Dilaşub Sultan, whose origins remain unknown, although some sources claim that she was Serbian. Suleiman was only 3 months younger than his half-brother Mehmed IV, who was born on 2 January 1642. After the deposition and execution of his father in 1648, Suleiman's half-brother Mehmed came to the throne. On 21 October 1649, Suleiman along with his brothers Mehmed and Ahmed were circumcised.

In 1651, Suleiman was confined in the Kafes, a luxurious prison for royal princes within Topkapı Palace. This was done to avoid a rebellion. He stayed there for 36 years until he took the throne in 1687.

== Reign ==
Shortly before he assumed the throne, the Ottomans suffered a major defeat at the second Battle of Mohács in 1687. In 1688, Suleiman II urgently requested the Mughal Emperor Aurangzeb for assistance against the rapidly advancing Austrians, during the Ottoman–Habsburg War, but most Mughal forces were engaged in the Deccan Wars and Aurangzeb ignored Suleiman's request to commit to any formal assistance to their desperate Ottoman allies.

The previous ban on alcohol (which was publicly flouted in Istanbul and Galata) was energized under Suleiman, where he managed to demolish several alcohol shops, but this just led to owners bringing in more alcohol.

=== War in the Balkans ===
On 8 September 1688, Belgrade fell to a Habsburg army commanded by Maximilian II Emanuel, Elector of Bavaria, after a siege of nearly a month. The fall of Belgrade opened the road into the Balkans for the Austrians; Bosnia, Transylvania and Walachia all came under Habsburg pressure.

An internal rebellion occurred, led by Yeğen Osman Pasha, a commander of the Anatolian sekban forces and Beylerbey of Rumelia. Rivalries between the janissaries and the sekbans had helped bring Suleiman to power, but the two corps quickly fell out and fresh revolts broke out. In 1688, his forces plundered the treasury of the Serbian Patriarchate of Peć, which had been hidden for safekeeping in Gračanica monastery. According to a contemporary letter by the Catholic bishop Pjetër Bogdani, Yeğen Osman also threatened to behead the Archbishop of Peć and Serbian Patriarch Arsenije III Čarnojević, accusing him of having received Habsburg money to incite an Orthodox Serbian uprising against Ottoman rule. In an attempt to bring him to heel, the sultan appointed Yeğen Osman governor of Belgrade in early 1688. The appointment angered Yeğen Osman because it placed him under the authority of the Ottoman serdar of Hungary, Hasan Pasha. When Habsburg forces besieged Belgrade in the summer of 1688, Yeğen Osman allowed his men to loot the city's bazaars, then withdrew with them southward to Niš

Suleiman II then appointed Köprülü Fazıl Mustafa Pasha as his Grand Vizier in 1689, leading to the reconquest of Belgrade in 1690. Later, the threat from the Russian Empire was renewed when they joined in an alliance with other European powers, while the Ottomans had lost the support of their Crimean vassals, who were forced to defend themselves from several Russian invasions. Under Köprülü's leadership, the Ottomans halted an Austrian advance into Serbia and crushed an uprising in Macedonia and Bulgaria until Köprülü was killed in the Battle of Slankamen by Austrian forces.

=== Death ===
Suleiman II set out at the head of the army in early June 1691, intending to be present for the Hungarian campaign. His health worsened rapidly, fell into a coma and was brought to Edirne on June 8-9, and he died there on 22 June 1691. His body was buried in Suleiman the Magnificent's tomb at Süleymaniye Mosque in Istanbul. His younger half-brother Ahmed II succeeded him as Sultan.

== Family ==
Suleiman II elevated six known concubines to the rank of consort, with the title of Kadin, used for the first time as a title rather than a rank.

He gave them various jewels and precious objects that belonged to Muazzez Sultan, one of her father's Haseki Sultans. These gifts were requisitioned when Ahmed II, son of Muazzez, succeeded Suleiman II on the throne.

The known consorts of Suleiman II were:

- Hatice Kadın. BaşKadin (first consort).
- Behzad Kadın. She received a brooch and a diamond ring that belonged to Muazzez Sultan.
- Süğlün Kadın. She received a pair of pearl earrings, a pair of diamonds earrings and a pendant set with 83 pearls that belonged to Muazzez Sultan.
- Şehsuvar Kadın. She received a pearl-encrusted ablution bowl and a pair of earrings that belonged to Muazzez Sultan.
- Zeyneb Kadın. She received jewelry as gift in 1691.
- İvaz Kadın. She received jewelry as gift in 1691.

Despite his six consorts, Suleiman II remained childless. It is not known whether this was due to his sterility, lack of sexual interest, or his precarious health conditions, which forced him to be bedridden for the final half of his short reign.

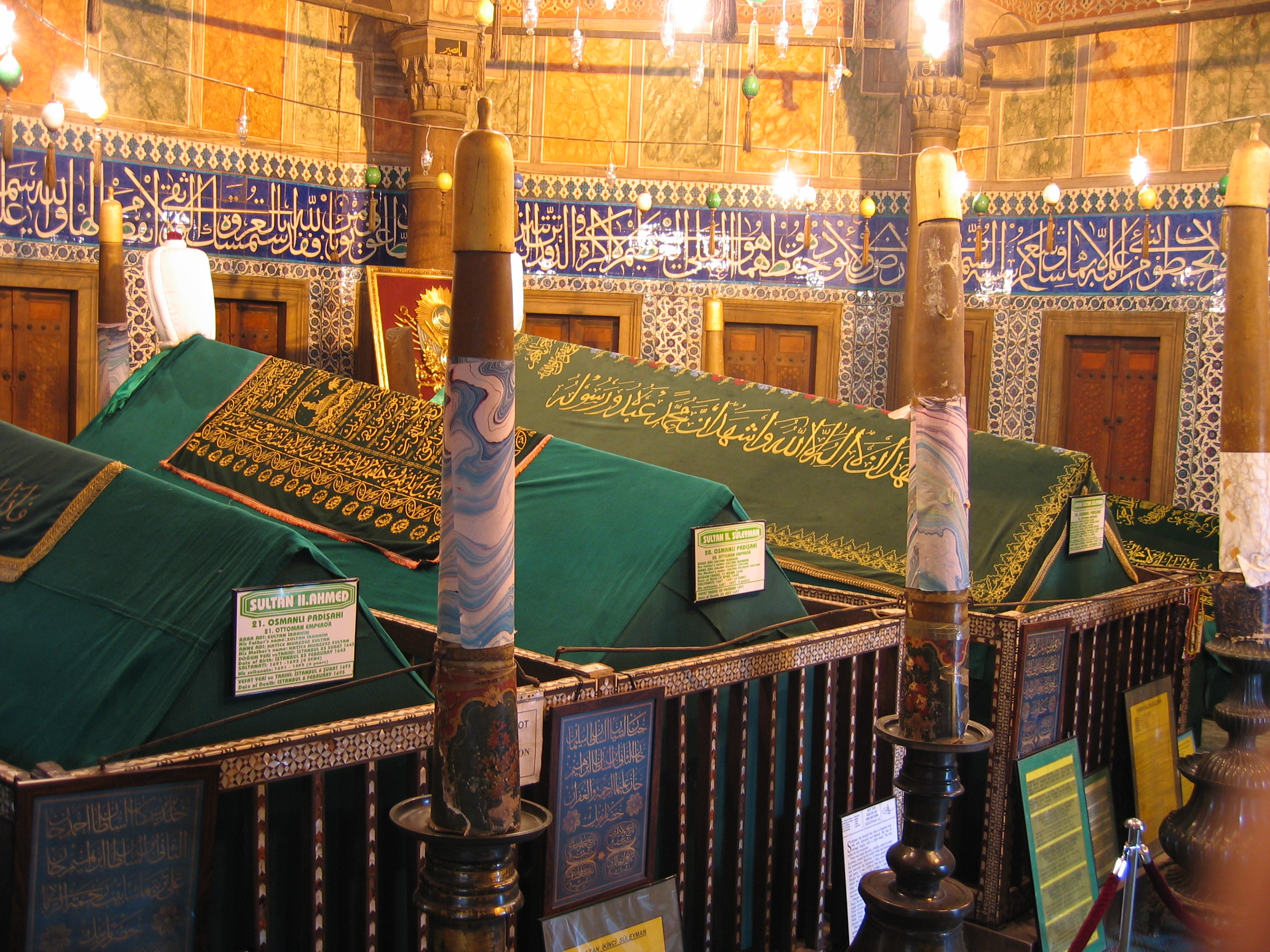
The mausoleum of Suleiman II is located inside the türbe of Suleiman the Magnificent. (In the above picture, his tomb is seen at the center between Ahmed II and Suleiman the Magnificent).

== Gallery ==
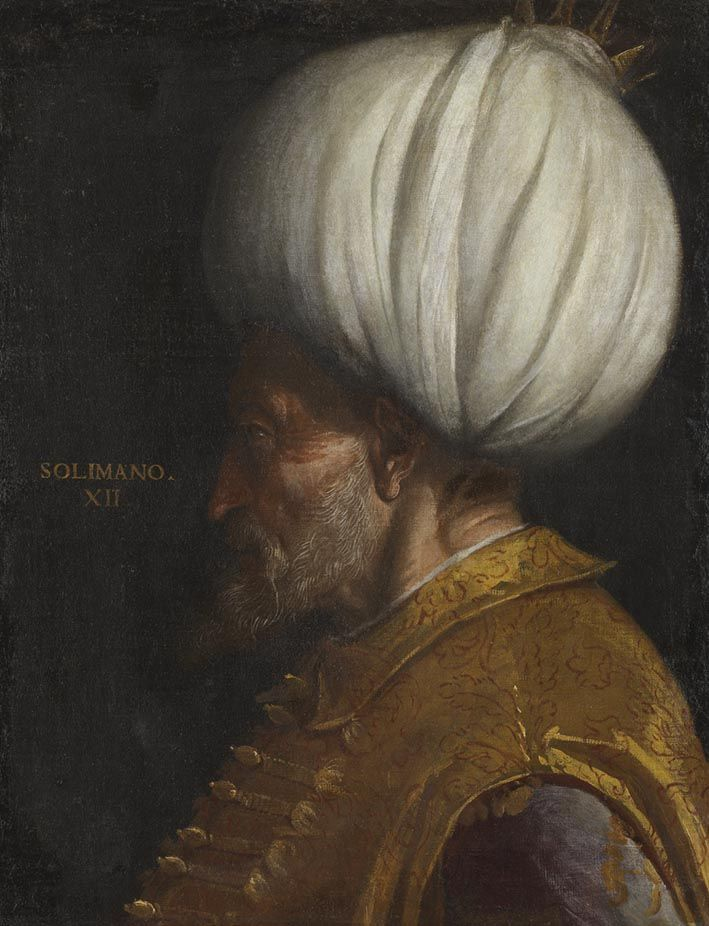
Portrait by an unknown student of Paolo Veronese

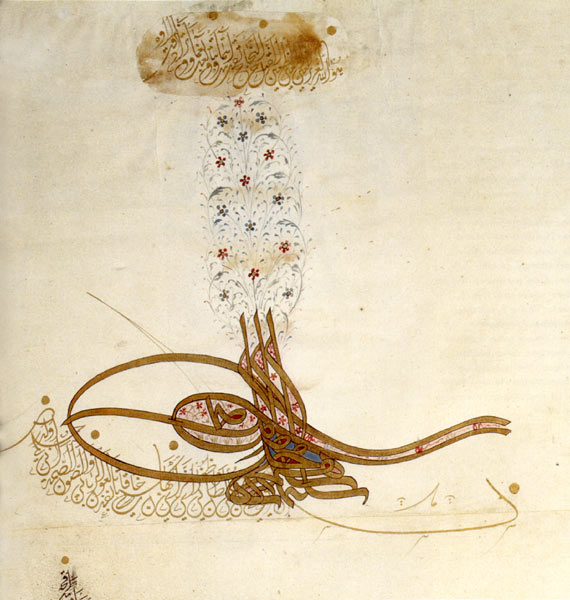
Tughra of Suleiman II

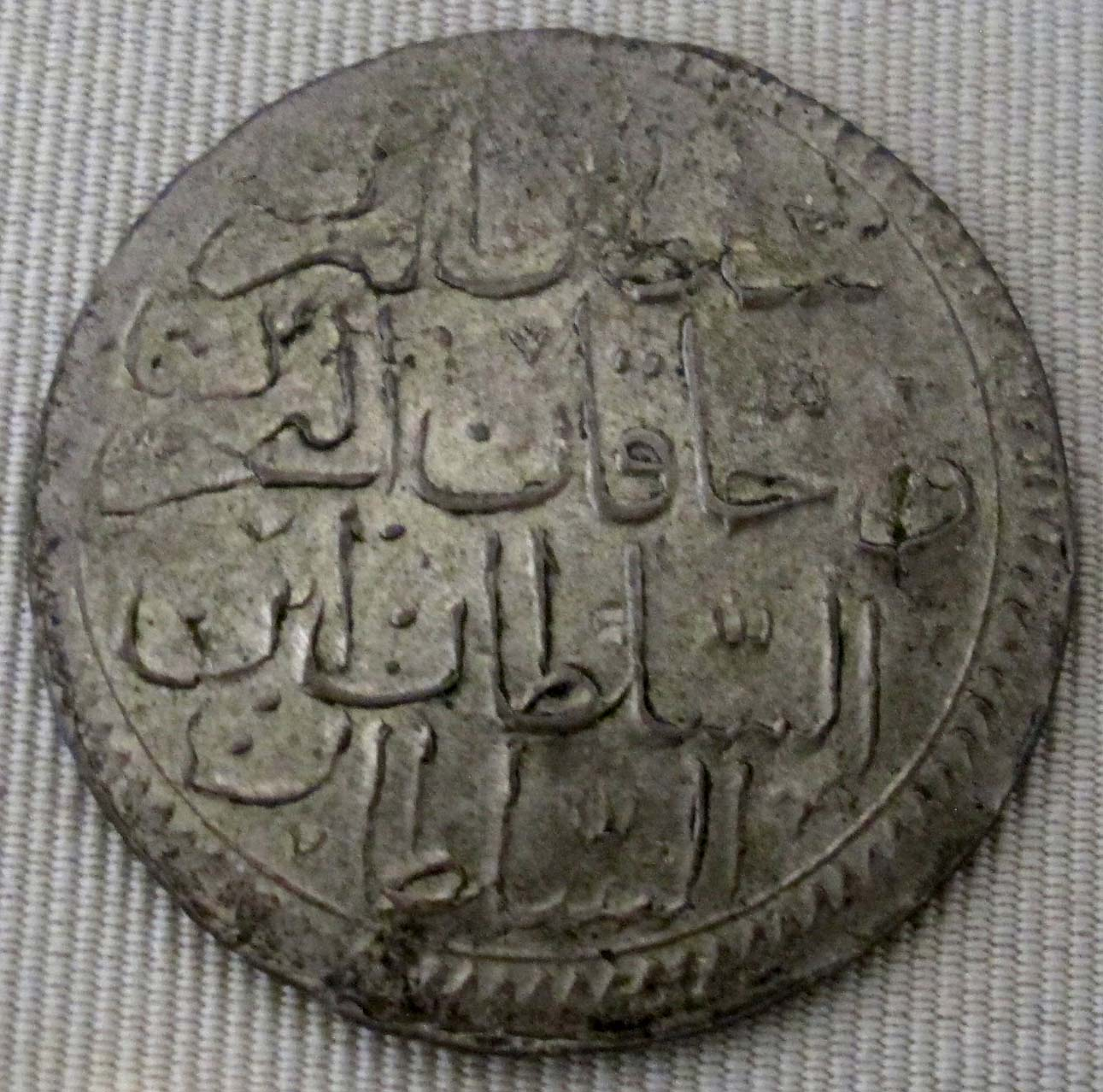
Coin of Suleiman II

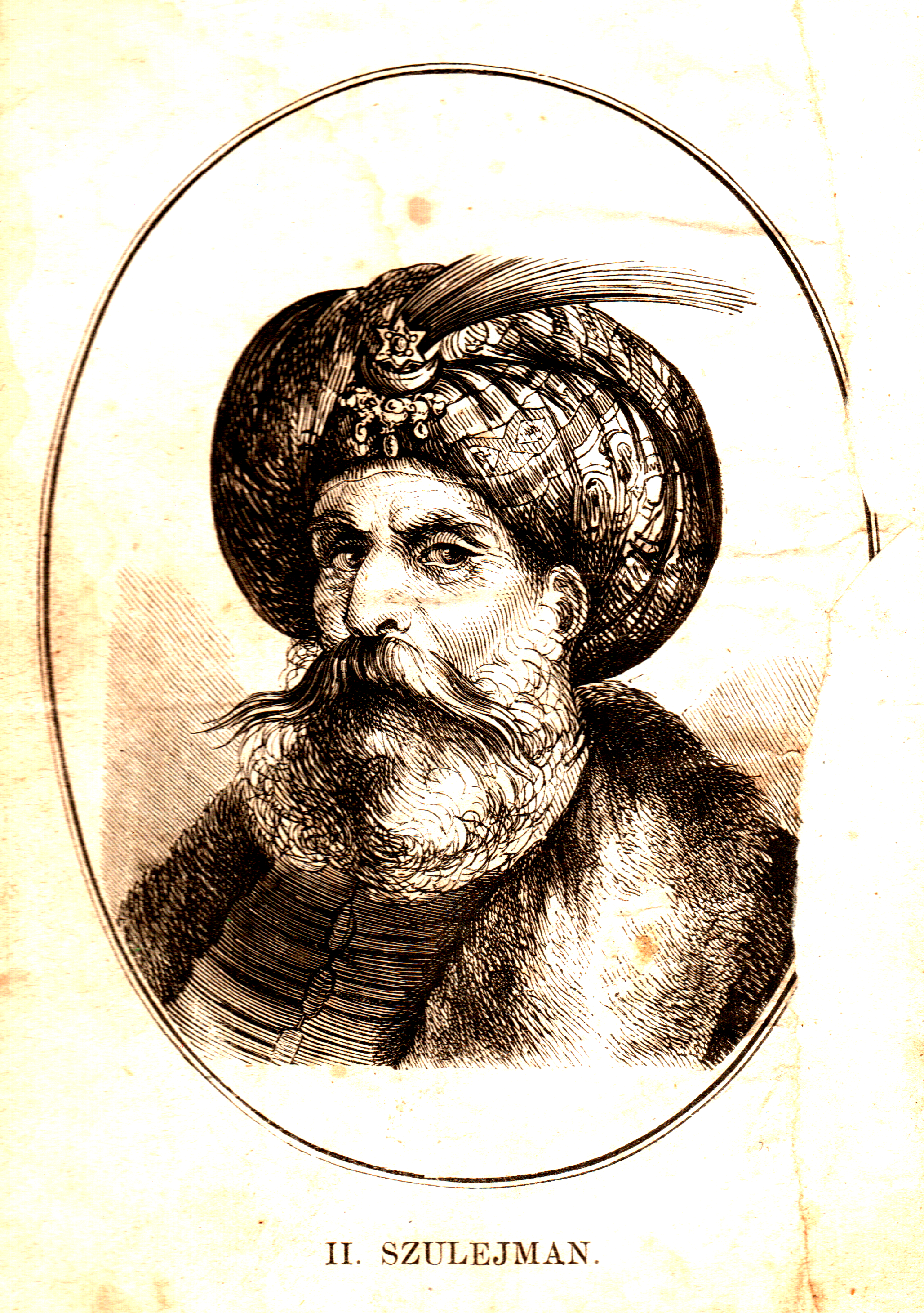
Suleiman II

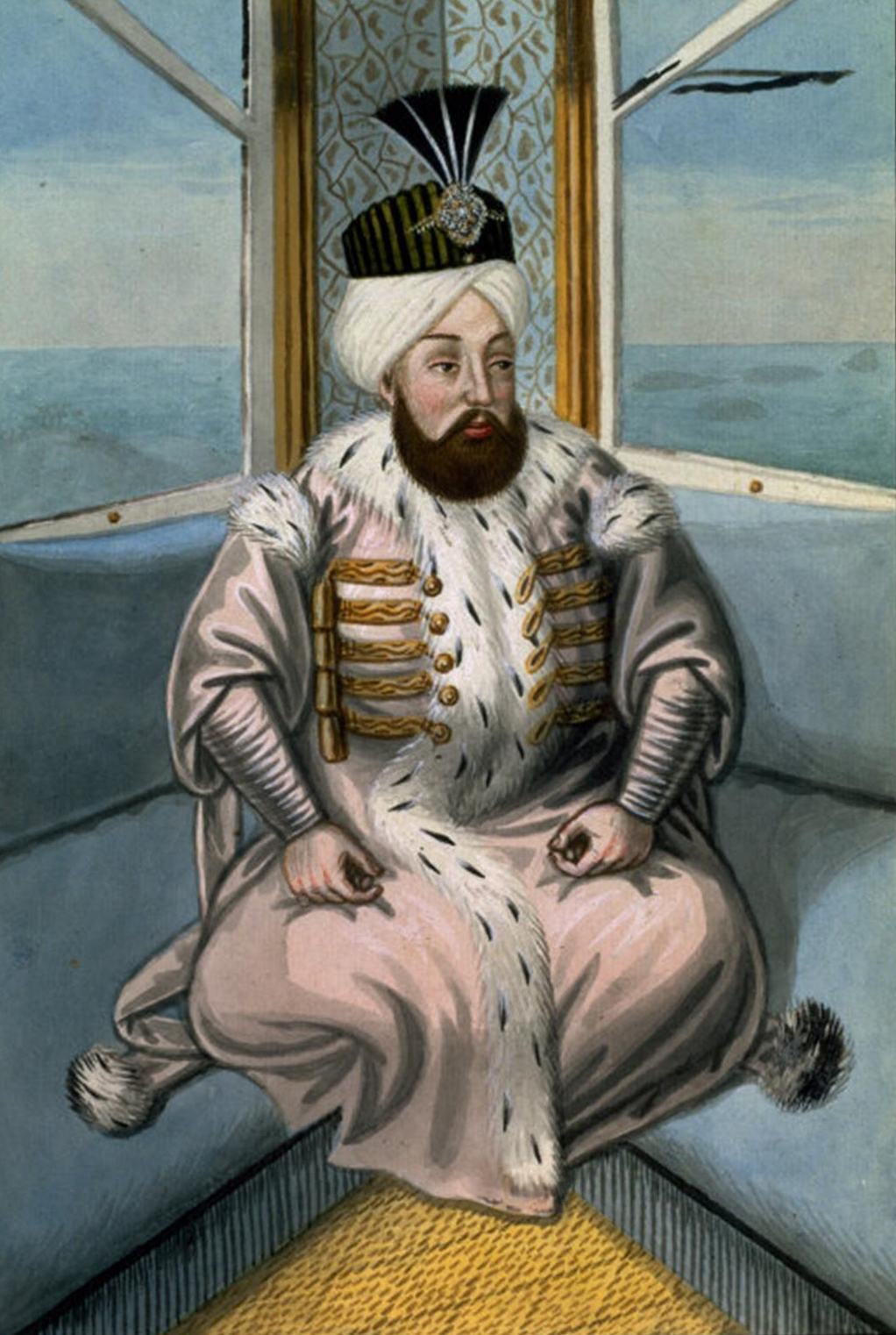
Imaginative portrait by John Young

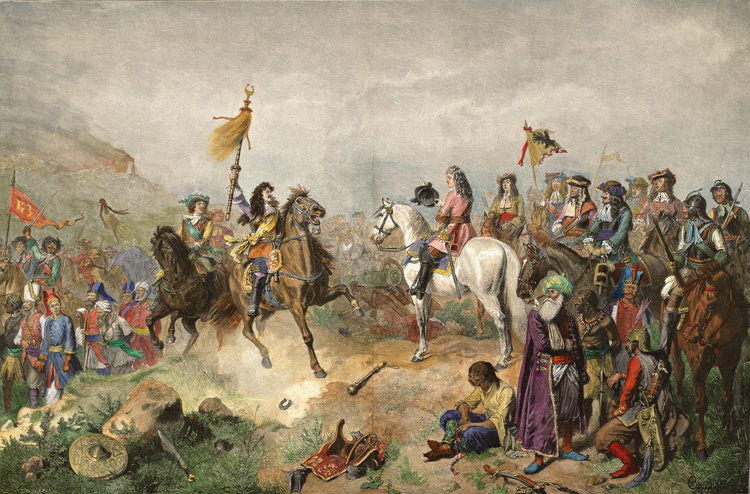
The Ottoman Army after suffering a major defeat during the Second Battle of Mohács

== Bibliography ==
- Sakaoğlu, Necdet (2015). Bu Mülkün Sultanları. Alfa Yayıncılık. ISBN 978-6-051-71080-8.

Suleiman II (Ottoman sultan) House of Osman Born: 15 April 1642 Died: 22 June 1691[aged 49]
Regnal titles
Preceded by Mehmed IV	Sultan of the Ottoman Empire; 8 November 1687 – 22 June 1691	Succeeded by Ahmed II
Sunni Islam titles
Preceded by Mehmed IV	Caliph of the Ottoman Caliphate; 8 November 1687 – 22 June 1691	Succeeded by Ahmed II
