= Köprülüzade Numan Pasha =

Grand Vizier of the Ottoman Empire in 1710

Köprülüzade Numan Pasha (Albanian: Numan Pashë Kjypriljoti, Turkish: Köprülüzade Numan Paşa; 1670–1719) was an Ottoman statesman who was the grand vizier of the Ottoman Empire between June and August 1710. He was a member of the influential Köprülü family, as well as a damat ("bridegroom") to the Ottoman dynasty after marrying Ayşe Sultan, daughter of the Sultan Mustafa II.

When he started his term as grand vizier, Köprülü Numan Pasha had a reputation as an honest, incorruptible, and capable organizer and experienced military leader. He was expected to resolve a highly difficult political situation provoked by king Charles XII of Sweden, who had retreated to Ottoman soil following his defeat in Battle of Poltava 1709. King Charles and his political ally, Crimean Khan Devlet II Giray, persuaded Ottoman sultan Ahmed III to start a war against Peter the Great's Russia. In an effort to avoid joining war, Köprülü Numan Pasha promised a great army to escort king Charles to the Baltic Sea through Poland. However, this plan was seen as dangerous, as it could have meant further problems with Poland and Russia. In addition, being a pious Muslim, he enacted hardline religious actions against Catholics and Orthodox Christians living in the Ottoman capital of Istanbul, causing criticism from abroad.

Unsuccessful in maintaining peace with Russia and stabilizing the political situation in Istanbul, Numan Pasha was removed from his office after only two months and two days. The political situation then led to the Russo-Turkish War of 1710–1711. Despite his unsuccessful term, he continued his job in high civil and military offices. His troops crushed the Austrian army in Bosnia after Austria had conquered Belgrade in 1717, such as at the Siege of İzvornik. Following his victory, he was installed in Crete as governor on his own request, but fell ill as soon as he arrived on the island. He died in Heraklion 1719.

Moldavian voivode Dimitrie Cantemir, who had rebelled against the Ottoman rule in 1711 and was exiled to Russia being on the losing side (as an ally of the Russians) of the Russo-Turkish War, wrote an amusing although not very reliable anecdote of his enemy Numan Pasha in his history, which led to his resolution to switch sides during the war. According to Cantemir, Numan Pasha was bookish and pale of skin, also not of sound mind; his time in office was noted for an incident where he was insistent that there was always a fly that had landed upon his nose. He was only cured when during an examination, when a French physician fed him juleps (lying that it was for medicinal purposes) and pretended to agree with him. The physician produced a knife and cut off the imaginary fly, and then showed Numan Pasha a dead one that was already hidden in his hand. A similar story was told earlier by Samuel Butler in his satirical poem Hudibras.

== See also ==
- Köprülü era of the Ottoman Empire
- Köprülü family
- List of Ottoman grand viziers
- List of Ottoman governors of Crete

== Notes ==
Political offices
Preceded by Çorlulu Ali Pasha	Grand Vizier of the Ottoman Empire; 16 June 1710 – 17 August 1710	Succeeded by Baltacı Mehmet Pasha
