= Ebezâde Abdullah Efendi =

Ottoman Shaykh al-Islām

Shaykh al-Islām of the Ottoman Empire
- In office 25 January 1708 – 16 July 1710
- Preceded by: Sadreddinzade Sadık Mehmed Efendi
- Succeeded by: Paşmakçızade Seyit Ali Efendi

Shaykh al-Islām of the Ottoman Empire
- In office 13 February 1712 – 14 March 1713
- Preceded by: Paşmakçızade Seyit Ali Efendi
- Succeeded by: Mehmed Ataullah Efendi

Personal details
- Died: 1714 Off the coast of Karasu, Ottoman Empire
- Profession: Islamic scholar

Ebezâde Abdullah Efendi (died 1714) was a notable Ottoman Islamic scholar who served twice as Shaykh al-Islām, the highest religious authority in the empire.

== Biography ==
Abdullah Efendi was the son of Kadı Mustafa Efendi. His epithet "Ebezâde" ("son of the midwife") derives from his mother's service as midwife to one of Sultan Mehmed IV's children during the Polish campaign at the town of Balçık.

He was first appointed Shaykh al-Islām on 25 January 1708, succeeding Sadreddinzade Sadık Mehmed Efendi, and served until his dismissal on 16 July 1710. After the death of his successor Paşmakçızade Seyit Ali Efendi, Abdullah Efendi was reappointed on 13 February 1712 and remained in office until 14 March 1713, when he was replaced by Mehmed Ataullah Efendi.

In 1714, following his removal, he was exiled to Trabzon. While en route to the Black Sea port, the ship he boarded sank in a storm off the coast of Karasu, and he drowned.

== Legacy ==
In the Atikali neighbourhood of Fatih, there stands the Ebezâde Abdullah Efendi Fountain, dated AH 1135—which corresponds to 1722–23 CE—erected in his memory.
