= Atskuri (Akhaltsikhe Municipality) =

Atskuri აწყური
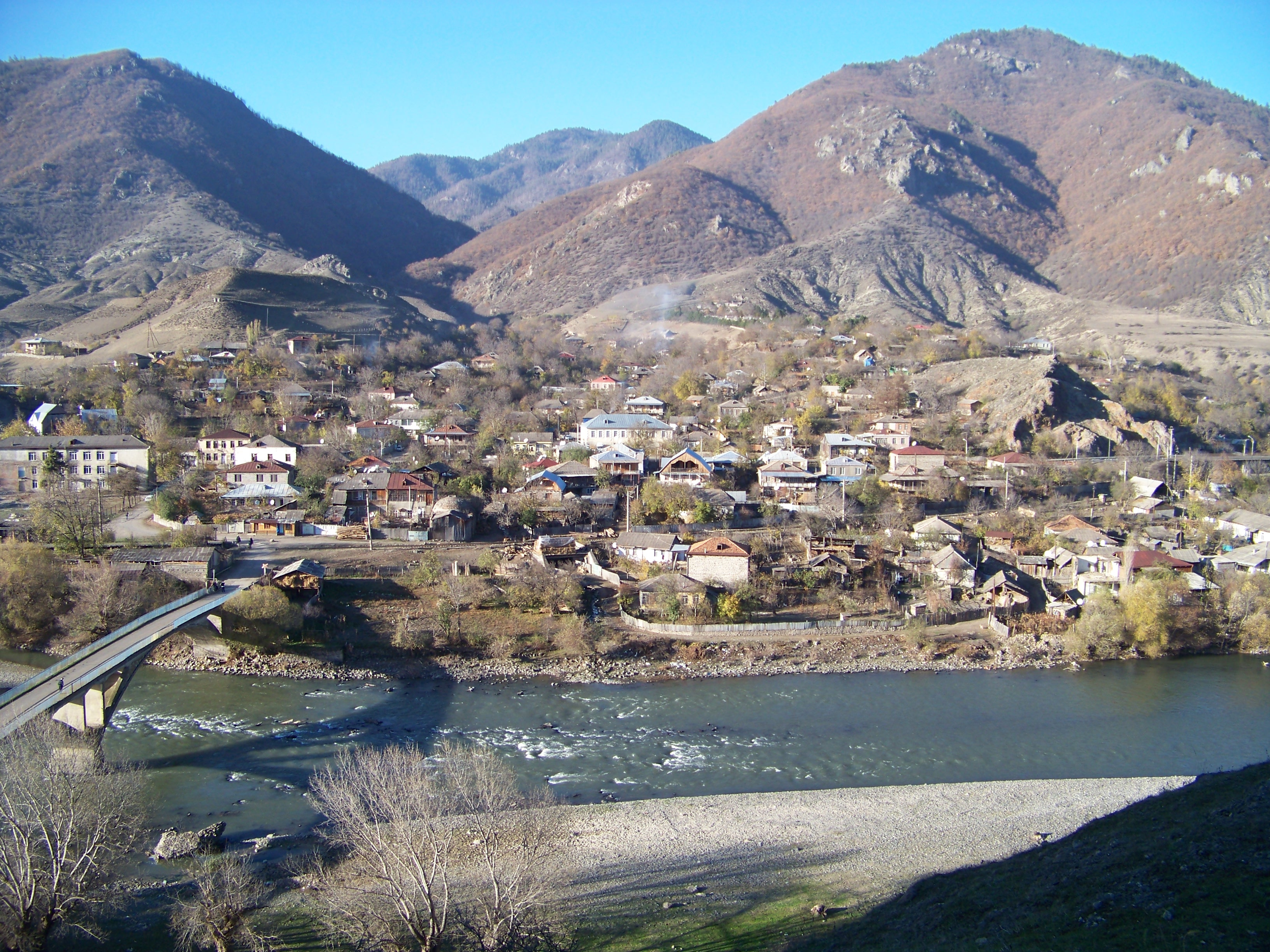
- Village view of Atskuri

- Location within Georgia
- Coordinates: 41°43′45″N 43°09′34″E
- Country: Georgia
- Mkhare: Samtskhe–Javakheti
- Municipality: Akhaltsikhe Municipality

Population (2014)
  - Total: 1,539
- Time zone: UTC+4 (Georgian Time)

Atskuri (Georgian: აწყური) is a village in Akhaltsikhe Municipality, Samtskhe–Javakheti region, Georgia. It is the center of a local community that also includes the villages of Tiseli and Tkemlana.

The village is located on the banks of the Mtkvari River, near the confluence with the Abanoskhevi River, at an elevation of 900 metres above sea level and approximately 22 km from Akhaltsikhe. The local economy is based on animal husbandry and fruit growing. The village has a public school, culture house, library, and pharmacy. In the Middle Ages, Atskuri was a town.

== Demographics ==
According to the 2014 census, Atskuri had a population of 1,539.

| Census year | Population | Men | Women |
|---|---|---|---|
| 2002 | 1,984 | 945 | 1,039 |
| 2014 | 1,539 | 760 | 779 |

== Etymology ==
The name Atskuri is derived from the Georgian root *tsq* (water), found in words such as *tsqali* (water) and *tsqaro* (spring). The toponym is generally interpreted as meaning “a watery place” or “place of water”.

== History ==
Atskuri is one of the oldest settlements in Georgia. Its earlier name was Sosangeti, and it is also mentioned in historical sources as Atskveri. It is first recorded in the 11th century. According to Georgian chronicles, a church was built here during the campaign of Byzantine Emperor Heraclius in the 7th century.

In the early feudal period, Atskuri was an important political center of Samtskhe and the seat of the Samdzivari noble family. It remained significant during the existence of the Samtskhe–Atabegate. Several Georgian scribes and clerics worked in Atskuri, including Giorgi Matskvereli (9th–10th century), Gabriel Kotai (11th century), Ioakime Matskvereli (16th century), and Ieremia Matskvereli (16th century).

In the second half of the 16th century, Atskuri was occupied by the Ottoman Empire.

In the 18th century, it was a small town with customs posts. Following the Treaty of Adrianople (1829), it was transferred to the Russian Empire and incorporated into the Akhaltsikhe district.

During the 19th century, the population changed significantly due to migration. Armenian settlers arrived in 1830, while many local Georgian Muslims and Jewish residents later emigrated.

== Diocese ==
Atskuri was an important episcopal centre. The Atskuri Diocese was one of the oldest dioceses in Georgia. Its bishops were known by the title Matskvereli (Georgian: მაწყვერელი). The earliest bishop whose name has survived in historical sources was Ioseb (Joseph), who was active in the early 6th century. The last bishop whose name is known was Gedeon, who received his appointment to the see of Atskuri from the Ottoman sultan.

According to The Life of Gregory of Khandzta, an episcopal church at Atskuri already existed during the lifetime of Gregory of Khandzta, in the 8th–9th centuries. Between the 12th and 16th centuries, it became an important ecclesiastical centre of Samtskhe.

Among the bishops of Atskuri, Ephrem the Great Matskvereli (855–895), a disciple of Gregory of Khandzta, was particularly distinguished. The historian Giorgi Merchule wrote about him:

Ephrem the Great became the author of many good deeds in our country, for previously the holy chrism was brought from Jerusalem by the Catholicoi of the East, whereas, by the command of Christ and with the authorisation and approval of the Patriarch of Jerusalem, Ephrem established the consecration of the chrism in Kartli.

— Giorgi Merchule, The Life of Gregory of Khandzta. Tbilisi, 1949, p. 97.

During the Middle Ages, the Atskuri Diocese occupied a prominent position within the ecclesiastical hierarchy of Georgia. According to the ceremonial regulations known as Gangoba Darbazobisa, the Matskvereli ranked third among the hierarchs of the Catholicosate of Kartli, after the Metropolitan of Greater Armenia and the Archbishop of Kartli. In the 15th–16th centuries, the influence of the Matskvereli increased further as a result of the policy pursued by the atabegs of Samtskhe to establish greater ecclesiastical autonomy. According to a document dating from the first half of the 16th century, the Matskvereli ranked first among the thirteen hierarchs of Meskheti and was the only one entitled to wear a mitre and a sakkos. During this period, the bishop held the title of Mts'delmtavartm'tavari-Mtavarepiskoposi (Chief of Hierarchs and Archbishop).

In the early 16th century, Mzechabuk Jaqeli, the atabeg of Samtskhe, attempted to secure the independence of the local ecclesiastical hierarchy from the Catholicosate of Mtskheta. Simon, appointed Matskvereli in 1486, who had previously served as Bishop of Tbeti, played an important role in this process. In 1508–1509, Mzechabuk endowed the Atskuri Diocese with estates, villages and peasants. Later, a charter issued by Patriarch Dorotheos III of Antioch between 1510 and 1516 granted the Matskvereli the right to consecrate the bishops of Samtskhe independently of Mtskheta. This arrangement did not last long. A document of allegiance issued by Manuchar Atabeg and dated to 1517–1520 once again recognised the authority of the Catholicos of Kartli to consecrate the Matskvereli and the other bishops of Samtskhe.

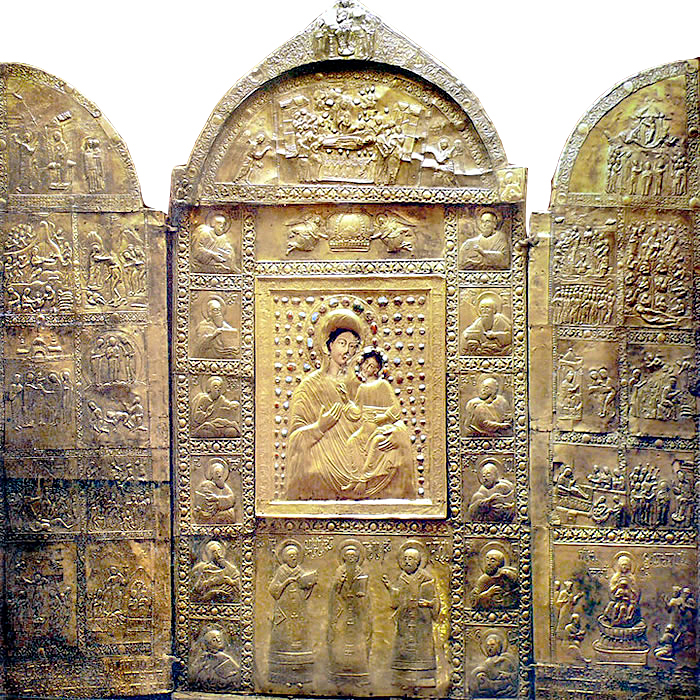
Atskuri Icon of the Virgin Mary

Despite the establishment of Ottoman rule over Samtskhe in the 16th century, the Atskuri Diocese continued to exist. Its bishops during this period included Manoel Chkhetidze (1535–1541), Ioakime (1541), Christopher (1543), Anton (1540s), Ieremia (1575) and Serapion Khurtsidze (1577). Because of his opposition to Ottoman rule, Bishop Anton left Samtskhe and moved to Imereti, where King Bagrat III of Imereti appointed him Bishop of Gelati. The continued existence of the Atskuri Diocese in the second half of the 16th century is confirmed by a document dating to around 1575, which mentions Bishop Ieremia, as well as by an inscription on the bell tower of Zarzma Monastery, which refers to Serapion Khurtsidze as Matsqvereli in 1577.

Following the establishment of Ottoman rule, the appointment of bishops to the Atskuri see came under the authority of the Ottoman sultan. An important piece of evidence is a firman issued by Sultan Mehmed IV in 1649 concerning the appointment of Ioane the Monk as Matsqvereli. According to the document, Ioane the Monk petitioned the divan of Erzurum, requesting confirmation of his appointment to the vacant episcopal see of Atskuri. The sultan granted his request and ordered that Ioane assume the position of Matsqvereli in the Pashalik of Akhaltsikhe. The authorities were also prohibited from interfering in his activities. The firman confirms that, by the mid-17th century, the Ottoman administration officially recognised the existence of the Atskuri Diocese. However, the document does not indicate where Ioane was consecrated as a bishop or what relationship he maintained with the Catholicos of Kartli.

In 1650, Gedeon Saparidze received the episcopal see of Atskuri. He had previously served as Bishop of Tbeti since 1637. A historical marginal note in manuscript S-252გ, preserved at the National Centre of Manuscripts of Georgia, states: "Here, Saparidze, Bishop of Tbeti, received the bishoprics of Ishkhani and Matsqvereli from the Sultan." Thus, with the approval of the Ottoman sultan, Gedeon Saparidze simultaneously united three episcopal sees: Tbeti, Ishkhani and Atskuri. According to Goderdzi Bolkvadze, by the 17th century only three of the thirteen episcopal sees of Samtskhe had probably survived, all administered by a single bishop. Gedeon's tenure as Matsqvereli is believed to have continued until approximately 1667.

During Ottoman rule, the Christian ecclesiastical organisation of Samtskhe gradually weakened. According to the Georgian historian and geographer Vakhushti Batonishvili, traditional ecclesiastical administration in the region was disrupted, churches and monasteries were destroyed, and mosques were built in their place. Some of the Christian population migrated to Kartli and Imereti, taking church relics with them. As a result of these developments, the Atskuri Diocese appears to have ceased functioning by the 18th century, although the exact date of its abolition is unknown.

A letter written in Akhaltsikhe on 13 August 1764 mentions a bishop named Giorgi, who had previously been Orthodox but, according to the author of the letter, subsequently converted to Catholicism. As a result, he encountered difficulties with the local authorities. Historian Shota Lomsadze suggested that Giorgi may have been the bishop of either Atskuri or Sapara. Goderdzi Bolkvadze considers him the last known hierarch associated with the history of the Atskuri Diocese, although his identification as a Matskvereli has not been confirmed.

=== List of bishops of Atskuri ===
6th century

- Ioseb (Joseph) – Bishop of Atskuri (recorded in 506).

9th century

- Ephrem the Great – Bishop (855–895).

Late 9th–early 10th century

- Giorgi Matsqvereli – Bishop.

Late 10th–early 11th century

- Ioane Mtbevari – Bishop of Tbeti and Atskuri (995–1003).

11th century

- Arseni (Jaqeli) – Bishop (1040s–1050s).

12th century

- Mikhaeli (son of Miriani) – Matsqvereli; later Catholicos of Kartli (1178–1187).

Late 12th–early 13th century

- Melkisedek – Matsqvereli (c. 1200).

13th century

- Ioane – Matsqvereli (1241).
- Nikoloz (son of Juansher) – Matsqvereli (1270s–1280s).

Late 13th–early 14th century

- Grigol – Archbishop.

14th century

- Nikoloz – Archbishop (1340s–1360s).
- Pimen – Archbishop (late 14th century).

15th century

- Gerasime – Archbishop (1410s–1420s).
- Serapion – Archbishop (1427–1438).
- Shio – Bishop (until 1467).
- Ioane – Bishop (from 1467).
- Grigol – Matsqvereli (1473).
- Unknown Matsqvereli – expelled by Qvarqvare II Jaqeli in 1486.

Late 15th–early 16th century

- Simon – Chief Hierarch and Archbishop (1486–probably before 1515).

16th century

- Manoel (Chkhetidze) – Archbishop (1535–1541).
- Ioakime – Hierarch and Archbishop (1541).
- Christopher – Matsqvereli (1543).
- Anton – Matsqvereli (1540s).
- Ieremia – Chief Hierarch (1575).
- Serapion Khurtsidze – Chief Hierarch (1577).

17th century

- Ioane the Monk – Matsqvereli (1649–1650).
- Gedeon Saparidze – Bishop of Tbeti, Ishkhani and Atskuri (1650–probably until 1667).

18th century

- Giorgi – Bishop (before 1764; possibly Matsqvereli).

== Landmarks ==
The village preserves the Virgin Mary domed church, with construction phases dating to the 10th–11th and 13th–14th centuries. The renovation of its ruins began in 2015. The structure was once one of the largest churches in Georgia. The area also includes Atskuri Fortress and Slesa Fortress, and there are several small chapels within the village territory.

== Gallery ==
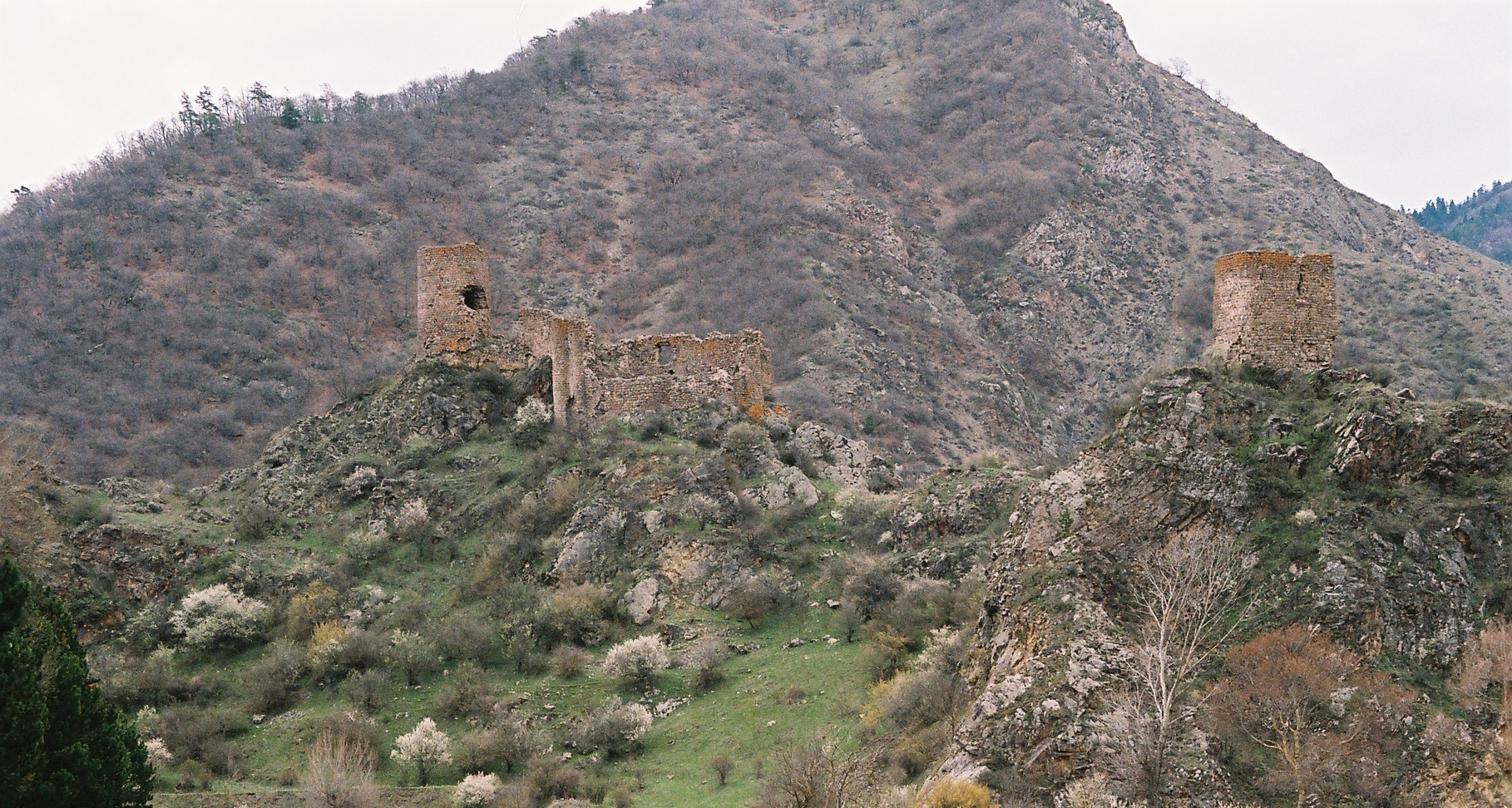
Slesa Fortress

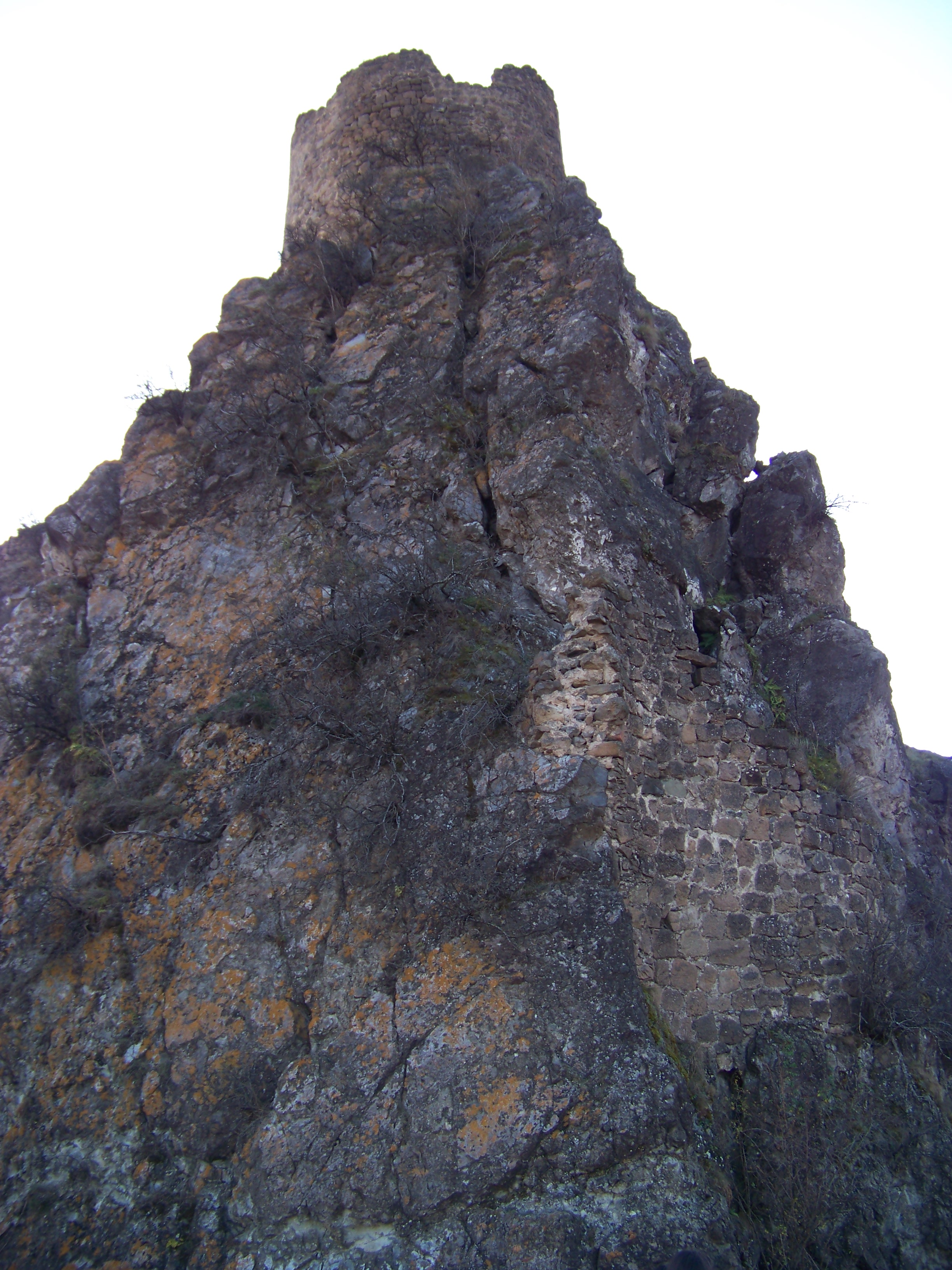
Atskuri Fortress (north-east view)

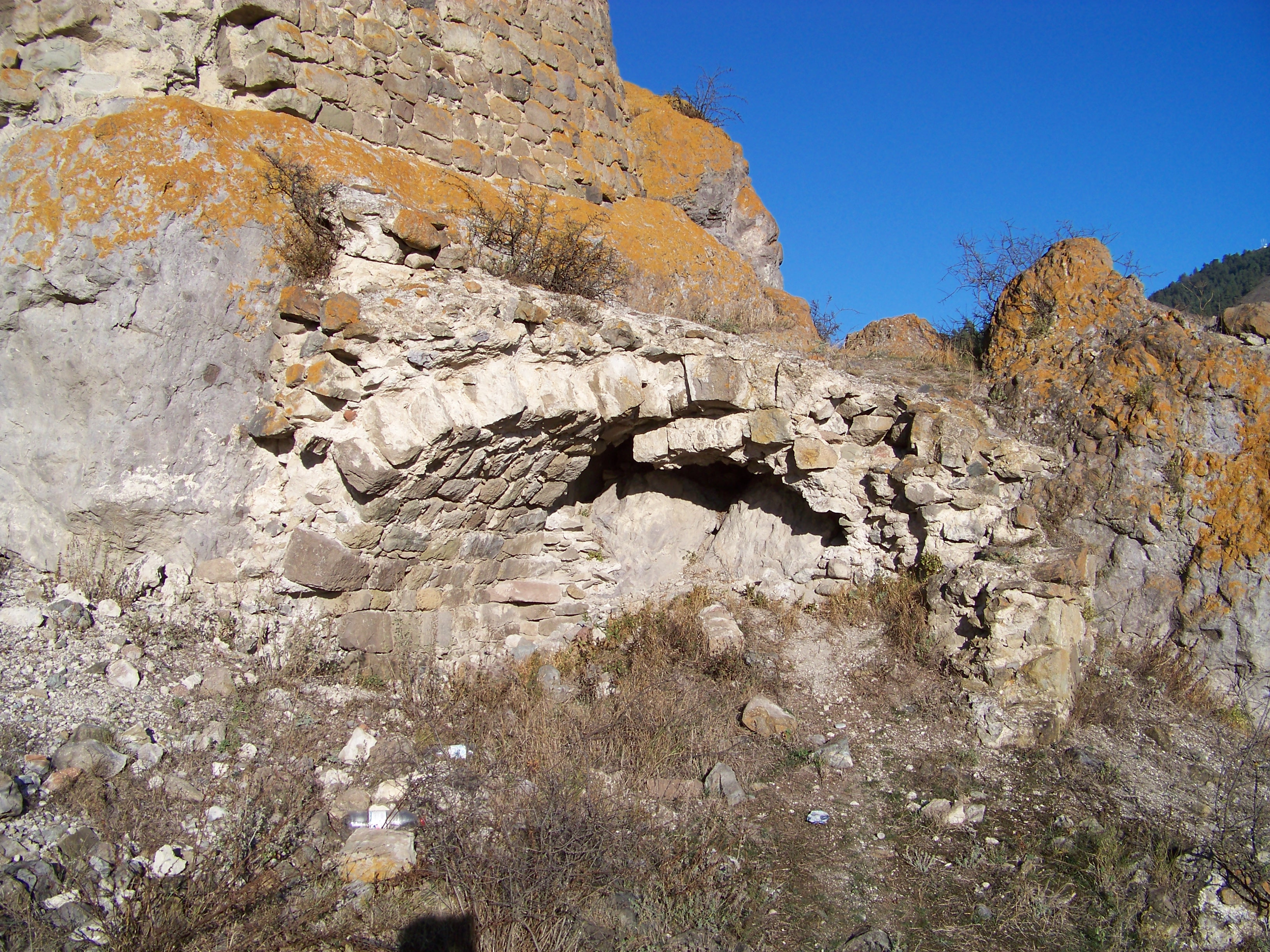
Church ruins inside the fortress walls

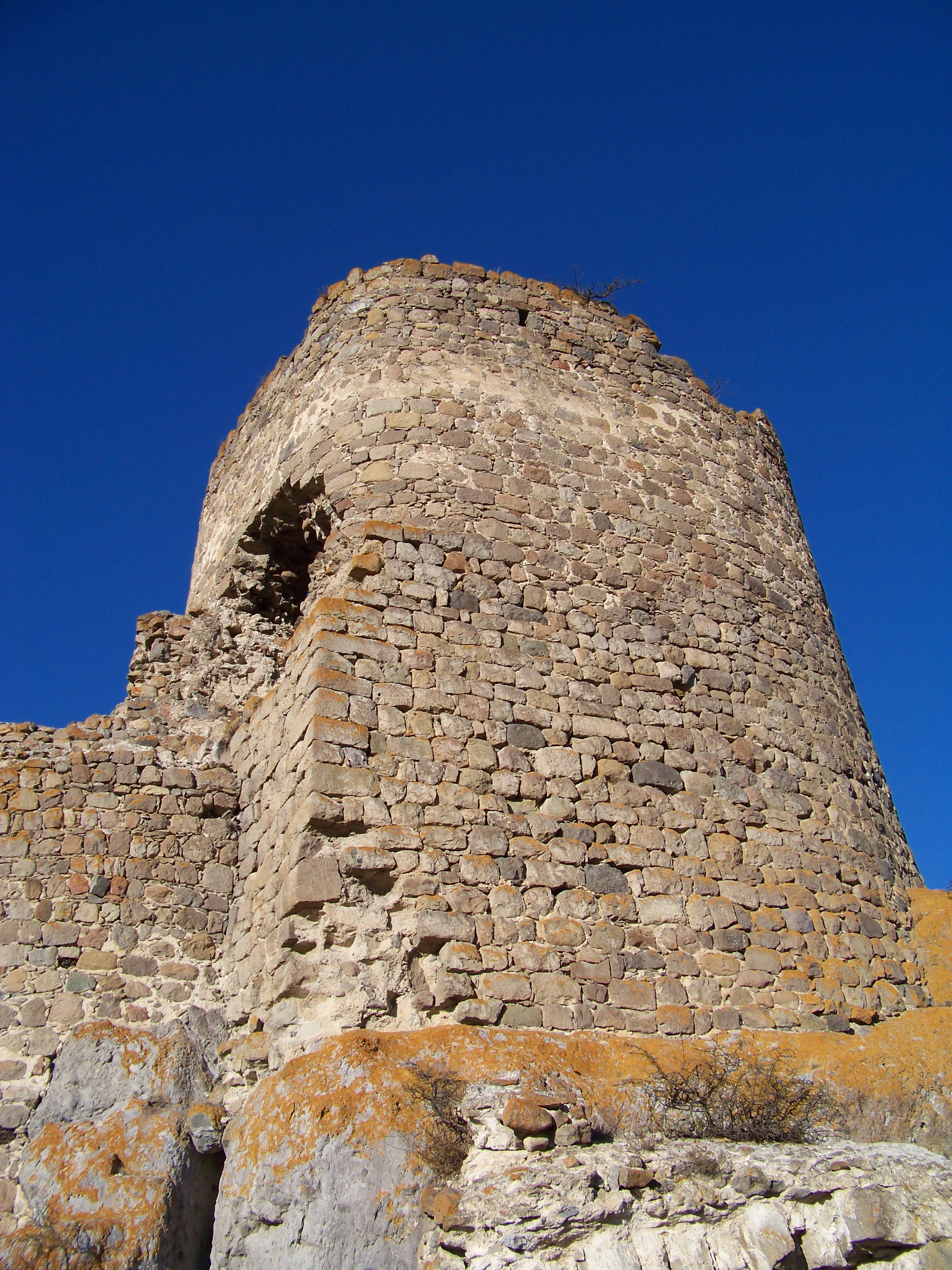
One of the fortress towers

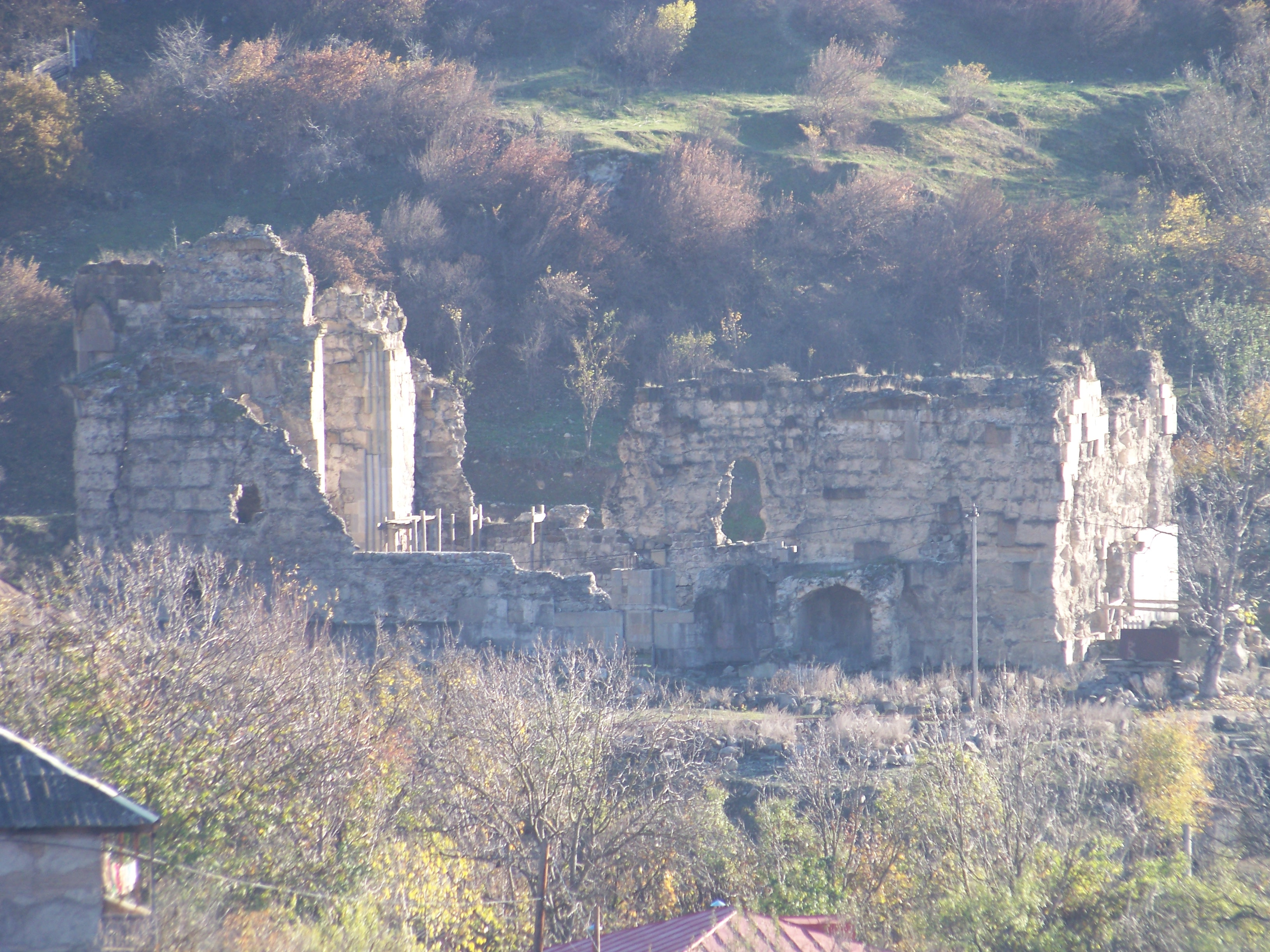
Church of the Virgin Mary of Atskuri

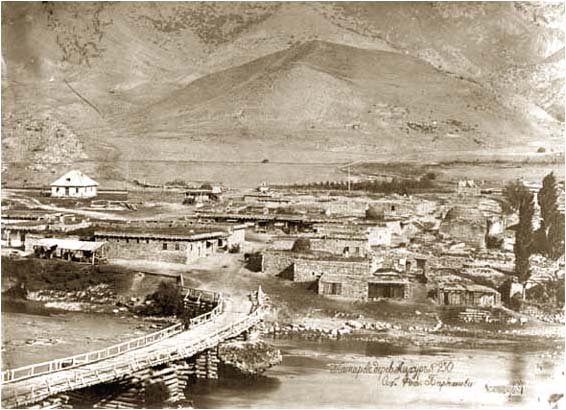
19th-century photograph by Vladimir Barkanov

View from Atskuri Fortress

== Literature ==
Georgian Soviet Encyclopedia, Vol. 2, Tbilisi, 1977, p. 77.
