= Ebezâde Abdullah Efendi Fountain =

Fountain in Fatih, Istanbul, Turkey

Coordinates: 41°01′26″N 28°56′44″E

- Ebezâde Abdullah Efendi Çeşmesi
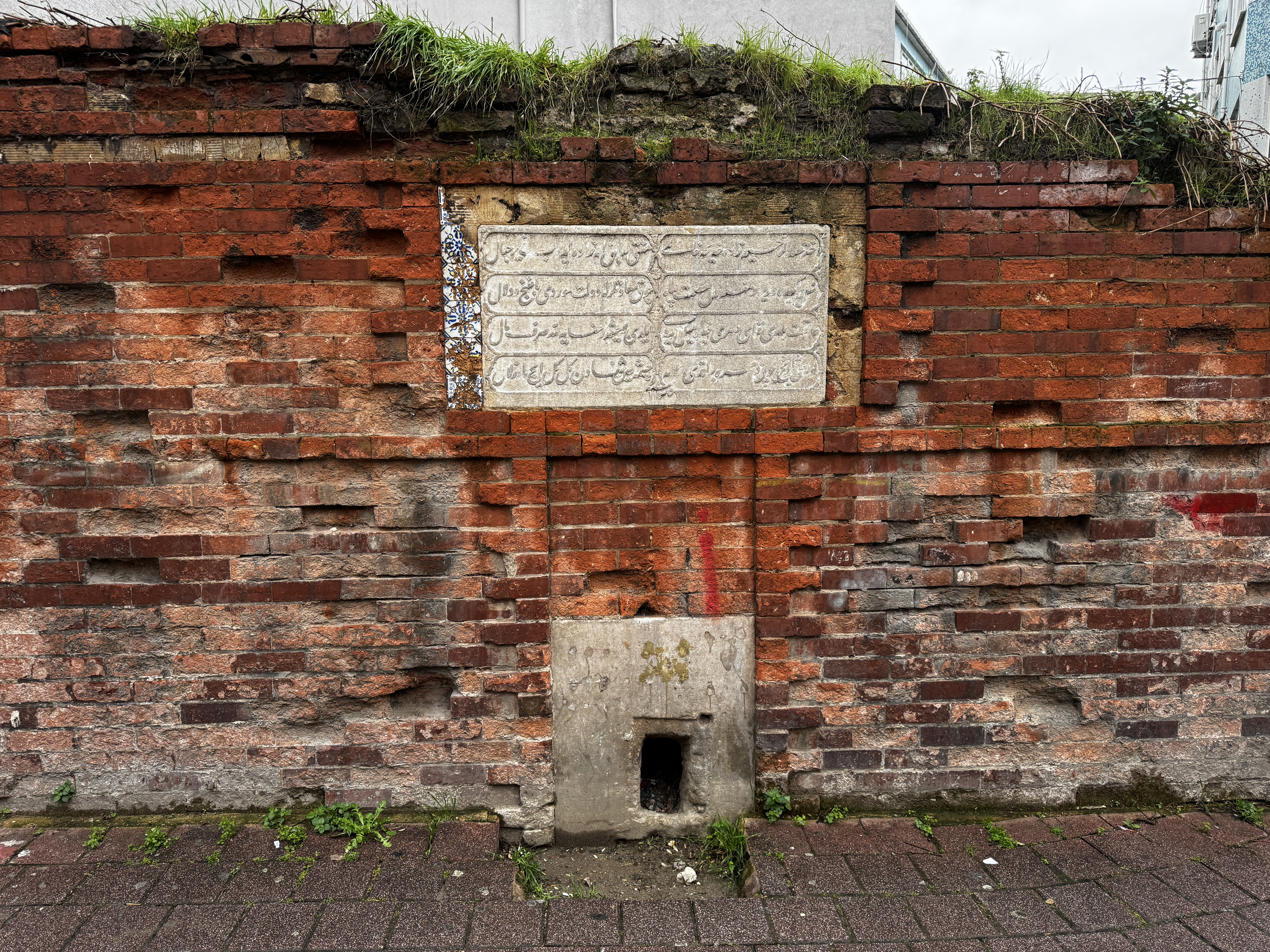
- The front facade of the fountain (January 2025)
- Alternative names: Ebezâde Fountain · Hatice Hanım Fountain

General information
- Status: Non-functional
- Type: Wall fountain
- Location: Fatih, Istanbul, Turkey
- Completed: 1722 or 1723
- Renovated: 1882 or 1883

The Ebezâde Abdullah Efendi Fountain (Turkish: Ebezâde Abdullah Efendi Çeşmesi), also known as the Ebezâde Fountain or the Hatice Hanım Fountain, is a fountain located in the Fatih district of Istanbul, Turkey. It was commissioned by Hatice Hanım, the wife of Ebezâde Abdullah Efendi, in 1722 or 1723. In 1882 or 1883, it was restored in the name of Köstenceli al-Hajj Ismail Agha and rebuilt in brick. A restoration inscription was added above the original construction inscription. According to a 1943 publication, the fountain was no longer functional at that time and has remained out of use since then.

It is located in the Atikali neighborhood. Most of its mirror stone, nozzle, basin, and seating platforms are buried underground. Except for the mirror stone and construction inscription, the fountain consists of a brick wall flanked on both sides by pilasters. Some brick rows on the façade protrude from the rest of the wall. The marble construction inscription above the mirror stone is surrounded on the sides and top by a border made of tiles, some of which still survive today. The inscription text, divided into eight cartouches, is arranged in two columns and four lines. The rectangular marble restoration inscription, placed above the lower border and containing two lines of text, is no longer extant.

== History ==
The fountain was built in 1722 or 1723 by Hatice Hanım in memory of her husband, Ebezâde Abdullah Efendi. (Note: The year 1135 in the inscription corresponds to 1722 or 1723 in the Gregorian calendar.) İbrahim Hilmi Tanışık incorrectly recorded the construction date as 1725 or 1726 in his 1943 book. (Note: He misread the year as 1138, which corresponds to 1725 or 1726.) The abjad value at the end of the inscription suggests the date as 1723 or 1724. (Note: The year 1136 corresponds to 1723 or 1724 in the Gregorian calendar.)

The fountain was supplied by the Mihrimah water system, part of the Halkalı sources. In 1882 or 1883, the fountain was rebuilt in brick during restoration conducted in the name of Köstenceli al-Hajj Ismail Agha. (Note: The year 1300 in the restoration inscription corresponds to 1882 or 1883.) A second inscription was added above the original one. Tanışık incorrectly gave the restoration date as 1891 or 1892. (Note: He misread the restoration year as 1309, corresponding to 1891 or 1892.)

Tanışık reported in his 1943 publication that the fountain was not flowing. Affan Egemen visited the fountain in 1978 and stated in his 1993 book that the fountain was non-functional and its basin was buried. Hatice Aynur and Hakan T. Karateke noted the presence of the restoration inscription during a visit in the early 1990s, but during another visit in April 2004, Aynur noted that the inscription was no longer in place.

== Location and architecture ==
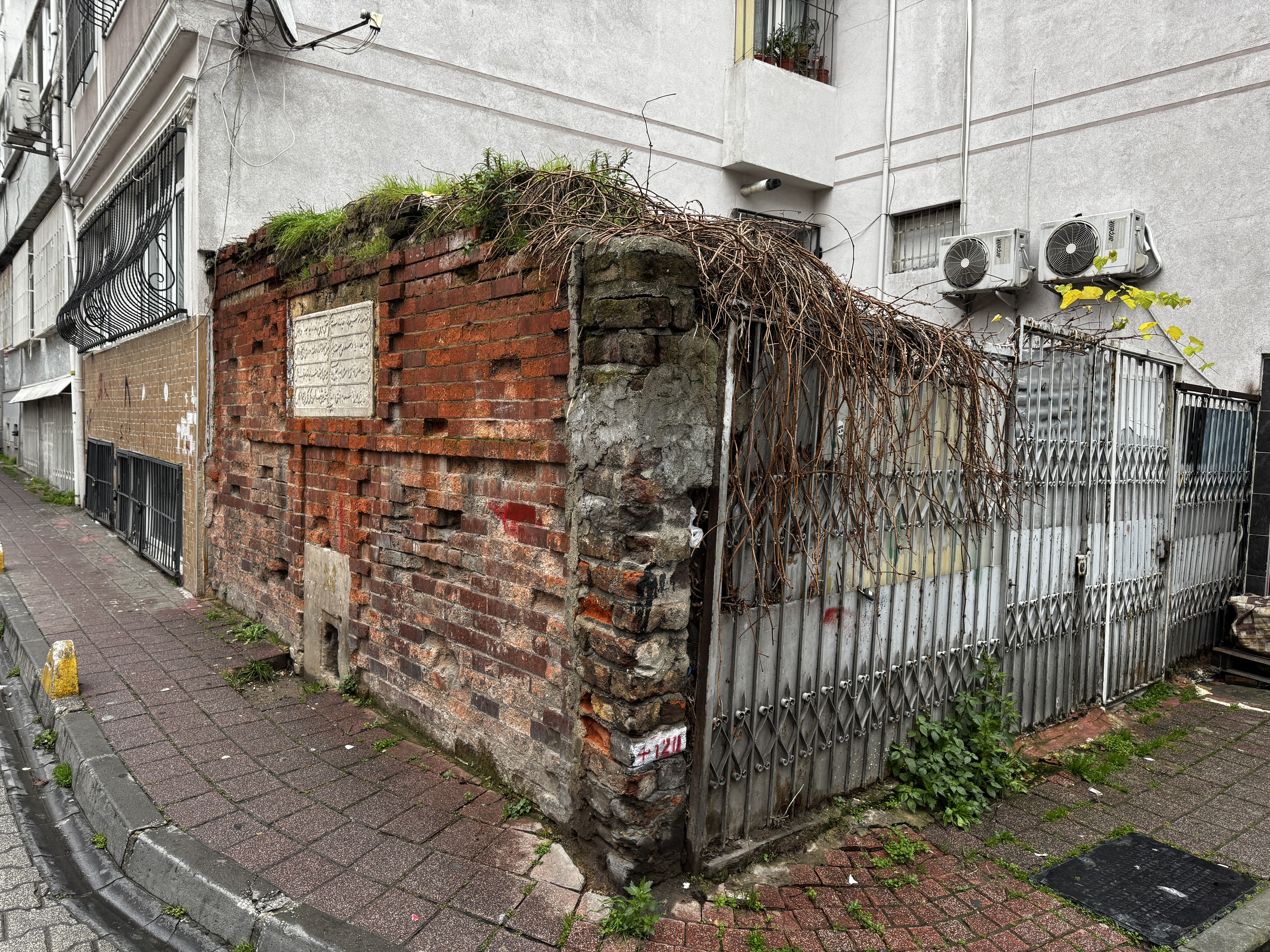
The location of the fountain (January 2025)

It is a wall fountain located in the Atikali neighborhood of the Fatih district of Istanbul, at the intersection of Bakkalzade Street and Fatih Avenue, opposite the Bakkalzade Mosque. The fountain is constructed on a 2.4 m high and 5.3 m wide brick wall, the rear side of which is hollow. The current state of the wall shows partially collapsed upper sections and pilasters on both sides.

Most of the unbricked mirror stone, nozzle, basin, and seating platforms are buried. In the lower part of the west-facing front, just above the mirror stone, is a rectangular basin hole measuring 25×33 cm. Each side of the exposed mirror stone is flanked by a full and half-brick laid in a protruding manner. A brick row at 1.16 m above ground also protrudes similarly. The marble construction inscription above the mirror stone, set within bricks, measures 110×55 cm. Though originally bordered on three sides with tiles of blue floral motifs on a white background, only the left-side tiles survive today. The inscription is inscribed in eight cartouches arranged in two columns and four lines, with the construction date in a smaller cartouche. Spaces between the cartouches and the edges feature various rosette motifs. The inscription, written in taliq script, reads as follows:

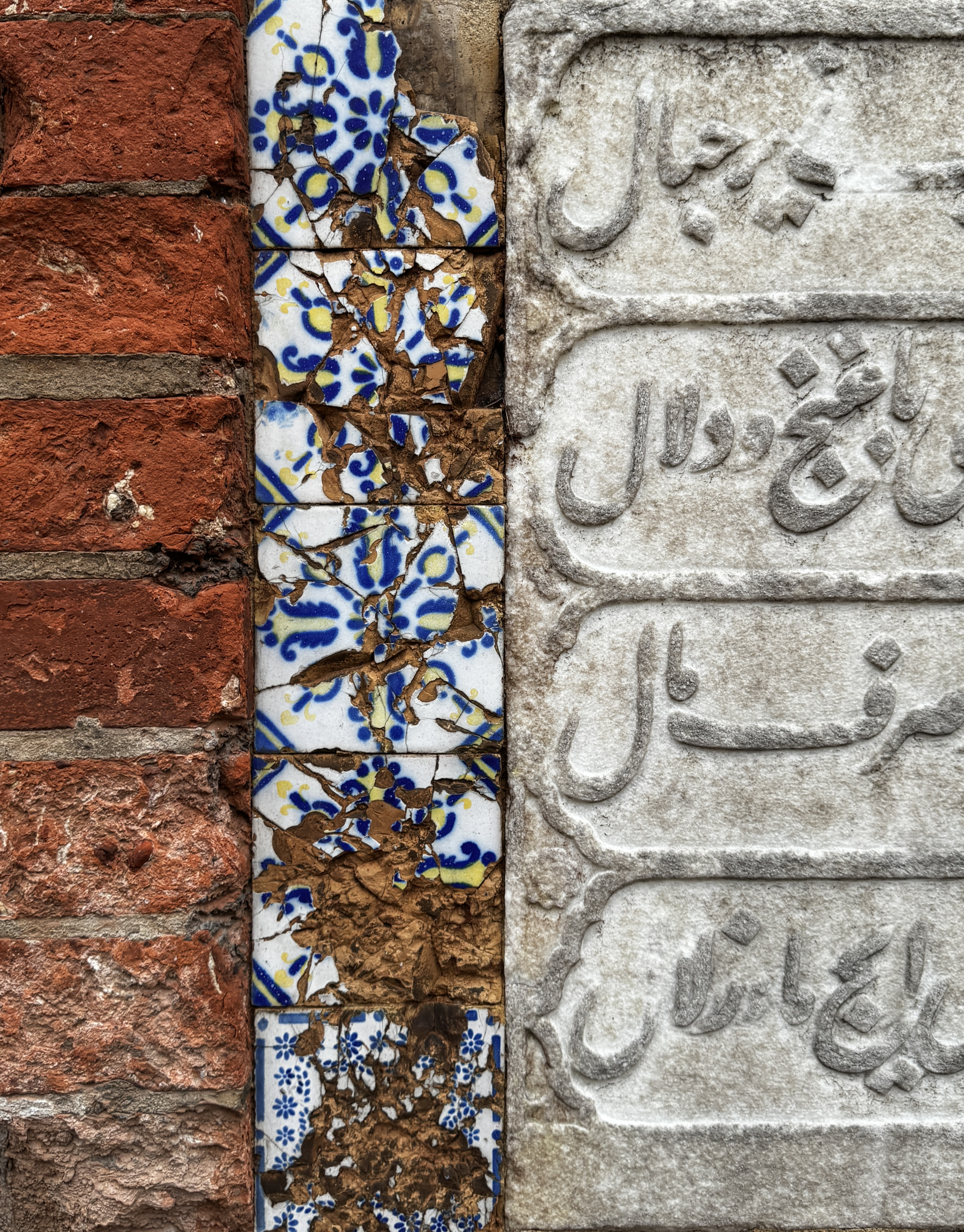
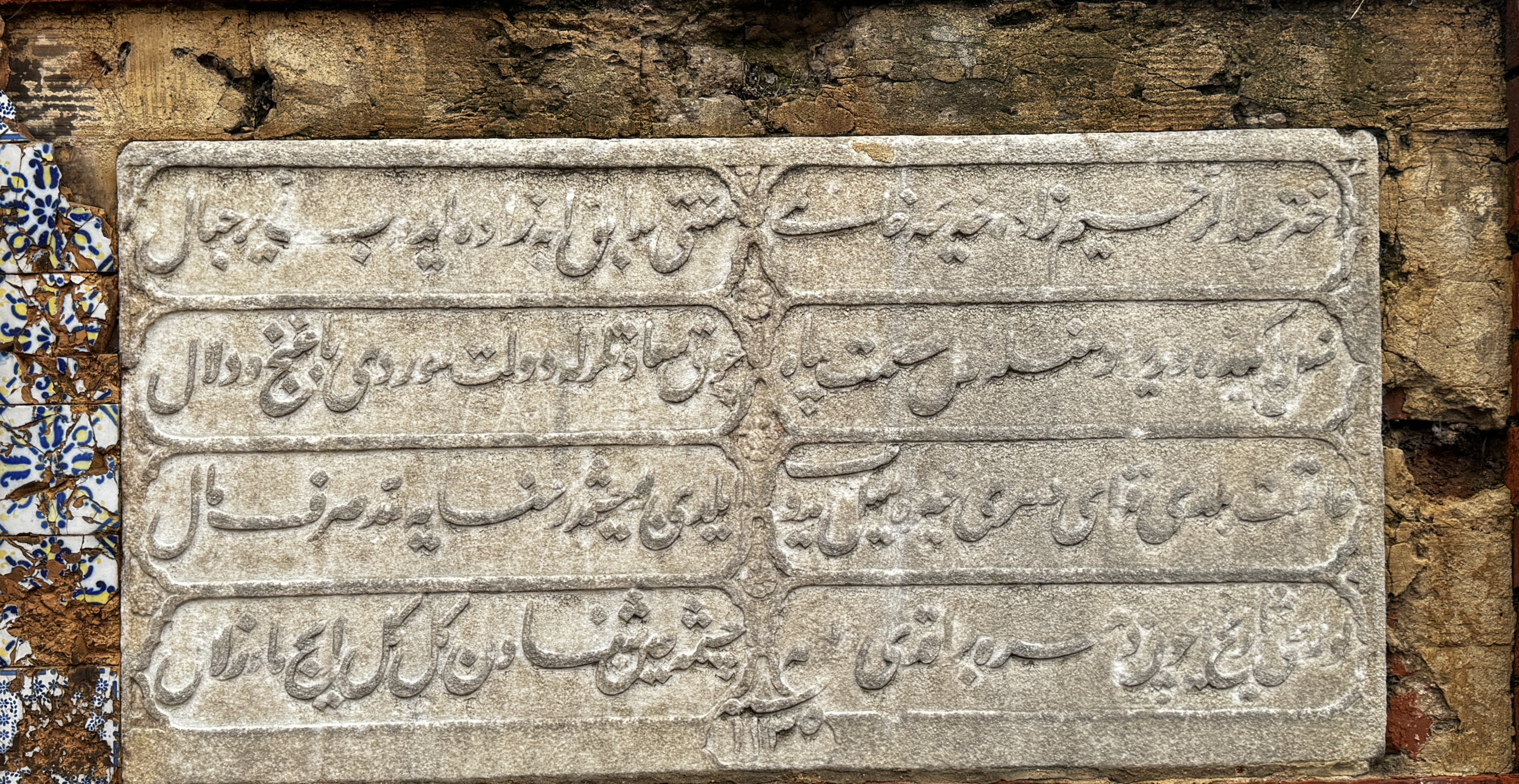
The fountain's construction inscription (right) and the tiles surrounding the inscription (left) (January 2025)

Ottoman Turkish Inscription

دختر ء عبد الرحیم زادە خدیجە خانمی
مفتی ء سابق ابە - زادە ادیب زیر ء حبال
نسل پاكیندە وزیر اولمغلە اول عصمت پناه
چوق سعادتلرلە دولت سوردی با غنج و دلال

عاقبت بیلدی فنای دهری خیرە میل ایدوب
أیلەدی بو چشمە رعنایە للّٰە صرف مال
لولەسی تاریخ ایچون دهرە بیراقدی ولولە
چشمە عین شفادن گل گل ایچ ما زلال

سنه ١١۳٥

Transcription

Duhter-i Abdürrahîm-zâde Hadîce Hânımı
Müftî-i sâbık Ebe-zâde idüb zîr-i hibâl
Nesl-i pâkinde vezîr olmakla ol ismet-penâh
Çok sa'âdetlerle devlet sürdü bâ-gunc u delâl

'Âkıbet bildi fenâ-yı dehri hayrâ meyl idüb
Eyledi bu çeşme-i ra'nâya lillâh sarf-ı mâl
Lûlesi târîh için dehre bıraktı velvele
Çeşme-i 'ayn-ı şifâdan gel gel iç mâ-i zülâl

Sene 1135

Modern English

Hatice Hanım, daughter of Abdurrahim‑zâde,
Once wife of the former mufti of the noble Ebezâde house,
Born of a pure lineage and upheld by the honor of viziers,
She governed her domain with abundant felicity through both prosperity and trial

Realizing the fleeting nature of this world, she turned to acts of charity,
And for God's sake consecrated her wealth to this radiant fountain.
She bequeathed its spout as a proclamation down the ages:
Come, come—drink the crystal‑clear, healing waters of this spring

Year 1135 (Hijri)

Above the construction inscription were two rows of tile borders featuring meander and four-armed geometric motifs in white, blue, and yellow, but none survive today. The rectangular marble restoration inscription with two lines of taliq script, situated above the lower border and beneath an ogee arch, measured 80×40 cm and is also missing today.

Inscription

هو
كوستنجەلی ال- حاج اسماعیل مرحومڭ خیراتی
اولمق أوزرە بنا و انشا لونمشدر

سنە ۱۳۰۰

Transcription

Hû
Köstenceli el-Hâc İsmâ'îl merhûmun hayrâtı
olmak üzere binâ ve inşâ olunmuştur

Sene 1300

Modern English

In the name of God
This fountain was built
as a charitable endowment of the late Köstenceli al-Hajj Ismail

Year 1300

Due to its brick construction and use of tile, the fountain differs architecturally from other Tulip Period fountains. Art historian Fazilet Koçyiğit noted that the colors of the tiles are similar to those of Kütahya tiles and those in the Palace of the Porphyrogenitus. Given that tile workshops existed in the Palace of the Porphyrogenitus during this period, she suggests they may have been produced there. However, due to the lack of design continuity, she also considers the possibility that the tiles were brought from another structure.
