= Bakkalzade Mosque =

Small Ottoman-era mosque in Istanbul, Turkey

- Bakkalzade Camii
- Location in Istanbul

Religion
- Affiliation: Sunni Islam

Location
- Location: Atikali, Fatih, Istanbul, Turkey
- Interactive map of Bakkalzade Mosque
- Coordinates: 41.011°N 28.966°E

Architecture
- Architect: unknown
- Type: Mosque
- Style: Ottoman
- Groundbreaking: unknown
- Completed: before 1845

Specifications
- Minaret: 1
- Materials: Cut stone

Bakkalzade Mosque (Turkish: Bakkalzade Camii) is a small Ottoman-era mosque located on Bakkalzade Street in the Atikali neighbourhood of the Fatih district in Istanbul, Turkey. Although its exact date of foundation is unknown, it is first attested on an 1845 city map of Istanbul, where it appears among the mosques built before that year.

== History ==
The Bakkalzade Mosque originally served the local residents of the Atikali quarter. Over time—and particularly during the late 20th century—the building fell into disuse and disrepair, at one point even being used as a temporary parking area.

== Restoration and conservation ==
In 2010, preliminary archaeological and architectural surveys were carried out, marking the beginning of an extensive restoration project. In 2013, the Directorate General of Foundations (Vakıflar Genel Müdürlüğü) signed a protocol with the Hazreti Ayşe Foundation to rehabilitate the structure.

- 2016: Reconstruction design approved by the Istanbul Regional Board for the Protection of Cultural Heritage.
- 2018: Site environs and pedestrian access works completed.
- 2021: Restoration of the adjacent hazire (graveyard) and ancillary features approved and executed.

== Architecture ==
The mosque is constructed of locally sourced cut stone. It has a single-domed prayer hall with a simple rectangular plan and one minaret attached to its northeast corner. The entrance façade features a plain portal surmounted by a shallow pediment. Inside, the original mihrab and minbar were lost over time and have been reconstructed in sympathy with typical 19th-century Ottoman provincial style.

== Location and access ==
Bakkalzade Mosque stands on Bakkalzade Street (Bakkalzade Sokak), opposite the Ebezâde Abdullah Efendi Fountain. It is a ten‑minute walk from the Edirnekapı tram stop on the T5 line.

== See also ==
- List of mosques in Turkey
- Ottoman architecture
