= Çınar incident =

17th-century rebellion in the Ottoman Empire

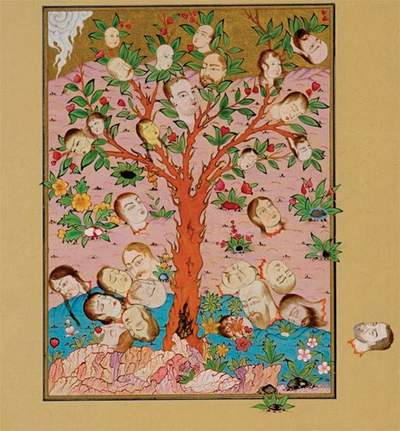

Çınar incident (Platanus Incident) is the name of a 17th-century rebellion in the Ottoman Empire. It is also sometimes known as "The Event of the Wakwak" (Vakʿa-ı Vakvakiye), named after a mythical tree on which human beings grew, as an analogy to the corpses hung from trees in the aftermath of the rebellion.

== Background ==
During the Cretan War (1645–1669), military expenditures of the Ottoman Empire increased, and the empire began experiencing economic difficulties. Sultan Mehmet IV was only a teenager and the regent, Valide Sultan (queen mother) Turhan Hatice and the short term grand viziers, could not find a solution. Especially after the execution of the reformist grand vizier Tarhoncu Ahmet Pasha, who tried to cut back palace expenditures, the only solution proposed was a devaluation. So, the ratio of gold in coins was reduced. The new coins minted were known as "red coin". The salaries were paid in the red coins. But even then, payment to some soldiers was delayed as much as nine months and the markets in Constantinople refused to accept the red coins.

== Incident ==
A group of soldiers who had returned from Crete in 1656, sent their representatives to the Palace and demanded payment of their salaries. But the representatives were expelled from the palace by Osman Aga, a senior palace guard. This triggered a rebellion on 26 February 1656. The rebels asked to meet with the sultan on 4 March. Such meetings were known as "ayak divanı" (literally: "meeting with folk"). During the meeting, they presented a list of 30 men, whom they thought responsible for the economic crisis, and wanted executed. The young sultan agreed to dismiss some of these, including Osman Aga. But he tried to save their lives, and the angry rebels were not satisfied. They killed most of the people on the list, hanging them from a big Platanus orientalis tree (Turkish: çınar).

== Aftermath ==
The Çınar Incident showed the regent Valide Sultan Turhan the urgent need of an able administration. Before the Çınar Incident, ten grand viziers had been appointed in a rapid sequence in eight years between 1648 and 1656, since Mehmet's accession. Short-term grand viziers were ineffective in solving the problems of the empire. So she appointed Köprülü Mehmet Pasha as the new grand vizier in the following September. Köprülü Mehmet accepted the post only after Turhan promised not to interfere with his administration. It soon became clear that Köprülü Mehmet was a wise choice.

== See also ==
- Köprülü era
- Sultanate of Women
