= Atskuri Culture House =

- Atskuri Culture House
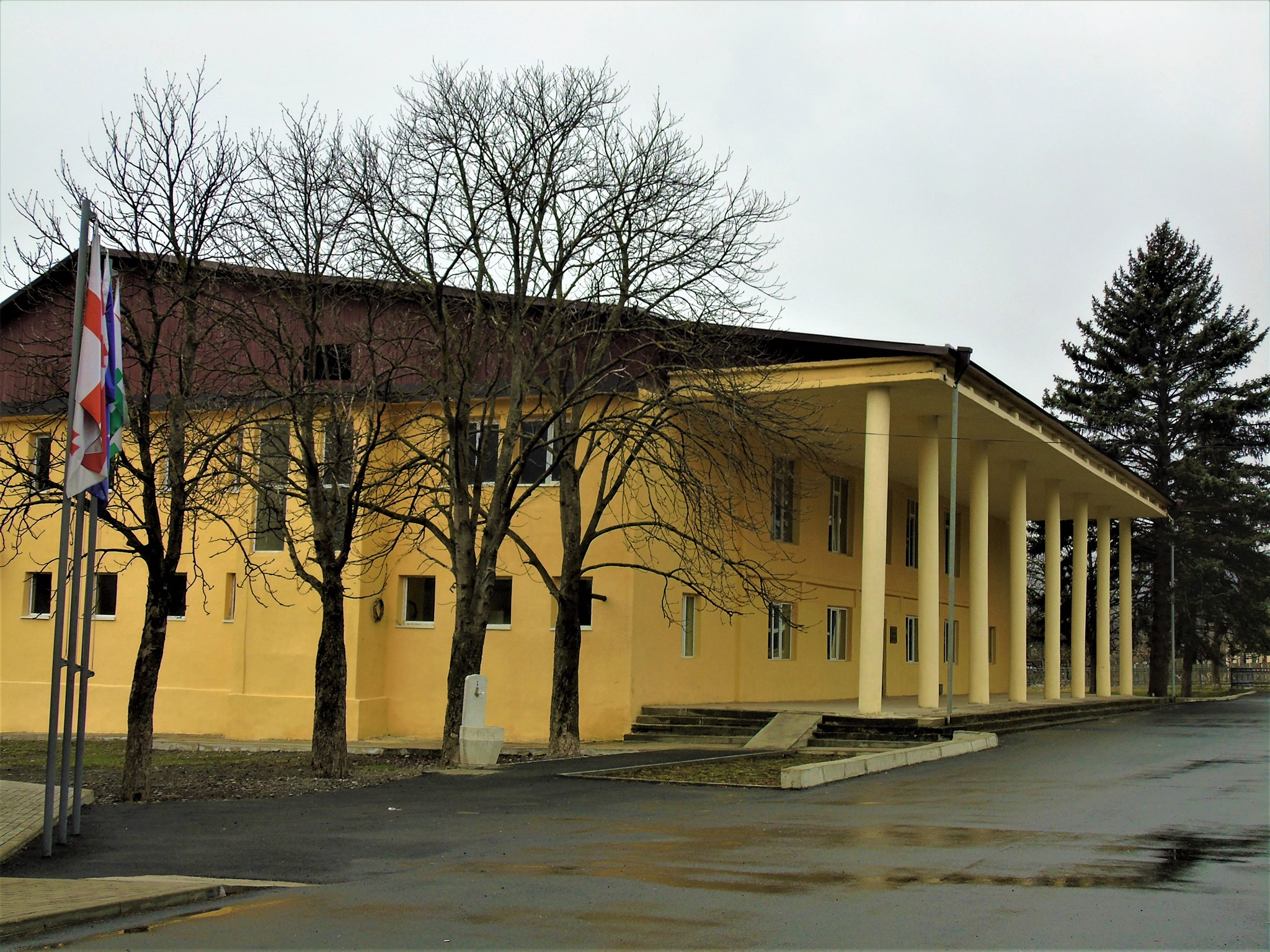
- Culture House in 2022
- Interactive map of the Atskuri Culture House area

General information
- Location: Atskuri, Akhaltsikhe Municipality, Georgia
- Coordinates: 41°43′45″N 43°09′36″E
- Elevation: 917 m
- Opened: 1970
- Renovated: 2017

Atskuri Culture House is a cultural, educational, and entertainment center located in the village of Atskuri, Akhaltsikhe Municipality, Georgia. The building was constructed in 1970 and has since served as the main cultural hub of the village. Until the 1990s, the Culture House included a cinema hall. Today, the building hosts the local library and the office of the local administrative representative. It also serves as a venue for arts education classes and folk performances.

In 2017, the Atskuri Culture House underwent reconstruction and renovation. The project included the replacement of doors and windows, installation of electrical systems and sanitary facilities, and interior refurbishment. Later, the surrounding area was improved with the creation of a park, known locally as the “club yard,” and a sports field.

The renovation of the Culture House was funded by the local budget and the Regional Projects Fund, with a total cost of 110,556 GEL.

In 2024, the former cinema hall within the Culture House was fully renovated and equipped with modern facilities. A new stage was installed, along with 174 seats, upgraded lighting, and a sound-dampening acoustic system.

== Gallery ==
Atskuri Culture House in 2017

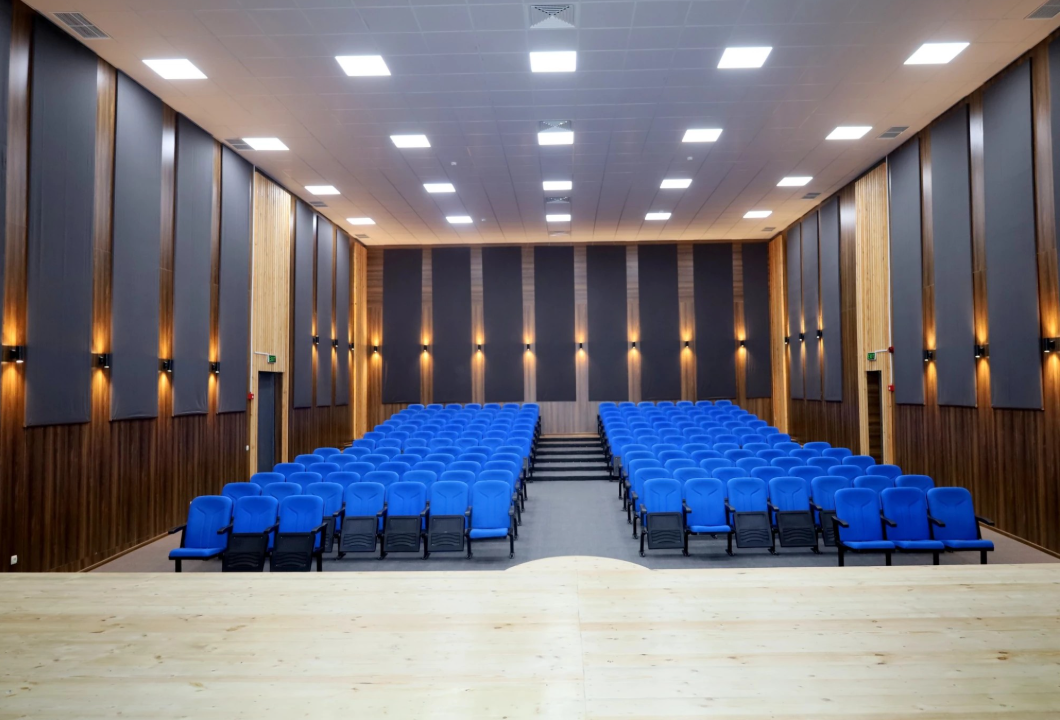
Renovated hall

Winter, 2020

Community center and Culture House
