= Mehmed IV =

Sultan of the Ottoman Empire from 1648 to 1687

- Custodian of the Two Holy Mosques
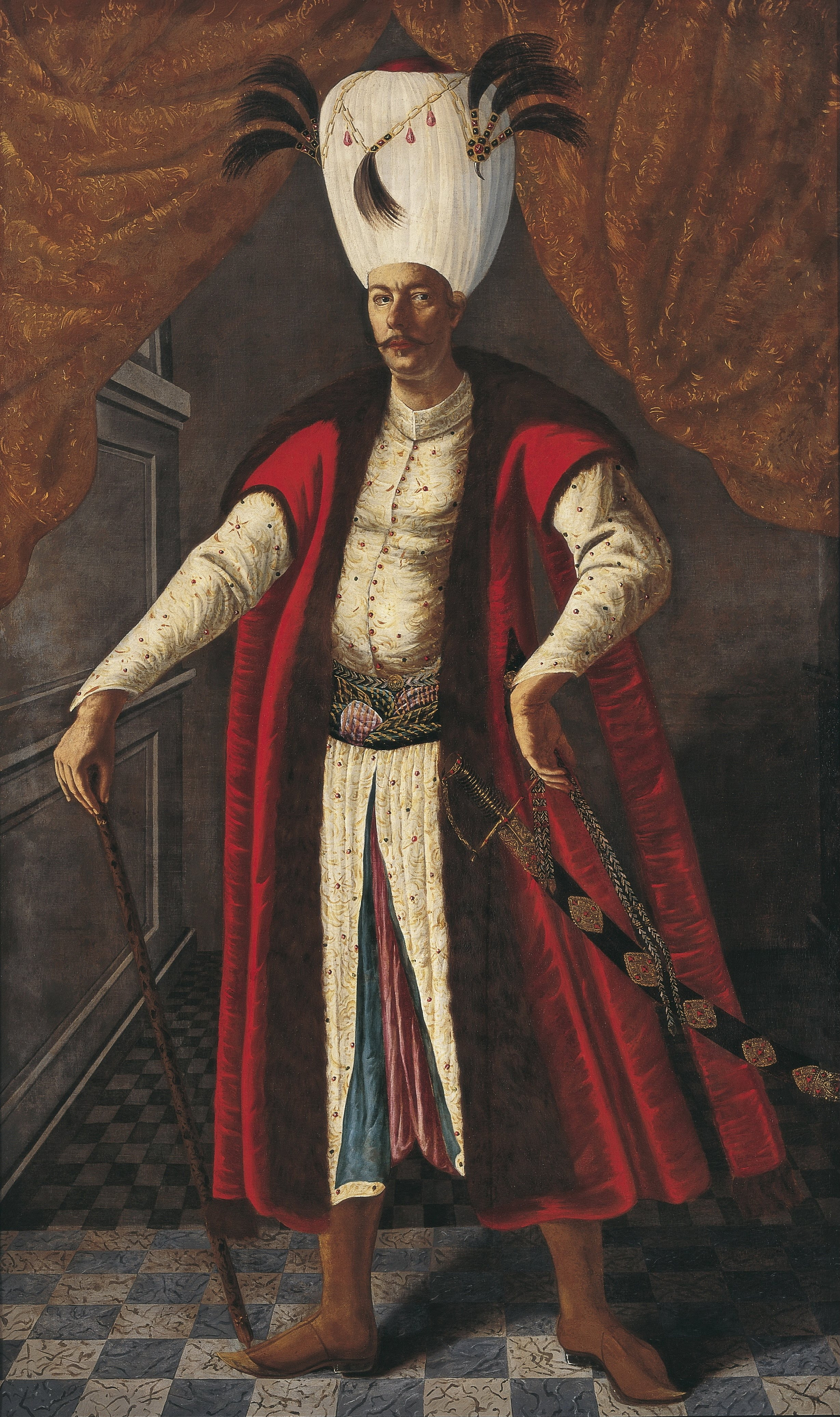
- Portrait, 1671

Sultan of the Ottoman Empire (Padishah)
- Reign: 8 August 1648 – 8 November 1687
- Predecessor: Ibrahim
- Successor: Suleiman II
- Regents: See list: Kösem Sultan (8 August 1648 – 2 September 1651) Turhan Sultan (3 September 1651 – 2 June 1656)

Ottoman caliph (Amir al-Mu'minin)
- Predecessor: Ibrahim
- Successor: Suleiman II
- Born: 2 January 1642; Topkapı Palace, Constantinople, Ottoman Empire
- Died: 6 January 1693 (aged 51); Edirne, Ottoman Empire
- Burial: Tomb of Turhan Sultan, New Mosque, Istanbul, Turkey
- Consort: Emetullah Rabia Gülnuş Sultan; Others
- Issue Among others: Hatice Sultan; Mustafa II; Ahmed III; Ümmügülsüm Sultan; Fatma Emetullah Sultan
Names
- Mehmed bin Ibrahim
- Dynasty: Ottoman
- Father: Ibrahim
- Mother: Turhan Sultan
- Religion: Sunni Islam
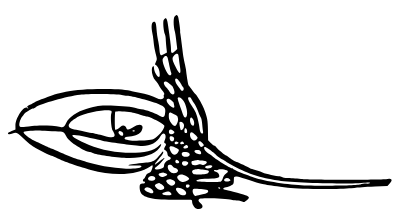
- Tughra

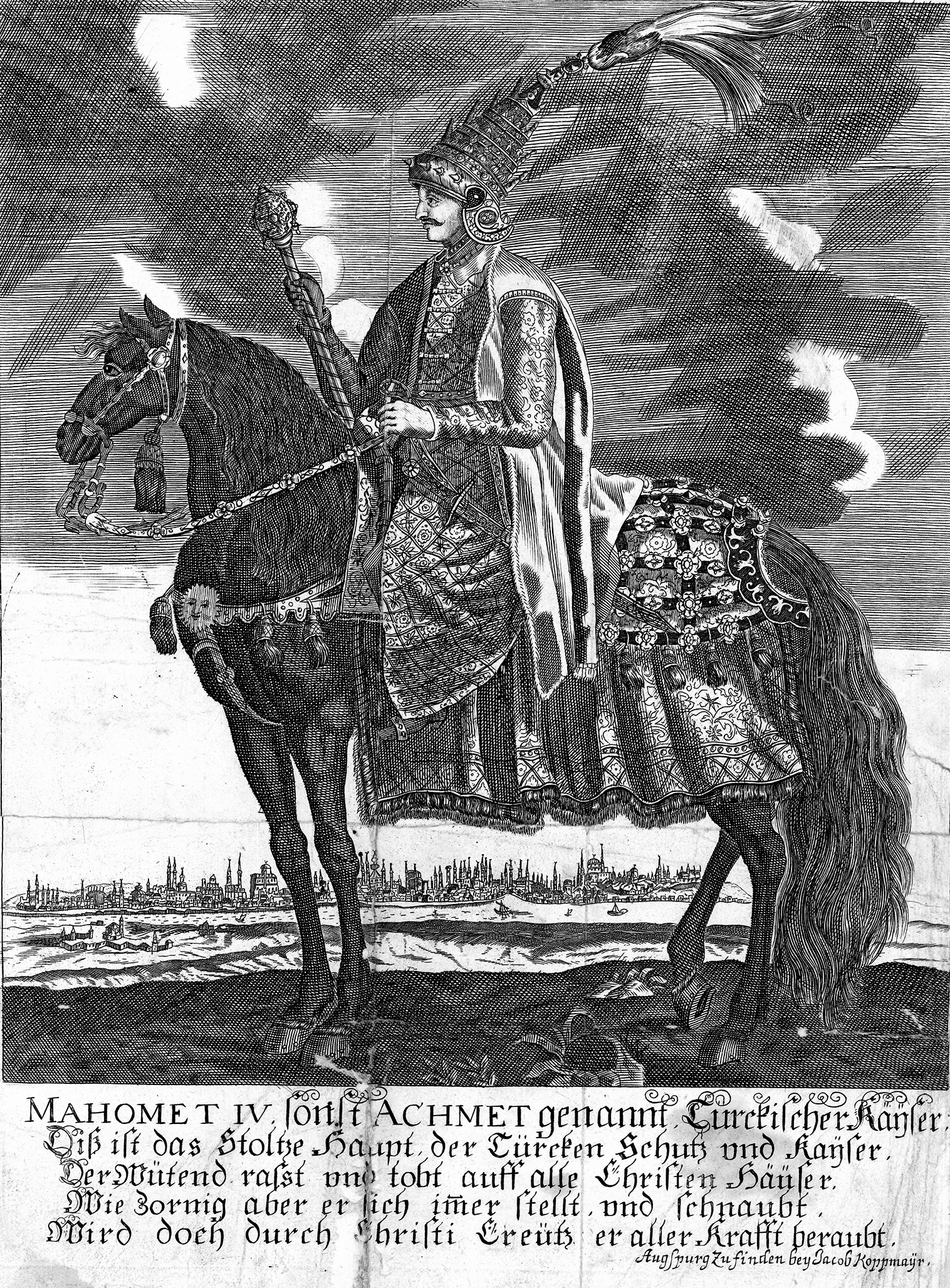
Depiction of Mehmed IV with the Venetian helmet, by Jacob Koppmayer (1640-1701)

Mehmed IV (Ottoman Turkish: محمد رابع, romanized: Meḥmed-i rābi; Turkish: IV. Mehmed; 2 January 1642 – 6 January 1693), nicknamed as Mehmed the Hunter (Turkish: Avcı Mehmed), was the sultan of the Ottoman Empire from 1648 to 1687. He came to the throne at the age of six after his father was overthrown in a coup. Mehmed went on to become the second-longest-reigning sultan in Ottoman history after Suleiman the Magnificent. While the initial and final years of his reign were characterized by military defeat and political instability, during his middle years he oversaw the revival of the empire's fortunes associated with the Köprülü era. Mehmed IV was known by contemporaries as a particularly pious ruler, and was referred to as gazi, or "holy warrior" for his role in the many conquests carried out during his long reign.

Under Mehmed IV's reign, the empire reached the height of its territorial expansion in Europe. From a young age he developed a keen interest in hunting, for which he is known as avcı (translated as "the Hunter"). In 1687, Mehmed was overthrown by soldiers disenchanted by the course of the ongoing War of the Holy League. He subsequently retired to Edirne, where he resided and died of natural causes in 1693.

== Early life ==
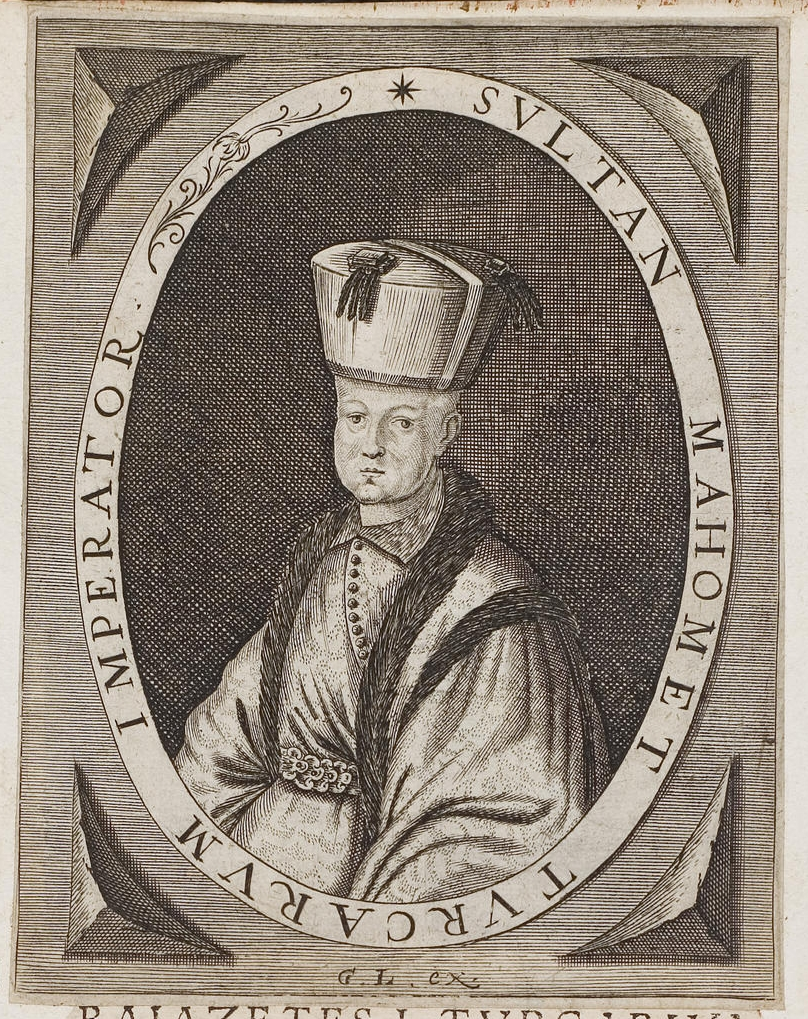
Engraving of a young Mehmed IV

Born at Topkapı Palace, Constantinople, in 1642, Mehmed was the son of Sultan Ibrahim (r. 1640–1648) by Turhan Sultan, a concubine of Russian origin, and grandson of the Greek-born Kösem Sultan, the former Haseki sultan and legal wife of Mehmed's deceased grandfather Sultan Ahmed I (r. 1603-1617). Soon after his birth, his father and mother quarrelled, and Ibrahim was so enraged that he tore Mehmed from his mother's arms and flung the infant into a cistern. Mehmed was rescued by the harem servants. However, this left Mehmed with a lifelong scar on his head.

== Reign ==
=== Accession ===
Mehmed ascended to the throne in 1648 at the age of six, (Note: He is often reported as having been seven years old upon his accession, a result of the Turkish method of calculating age.) during a very volatile time for the Ottoman dynasty. On 21 October 1649, Mehmed along with his brothers Suleiman and Ahmed were circumcised.

Kösem Sultan, Mehmed's grandmother and regent, was suspected of supporting the rebels and plotting to poison the sultan and replace him with his younger half-brother, Suleiman. As a result, Mehmed agreed to sign his grandmother's death warrant in September 1651.

The empire faced palace intrigues as well as uprisings in Anatolia, the defeat of the Ottoman navy by the Venetians outside the Dardanelles, and food shortages leading to riots in Constantinople. It was under these circumstances that Mehmed's mother granted Köprülü Mehmed Pasha full executive powers as Grand Vizier. Köprülü took office on 14 September 1656. Mehmed IV presided over the Köprülü era, an exceptionally stable period of Ottoman history. Mehmed is known as Avcı, "the Hunter", as this outdoor exercise took up much of his time.

=== Wars ===
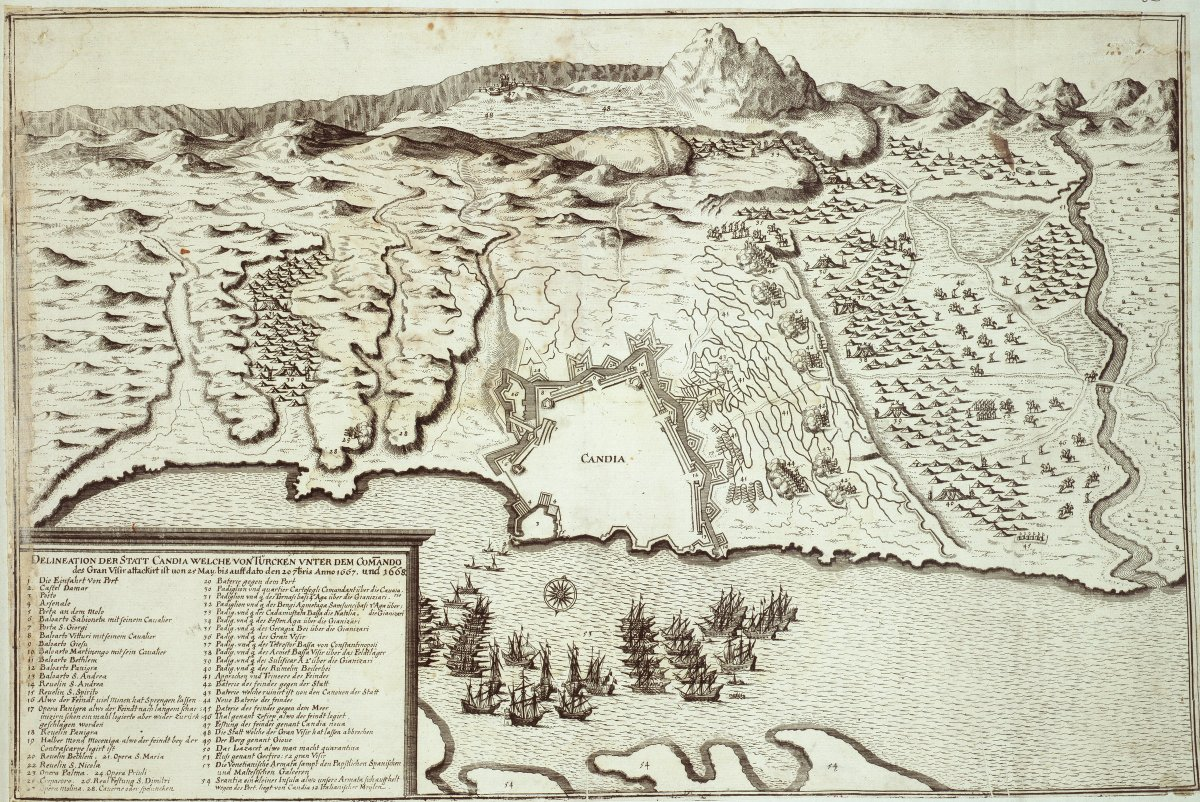
Siege of Candia by the Ottoman army

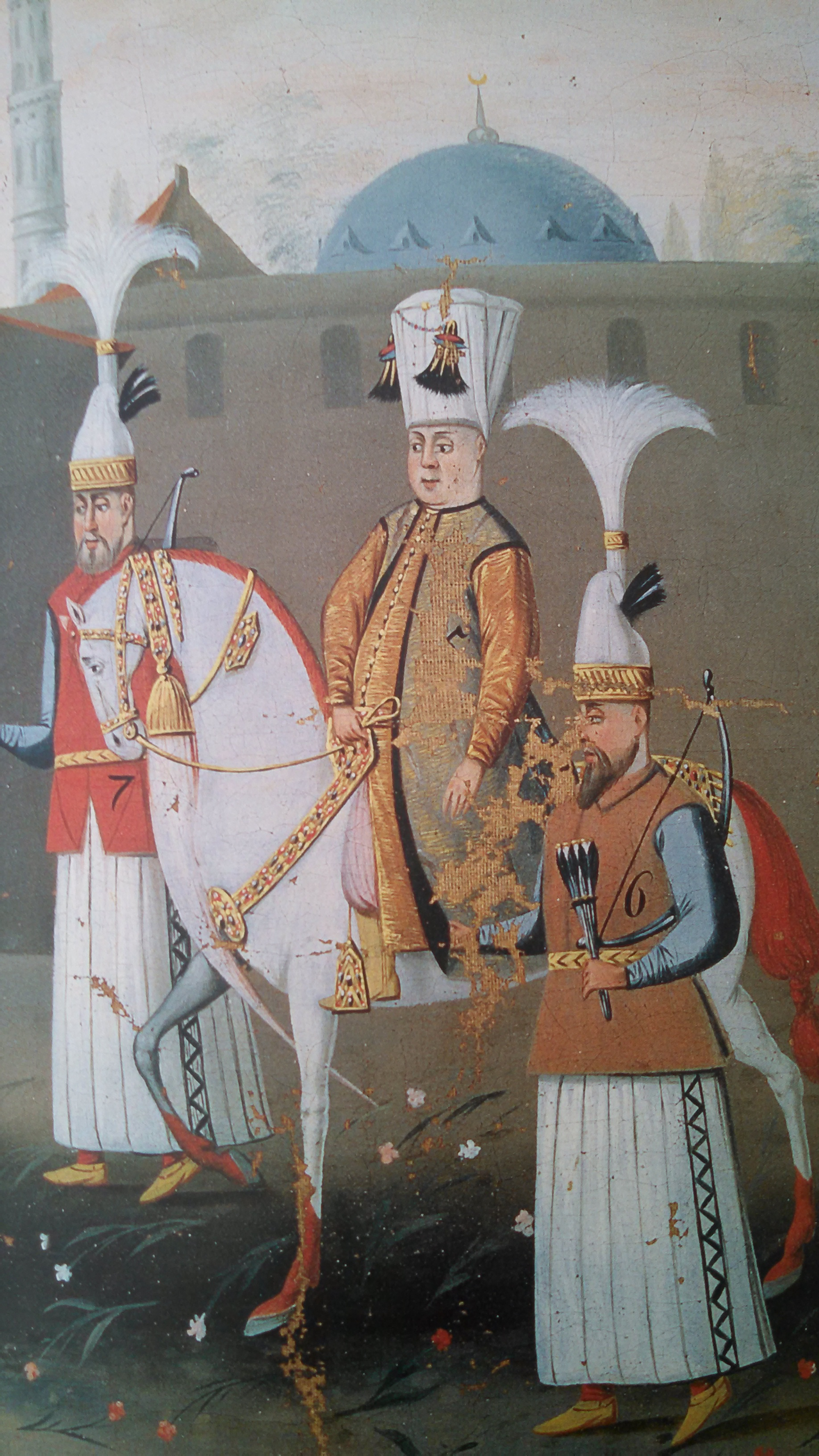
Mehmed IV as a teenager, on procession from Istanbul to Edirne in 1657

Mehmed's reign is notable for a revival of Ottoman fortunes led by the Grand Vizier Köprülü Mehmed and his son Fazıl Ahmed. They regained the Aegean islands from Venice, and Crete, during the Cretan War (1645–1669). They also fought successful campaigns against Transylvania (1660) and Poland (1670–1674). When Mehmed IV accepted the vassalage of Petro Doroshenko, Ottoman rule extended into Podolia and Right-bank Ukraine. This event would lead the Ottomans into the Russo-Turkish War (1676–1681). His next vizier, Köprülü Mehmed's adopted son Merzifonlu Kara Mustafa, led campaigns against Russia, besieging Chyhyryn in 1678 with 70,000 men. He next supported the 1683 Hungarian uprising of Imre Thököly against Austrian rule, marching a vast army through Hungary and besieged Vienna. At the Battle of Vienna on the Kahlenberg Heights, the Ottomans suffered a catastrophic rout by Polish-Lithuanian forces famously led by King John III Sobieski (1674–1696), and his allies, notably the Imperial army.

In 1672 and 1673, the sultan, who embarked on two Polish-Lithuanian campaigns with serdar-ı ekrem and Grand Vizier Fazıl Ahmed Pasha, and the acquisition of the Kamaniçi Castle, returned to Edirne after the signing of the Bucaş Treaty.

=== Fire of 1660 ===
The fire of 4–5 July 1660 was the worst conflagration Constantinople had experienced to date. It started in Eminönü and spread to most of the historic peninsula, burning much of the city. Even the minarets of Suleiman I's mosque burned. Two-thirds of Constantinople was turned to ash in the conflagration, and as many as forty thousand people were killed. Thousands died in the famine and plague which followed the fire.

=== Great Turkish War ===
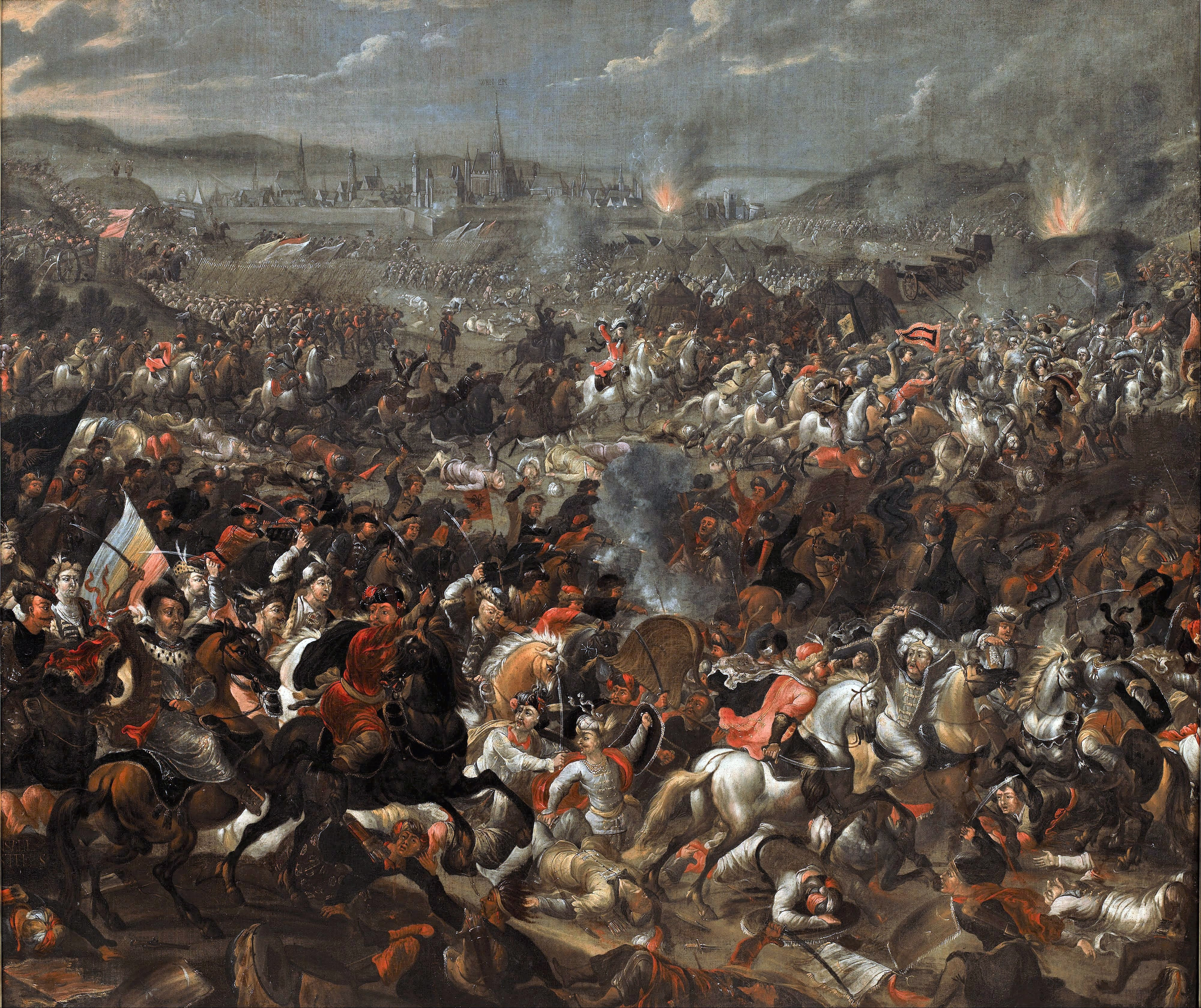
Painting depicting the Battle of Vienna of 1683 by Gonzales Franciscus Casteels

On 12 September 1683, the Austrians and their Polish-Lithuanian allies under King John III Sobieski won the Battle of Vienna with a devastating flank attack led by Sobieski's Polish cavalry. The Turks retreated into Hungary; however, this was only the beginning of the Great Turkish War, as the armies of the Holy League began their successful campaign to push the Ottomans back to the Balkans.

=== Later life and death ===
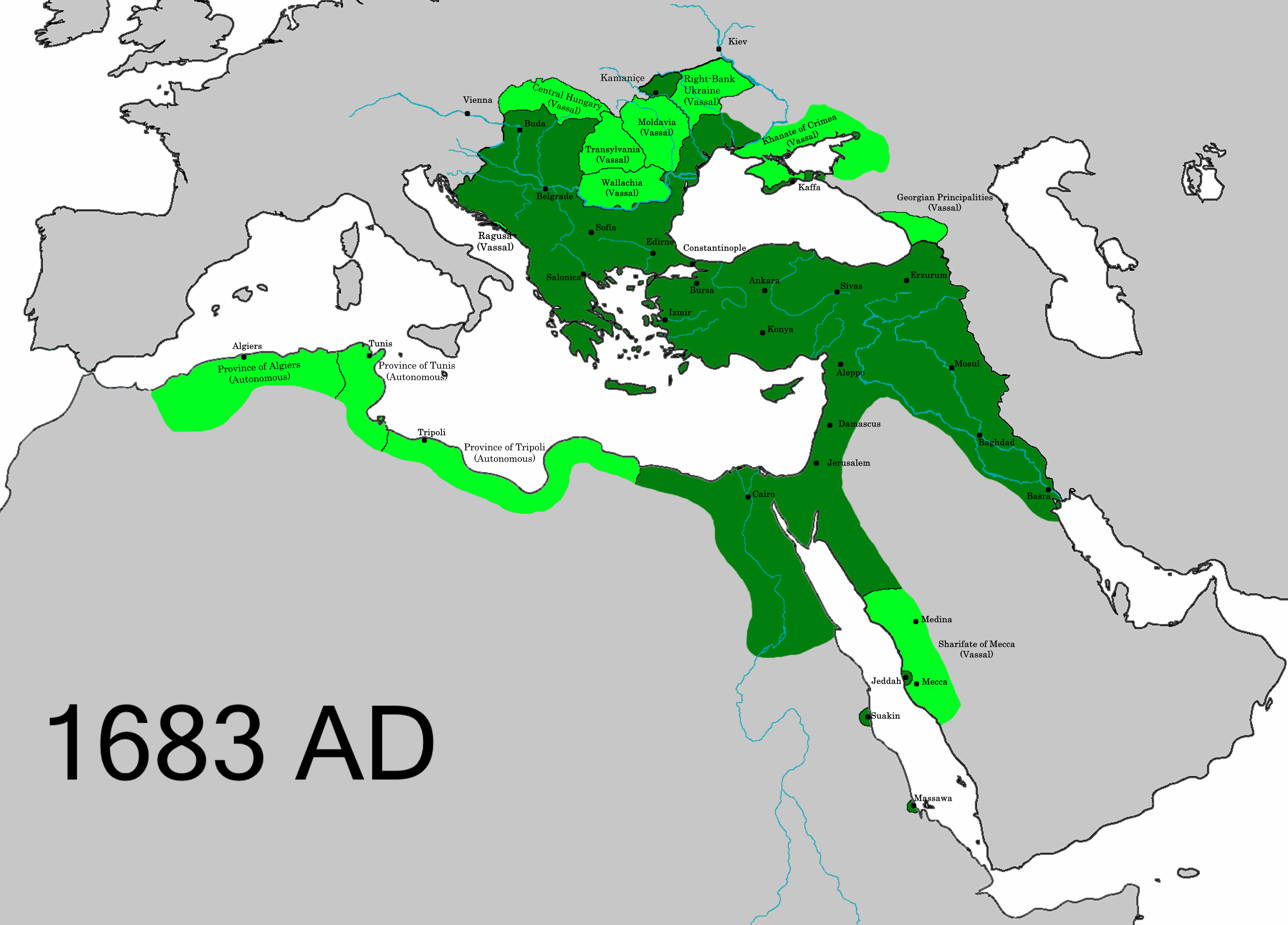
The Ottoman Empire under Mehmed IV. Light green areas are vassal states.

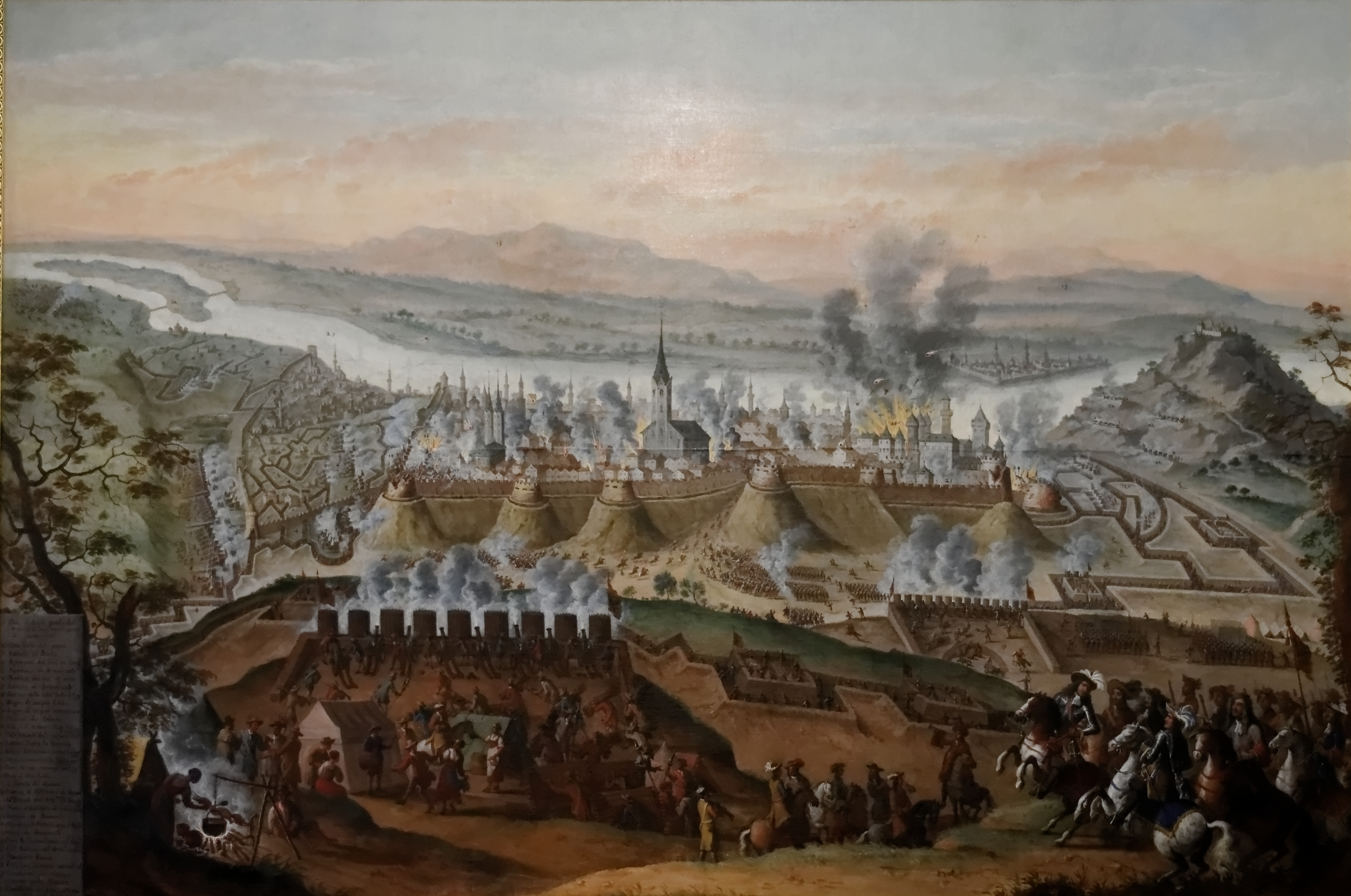
The siege of united Christian forces in Buda, 1686, by Frans Geffels

In May 1675, Mehmed IV's sons Mustafa II and Ahmed III were circumcised and his daughter Hatice Sultan was married. The empire celebrated it with Famous Edirne Festival to mark the occasion. Silahdar Findikli Mehmed Aga described Mehmed as a medium-sized, stocky, white-skinned, sun-burnt face, with a sparse beard, leaning forward from the waist up because he rode a lot.

After the Second Battle of Mohács in 1687, the Ottoman Empire fell into deep crisis. There was a mutiny among the Ottoman troops. The commander and Grand Vizier, Sarı Süleyman Pasha, became frightened that he would be killed by his own troops and fled from his command, first to Belgrade and then to Istanbul. When the news of the defeat and the mutiny arrived in Istanbul in early September, Abaza Siyavuş Pasha was appointed as the commander and soon afterward as the Grand Vizier. However, before he could take over his command, the whole Ottoman Army had disintegrated and the Ottoman household troops (Janissaries and sipahis) started to return to their base in Istanbul under their own lower-rank officers. Sarı Suleiman Pasha was executed, and Sultan Mehmed IV appointed the commander of Istanbul Straits, Köprülü Fazıl Mustafa Pasha, as the Grand Vizier's regent in Istanbul. Fazıl Mustafa made consultations with the leaders of the army that existed and the other leading Ottoman statesmen.

After these, on 8 November 1687, it was decided to depose Sultan Mehmed IV and to enthrone his brother Suleiman II as the new Sultan. Mehmed was deposed by the combined forces of Janissaries and Sekbans commanded by Osman Pasha. Mehmed was then imprisoned in Topkapı Palace. However, he was permitted to leave the Palace from time to time, as he died in Edirne Palace in 1693. He was buried in Turhan Sultan's tomb, near his mother's mosque in Constantinople. In 1691, a couple of years before his death, a plot was discovered in which the senior clerics of the empire planned to reinstate Mehmed on the throne in response to the ill health and imminent death of his successor, Suleiman II.

== Family ==
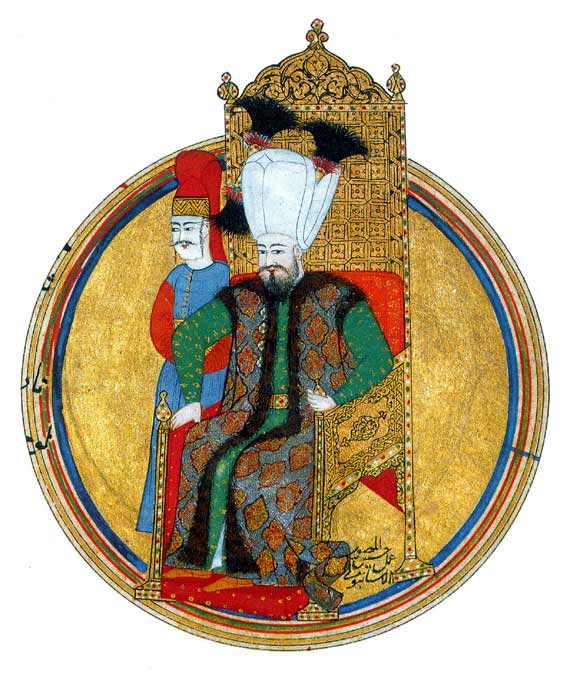
Miniature of Mehmed IV, between 1674 and 1683

=== Consorts ===
Mehmed IV had an Haseki Sultan and several secondary concubines. However, the lack of information about them (except for his Haseki) and the relatively low number of children has created controversy over the actual existence of some of them.

Mehmed IV's known consorts are:

- Emetullah Rabia Gülnuş Sultan. Of Greek origin, her real name was Evmania/Eugenie Voria. She was the first concubine of Mehmed IV and the most beloved, his Haseki and mother of two sultans. She became particularly famous for her many travels, first accompanying the sultan and then her two sons wherever they went. The Yeni Valide mosque was built in her honor by their son Ahmed III.
- Afife Hatun. Also called Afife Kadın, she was Mehmed's second favorite and a poet. During the period of confinement in the Eski Saray after the deposition of Mehmed IV, she wrote verses dedicated to his pain and to that of Gülnuş, who "screamed until she hurt her lungs", while Mehmed in his room, wept for not being able to console her. Mehmed dedicated some poems to her, also.
- Gülnar Hatun. Also called Gülnar Kadın. Her existence is controversial, with some historians speculating that she may be Gülnuş herself, whose name was misspelled by some.
- Nevruz Hatun. Also known as Nevruz Kadın, she founded a school in the Süleymaniye neighborhood.
- Güneş Hatun. Her existence is controversial, with some historians speculating that she may be Gülnuş herself, whose name was misspelled by some.
- Gülbeyaz Hatun. The mother of a daughter; according to historical records, she was killed out of jealousy by Gülnuş, who either threw her off a cliff or strangled her to death. Her existence remains a subject of debate, though some sources suggest she may have been a concubine who predated Gülnuş's arrival.
- Hatice Hatun. She was killed by "Güneş Hatun" (Gülnuş herself according to some historians). Her existence is controversial.
- Cihanşah Hatun
- Dürriye Hatun
- Kaniye Hatun
- Rukiye Hatun
- Siyavuş Hatun
- Rabia Hatun. Also called Rabia Kadin. Uncertain existence, she was a poet. Could be a pen name of Afife Hatun; or refer to Gülnuş Sultan, whose second name was indeed Rabia.

=== Sons ===
Mehmed IV had at least five sons:

- Mustafa II (2 June 1664 – 29 December 1703) – with Gülnuş Sultan. 22nd Sultan of the Ottoman Empire
- Şehzade Ibrahim (c. 1665 – 1666) – with Afife Kadin.
- Ahmed III (31 December 1673 – 1 July 1736) – with Gülnuş Sultan. He was born in Bulgaria, first sultan to be born out of Turkey since the time of Suleiman I. 23rd Sultan of the Ottoman Empire
- Şehzade Bayezid (31 December 1678 – January 1679) – with Rabia Kadin, buried in Sultan Mustafa I Mausoleum, Hagia Sophia)
- Şehzade Süleyman (13 February 1681 – 1685) – with Siyavus Kadin.

=== Daughters ===
Mehmed IV had at at least eight daughters:

- Hatice Sultan (c. 1660 – 5 July 1743), – with Gülnuş Sultan, She married twice and had five sons and a daughter.
- Ümmi Sultan. She died in infancy.
- Fülane Sultan (Edirne, 1668? - ?). She married Kasım Mustafa Pasha, Sanjak-bey of Edirne, in 1687.
- Ayşe Sultan (c. 1668 – unknown) – with Gülnuş Sultan. Nicknamed Küçük Sultan, that means "little princess".
- Ümmügülsüm Sultan (c. 1678 – 9 May 1720) – with Gülnuş Sultan. Also called Ümmi Sultan. She was the favorite niece of her uncle Ahmed II, who after the deposition of her father treated her as his daughter, so much so that he kept her at court with him, unlike her sisters. She married once and had three daughters. She was buried in the Yeni Cami Mosque.
- Fatma Emetullah Sultan (unknown — 29 May 1700) – with Gülnuş Sultan. She married twice and had two daughters.
- Fülane Sultan - alleged daughter with Gülbeyaz Hatun.
- Gevherhan Sultan, also called Gevher Sultan.

== See also ==
- Köprülü era
- Kösem Sultan
- Çınar incident
- Austro-Turkish War (1663–1664)

Mehmed IV House of Osman Born: 2 January 1642 Died: 6 January 1693[aged 51]
Regnal titles
Preceded by Ibrahim	Sultan of the Ottoman Empire; 8 August 1648 – 8 November 1687 with Kösem Sultan (1648–1651); Turhan Hatice Sultan (1651–1656)	Succeeded by Suleiman II
Sunni Islam titles
Preceded by Ibrahim	Caliph of the Ottoman Caliphate; 8 August 1648 – 8 November 1687	Succeeded by Suleiman II
