= Atikali =

Neighborhood in Fatih, Istanbul, Turkey

- Neighbourhood
- Location in Turkey Atikali (Istanbul)
- Coordinates: 41°01′27″N 28°56′43″E
- Country: Turkey
- Province: Istanbul
- District: Fatih
- Population (2024): 13,152
- Time zone: UTC+3 (TRT)

Atikali is a neighbourhood on the European side of Istanbul, Turkey, in the municipality and district of Fatih.

== Geography ==
Atikali is bordered by the neighbourhoods of Derviş Ali to the north, Balat to the west, Ali Kuşçu to the east and Hırkaişerif to the south, all within the Fatih district of Istanbul.

== History ==
The neighbourhood was officially formed on 22 March 2008 by merging the former Beyceğiz and Kocadede mahalleleri under Law No. 5747 on administrative reorganisation. It takes its name from Hadım Atik Ali Pasha, who served twice as Grand Vizier under Sultan Bayezid II in the early 16th century.

== Demographics ==
As of 31 December 2024, Atikali had a population of 13,152 inhabitants (6,390 males and 6,762 females), according to the Address‑based population registration system (ADNKS) of TÜİK.

== Architecture and landmarks ==
Much of Atikali retains the character of a traditional Ottoman mahalle, with many 2–3‑storey wooden houses featuring projecting oriel windows. The neighbourhood is also home to the Gazi Atik Ali Pasha Mosque (1496–1497), built by the same grand vizier after whom the neighbourhood is named.

== Transportation ==
Atikali is served by several bus lines (44T, 46H) operated by Istanbul Büyükşehir Belediyesi (İBB). The nearest tram stop is Balat Tramvay Durağı on the T5 line, approximately 800 m west of the neighbourhood centre.
