= London Protocol (1828) =

1828 establishment of an autonomous Greek state by the UK, France, and Russia

The London Protocol of 16 November 1828 was an agreement among the three Great Powers (Great Britain, France and Russia), which established the creation of an internally autonomous, but tributary Greek state under Ottoman suzerainty.

As a result of the Greek War of Independence, which had begun in 1821, and the Great Powers' intervention in the conflict after the Treaty of London in the Battle of Navarino (1827), the creation of some form of Greek state in southern Greece had become certain. In 1827, the Greek Third National Assembly entrusted the governance of the fledgling nation to Ioannis Kapodistrias, who arrived in Greece in January 1828. Alongside his efforts to lay the foundations for a modern state, Kapodistrias undertook negotiations with the Great Powers as to the extent and constitutional status of the new Greek state, especially during the Poros Conference of the Great Powers' ambassadors in September 1828.

Although the ambassadors recommended a broad territorial basis for the new Greek state, in November 1828, disregarding the ambassadors' recommendations, the Great Powers agreed on the first London Protocol, which created an autonomous Greek state, which would be tributary to the Sultan and limited to the Peloponnese (Morea) and the Cyclades islands. This left out Central Greece, Crete, and other islands which had participated in the Greek uprising and/or were at the time under Greek control.

In the event, the Protocol was amended on 22 March 1829 by the signature of the second London Protocol, which largely accepted the Poros Conference's recommendations.
