= Battle of Koronisia (1829) =

1829 battle of the Greek War of Independence

- Part of the Greek War of Independence
Date	5 March 1829
Location	Koronisia, Arta, Epirus, Rumelia Eyalet, Ottoman Empire
Result	Greek victory

Belligerents
Greek revolutionaries	Ottoman Empire

Commanders and leaders
Richard Church; Athanasios Koutsonikas	Reşid Mehmed Pasha

The Battle of Koronisia or Kyronisia was a military conflict of the Greek War of Independence with a victorious outcome for the Greeks.

== The development of events ==
On March 5, 1829, Vonitsa became Greek again. This again mobilized Mehmet Resit Pasha Kütahı, a general with enormous prestige, now the Sultan's commander-in-chief, who was in Ioannina. He was ordered to quickly drown Roumeli in blood so that he could then take over as head of the Ottoman troops on the Russian-Turkish front.

Commander-in-Chief George assigned the task of stopping Kütahı to the Souliotes millenary under Athanasios Koutsonikas, with the objective of closing in on the islet of Koronisia (an islet in the Amvrakikos Gulf in the wider area of Arta, opposite Preveza and Vonitsa) in the Ottoman passage and preventing Kütahı, who had been undefeated until then, from crossing into Roumeli. The Turkish troops were led by Kütahı himself. However, he failed. On 22 March 1829, the London Protocol was signed.
