= London Protocol (1829) =

Amendment to the first London Protocol (1828) on the independence of Greece

The London Protocol of 22 March 1829 was an agreement between the three Great Powers (Britain, France and Russia), which amended the first London Protocol on the creation of an internally autonomous, but tributary Greek state under Ottoman suzerainty.

As a result of the Greek War of Independence, which had begun in 1821, and the Great Powers' intervention in the conflict in the Battle of Navarino (1827), the creation of some form of Greek state in southern Greece had become certain. In 1827, the Greek Third National Assembly entrusted the governance of the fledgling nation to Ioannis Kapodistrias, who arrived in Greece in January 1828. Alongside his efforts to lay the foundations for a modern state, Kapodistrias undertook negotiations with the Great Powers as to the extent and constitutional status of the new Greek state, especially during the Poros Conference of the Great Powers' ambassadors in September 1828. In November 1828, disregarding the ambassadors' recommendations, the Great Powers agreed on the first London Protocol, which created an autonomous Greek state encompassing the Peloponnese (Morea) and the Cyclades islands only.

On 22 March 1829, the British Foreign Minister, George Hamilton-Gordon, 4th Earl of Aberdeen, and the envoys of France and Russia, Jules de Polignac and Christoph von Lieven, signed the second London Protocol, which largely accepted the recommendations of the Poros Conference. According to the protocol, Greece would become a separate state enjoying complete autonomy under the rule of a hereditary Christian prince to be selected by the Powers, but recognize the suzerainty of the Ottoman Sultan and pay an annual tribute of 1.5 million Turkish piastres. The borders of the new state would run along the line of the Gulf of Arta in the west to the Pagasetic Gulf in the east, thereby including the Peloponnese and Continental Greece, as well as the Cyclades, but neither Crete nor other Aegean islands like Samos which had played a major part in the War of Independence and were still under Greek control.

The Ottoman Empire was forced to acknowledge the protocol in the Treaty of Adrianople, which concluded the Russo-Turkish War of 1828–29, but soon after this, the Powers began to turn towards complete independence for Greece, which was recognized in the London Protocol of 3 February 1830.
