= Conference of Poros =

1828 meeting to determine the borders of the First Hellenic Republic

The Conference of Poros was a meeting held in 1828 by British, French and Russian diplomats to determine the borders of independent Greece.

== Background ==
In 1821, the Greeks had revolted against the Ottoman Empire. As the Greek plight attracted much sympathy, in 1827 the British, French and Russian fleets had destroyed the Ottoman and Egyptian fleets at the Battle of Navarino. After the battle, the London conference of 1832, consisting of the British Foreign Secretary and the French and Russian ambassadors, met to determine what would be the borders of Greece once independence was gained from the Ottoman Empire.

== The Conference ==
Unable to reach an agreement in London, the British, French and Russian ambassadors to the Sublime Porte were instructed to meet on the island of Poros in September 1828 to resolve the problem. There were two main options:

- Greece to cover everything south of a line running from the Gulf of Volos up to Arta.
- Greece to consist of just the Peloponnese and everything north of the Isthmus of Corinth was to remain Ottoman.

There were also two more intermediate options between the two extremes. According to the memorandum presented by Ioannis Kapodistrias the northern Greek border should reach a line from Delvino to Thessaloniki or at least the most southern line from Preveza to Lamia. After much discussion, the three ambassadors reported that Greece should stretch from Arta to Gulf of Volos with the islands of Euboea and Samos, and possibly Crete included as well. The leading pro-Greek voice at the conference was Stratford Canning. The ambassadors all reported that this was the most defensible line possible and to just limit the Greek state to the Peloponnese would cause hundreds of thousands of Greeks to flee south, overwhelming the cash-strapped Greek state. The conference also concluded that Greece should be a monarchy.

== Result ==
The British prime minister, the Duke of Wellington, who was hostile to the whole idea of granting Greece independence, rejected the Conference's report, saying his aim "was not to conquer territory from the Porte, but to pacify a country in a state of insurrection". Wellington stated he wanted the Greek state to consist only of the Peloponnese with the rest of Greece remaining Ottoman. Britain, France and Russia accepted the Poros Conference's recommendations as the basis of negotiation only, which caused Canning to resign in disgust. The Sublime Porte still believed that the war could be won, and having had already rejected the demand for an armistice, likewise rejected the conference's recommendations. However, after being defeated in the Russo-Turkish War of 1828–29, the Ottomans were finally force to accept the idea of Greek independence. Under the terms of the Treaty of Adrianople, in September 1829, the Ottomans promised to accept whatever decision reached by the London Conference.

On 3 February 1830, the London Conference decided to offer Prince Leopold of Saxe-Coburg the Greek throne, with a border far short of what the Poros Conference had decided. This caused Leopold to decline the offer of the Greek throne on 21 May 1830, saying he would only accept a Greek throne with the borders agreed to at the Poros Conference.

== Sources and Further reading ==
- Anderson, M.S. The Eastern Question, 1774-1923: A Study in International Relations (1966) online
- Brewer, David The Greek War of Independence, London: Overlook Duckworth, 2011
- Crawley, Charles William. The Question of Greek Independence (Cambridge University Press, 2014).
