= Ivaz Mehmed Pasha =

Grand Vizier of the Ottoman Empire from 1739 to 1740

Hacı İvaz Mehmed Pasha

Grand Vizier of the Ottoman Empire
- In office 22 March 1739 – 23 June 1740
- Monarch: Mahmud I
- Preceded by: Yeğen Mehmed Pasha
- Succeeded by: Nişancı Ahmed Pasha

Personal details
- Died: 1743 Lepanto

Military service
- Allegiance: Ottoman Empire
- Battles/wars: Great Turkish War: Siege of Belgrade (1690); Austro-Russian–Turkish War (1735–39): Battle of Radujevac; Battle of Orșova (1738); Battle of Grocka; Capture of Belgrade (1739)

Ivaz Mehmed Pasha ("Mehmed Pasha the Replacement"; died 1743), also known as Hacı Ivaz Mehmed Pasha or Hacı Ivazzade Mehmed Pasha, was an 18th-century Ottoman grand vizier and provincial governor.

== Early life ==
Ivaz Mehmed Pasha was of Albanian origin. His father Nasrullah was from Jagodina (in Serbia). His family was among the group of families known as evlad-ı fatihan, i.e., descendants of the early Ottoman soldiers in Rumelia (southeastern Europe). Upon the recommendation of his father, he worked in the courts of several statesmen. During the Great Turkish War (also known as the War of the Holy League), he was in the battle front near Belgrade (in modern Serbia). Before the war was over, he traveled to Jeddah (in modern Saudi Arabia) as the chamberlain (kethüda). In the 1730s, he came to the capital Istanbul as the chief of the custıms. In 1735, he was promoted to be the vizier and appointed as the governor of Vidin (in modern Bulgaria). At the outbreak of the Austro-Russian–Turkish War (1735–39), he fought against Austrians with a relatively small provincial force. His efforts proved to be valuable to the Ottoman cause. After the main Ottoman army arrived at the front, he was one of the commanders of the army.

== As a grand vizier ==
On 22 March 1739, he was appointed as the Grand Vizier, the highest post in the empire next to that of the sultan. On 21 July 1739, he commanded the Ottoman army in the Battle of Grocka where he defeated the Austrians, commanded by Count of Wallis. After the battle, he laid siege to and captured Belgrade, and by the consequent Treaty of Belgrade, he was able to capture the city. Although he returned to Istanbul as a victorious commander, he wasn't as successful in civil administration. He was inefficient during the great fires of Istanbul and a rebellion, which had to be subdued by the other statesmen of the empire. As a result, the sultan dismissed him on 23 June 1740.

== Later years ==
In his later years, he was a provincial governor. In just three years' span, he was sequentially appointed to so many districts in rapid succession that in most cases, he had to leave for the next place of duty before he could even be inaugurated for his previous post. These posts were provincial governorship of Habesh Eyalet (in east Africa), Sanjak of Chania (in Crete), Sanjak of Salonica (modern Greece), Bosnia Eyalet (modern Bosnia and Herzegovina), Sanjak of Eğriboz (island of Euboea, modern Greece) and Sanjak of Inebahti (based in Lepanto, modern Greece). In 1743, he died in Lepanto.

His son, Ivazzade Halil Pasha, also became a Grand Vizier.

== See also ==
- List of Ottoman grand viziers

Political offices
Preceded by Yeğen Mehmed Pasha	Grand Vizier of the Ottoman Empire; 17 March 1739 – 22 June 1740	Succeeded by Nişancı Ahmed Pasha
