= Treaty of Niš (1739) =

Russo-Turkish peace treaty

Main theater of the Russo-Turkish War (1735–1739)

The Treaty of Niš was a peace treaty signed on 3 October 1739 in Niš (nowadays in Serbia), by the Ottoman Empire and the Russian Empire, to end the Russo-Turkish War (1735–1739). It was preceded by the preliminary Russo-Turkish peace treaty, signed through French mediation on 18 September 1739 in Belgrade, while the peace arrangements were finalized by the treaty of Niš on 3 October.

== History ==
On 18 September 1739, the Treaty of Belgrade was signed by the Ottoman Empire and the Habsburg monarchy, thus ending the Habsburg participation in the war. On the same day, through the mediation of French ambassador, marquis Louis Sauveur de Villeneuve, a separate preliminary peace treaty was signed, also in Belgrade, aimed to end the war between Russia and the Ottomans. Since the Russo-Turkish treaty was signed through mediation, its viability depended on official acceptance by the Russian court. At that time, commander of advancing Russian forces, that had successfully captured Moldavia, field marshal Burkhard Christoph von Münnich was not included in negotiations, nor informed of the outcome of French mediation. In spite of that, negotiations proceeded further, and on 3 October (1739) the final Russo-Turkish peace treaty was signed in Niš, also through French mediation. Ultimately, the Habsburg monarchy's withdrawal forced the Russian court to accept both treaties on Ottoman conditions. Manstein, meanwhile, blamed Russian acquiescence to the treaty on concerns about impending war with Sweden and France's supposed implacable hostility to Russia. After the formal ratification by empress Anna of Russia, diplomatic instruments were exchanged and the final convention was signed in Constantinople on 28 December 1739, also through the French mediation, thus formally concluding the war.

== Terms ==
- Azov was completely demolished, and its territory became a neutral buffer zone between the two empires.
- Each side was allowed to build one new fortress, Russia on the Don River island at Cherkassy and the Ottomans on the Kuban frontier toward Azov.
- Russia was forbidden from rebuilding the fortress of Taganrog or maintaining a fleet or any other ships in the Black Sea.
- Merchants from both empires were allowed to trade freely in each other's territories, but Russian trade in the Black Sea had to be conducted on Ottoman ships.
- Greater and Lesser Kabardia remained independent buffer zones between the two empires.

== See also ==
- List of treaties
- List of treaties of the Ottoman Empire

== Sources ==
- Ćirković, Sima (2004). The Serbs. Malden: Blackwell Publishing. ISBN 978-1-4051-4291-5.
- Dvoichenko-Markov, Demetrius (1967). "Lomonosov and the Capture of the Fortress of Khotin in 1739". Balkan Studies. 8 (1): 65–74. Archived from the original on 2020-03-19.
- Hochedlinger, Michael (2013). Austria's Wars of Emergence: War, State and Society in the Habsburg Monarchy, 1683–1797. London & New York: Routledge. ISBN 978-1-317-88793-5.
- Mikaberidze, Alexander, ed. (2011). Conflict and Conquest in the Islamic World: A Historical Encyclopedia. Vol. 2. Santa Barbara: ABC-CLIO. ISBN 978-1-59884-336-1.
- Roider, Karl A. (1972a). The Reluctant Ally: Austria's Policy in the Austro-Turkish War, 1737–1739. Baton Rouge: Louisiana State University Press. ISBN 978-0-8071-0237-4.
- Roider, Karl A. (1972b). "The Perils of Eighteenth-Century Peacemaking: Austria and the Treaty of Belgrade, 1739". Central European History. 5 (3): 195–207. doi:10.1017/S0008938900015478. JSTOR 4545635.
- Stavrianos, Leften (2000) [1958]. The Balkans Since 1453. London: Hurst. ISBN 978-1-85065-551-0.
- Shaw, Stanford J. (1976). History of the Ottoman Empire and Modern Turkey, Volume 1: Empire of the Gazis: The Rise and Decline of the Ottoman Empire, 1280–1808. Cambridge University Press.
- Hurewitz, J. C. (1956). Diplomacy in the Near and Middle East: A Documentary Record, Volume I, 1535–1914.
- Davies, Brian L. (2011). Empire and Military Revolution in Eastern Europe: Russia's Turkish Wars in the Eighteenth Century.
- Laugier, Marc-Antoine (1768). Histoire des négociations pour la paix conclue a Belgrade, le 18 septembre 1739: entre l'empereur, la Russie & la Porte ottomane, par la médiation, & sous la garantie de la France (in French). Vol. 2.
