= Louis Sauveur Villeneuve =

Louis-Sauveur de Villeneuve (6 August 1675, Aix-en-Provence - 18 July 1745, Marseille) was French noble and diplomat. He was marquess of Forcalqueiret and baron of Sainte-Anastasie, who served as ambassador to the Ottoman Empire from 1728 to 1741.

During the Russo-Austro-Turkish War (1735–1739), Villeneuve was engaged in negotiations between warring parties, acting as a neutral mediator, but trying to secure an outcome that would be beneficial for French interests. Hoping to stop or reverse further expansion of the Russian Empire and the Habsburg Monarchy towards Ottoman territories, Villeneuve was hoping to achieve the status quo outcome in the Russo-Turkish conflict, and he also took advantage of unexpected Habsburg defeats in the final stages of the war, advocating for cession of several Habsburg regions to the Ottomans. He played prominent role in negotiations that took place in Belgrade and Niš, from August to October 1739. He persuaded Habsburg negotiator Wilhelm Reinhard von Neipperg to accept unfavorable preliminary agreement on 1 September, and acted as a co-signator of the final Treaty of Belgrade (18 September) that ended the Austro-Turkish war. Using mediating powers granted to him by the Russian government, Villeneuve also signed the preliminary Russo-Turkish agreement (also on 18 September, in Belgrade), and was instrumental in concluding the final Treaty of Niš (3 October) that ended the Russo-Turkish war.

During his service de Villeneuve made a point to learn more about the Ottoman madrasa system, the religious educational institution that had been operating in the Empire continuously since its establishment in 1330 by Orhan Gazi. Submitting the request to the Ottoman Foreign Ministry, de Villeneuve was presented with the Seven Stars curriculum (Kevakib-i Seb'a). This curriculum, of unknown authorship, expressed regrets that Islamic scholars had not made greater inroads into Christian countries where they were widely regarded as ignorant and superstitious. The Seven Stars curriculum presented to de Villeneuve aimed to overcome language barriers and improve the image of the Islamic world in the West.

== See also ==
- Franco-Ottoman alliance
- Princess Hatice
- Capture of Belgrade (1739)

== Sources ==
- Regele, Oskar (1954). "Die Schuld des Grafen Reinhard Wilhelm von Neipperg am Belgrader Frieden 1739 und an der Niederlage bei Mollwitz 1741". Mitteilungen des Österreichischen Staatsarchivs. 7: 373–398.
- Roider, Karl A. (1972a). The Reluctant Ally: Austria's Policy in the Austro-Turkish War, 1737–1739. Baton Rouge: Louisiana State University Press.
- Roider, Karl A. (1972b). "The Perils of Eighteenth-Century Peacemaking: Austria and the Treaty of Belgrade, 1739". Central European History. 5 (3): 195–207.
- Stavrianos, Leften (2000) [1958]. The Balkans Since 1453. London: Hurst.
- Sugar, Peter F. (1996) [1977]. Southeastern Europe under Ottoman Rule, 1354-1804. Seattle: University of Washington Press.
- Tupetz, Theodor (1878). "Der Türkenfeldzug von 1739 und der Friede zu Belgrad". Historische Zeitschrift. 40: 1–51.
