= Wilhelm Reinhard von Neipperg =

Austrian general (1684–1774)

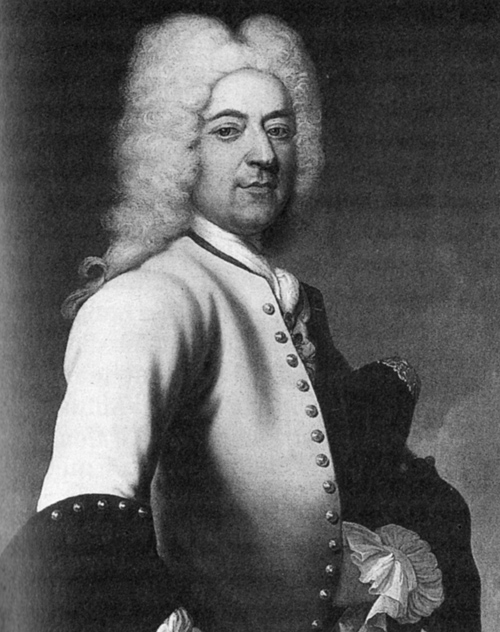
Wilhelm Reinhard von Neipperg.

Wilhelm Reinhard von Neipperg (27 May 1684 – 26 May 1774) was an aristocrat, count, and general who held several commanding posts in military forces of the Habsburg Monarchy.

== Biography ==
Born in Schwaigern, the residence of the Lordship, from 1766 County of Neipperg, he descended from an ancient comital family, Neipperg (noble family) from Swabia. His father, Baron Eberhard Friedrich von Neipperg (1655–1725), was an Imperial field marshal. He spent his boyhood in Vienna and in 1702 joined the Imperial service. He was a Oberstleutnant in his father's regiment in 1709, and by 1715 was a colonel. He distinguished himself in the Austro-Turkish War (1716–1718) at the siege of Temesvar (1716) and at Belgrade in 1717.

After fighting against the Turks, he renounced his military career in order to attend to the education of Prince Francis of Lorraine, the future Holy Roman Emperor. He was elevated to the rank of count in 1726.

During the Austro-Turkish War (1737–1739), Neipperg returned to the army, and was with Fieldmarshal Wallis at the Battle of Grocka (21–22 July, 1739) against the Turks. Already on 31 July, imperial government in Vienna decided to relieve Wallis of his previously granted powers to negotiate with the Ottomans. Those powers were transferred to Neipperg. On 10 August, the government composed new instructions, that were sent by the Emperor to Neipperg on 11 August. Arriving in Belgrade with imperial instructions on 16 August, Neipperg proceeded to the camp of the Grand Vizier on 18 August. There he found himself increasingly isolated, and dependent on the French mediator Louis Sauveur, Marquis de Villeneuve. On 1 September, Neipperg agreed to signe a preliminary peace agreement with the Ottomans, and dispatched the news to the Emperor on the next day. Neipperg's report arrived to Vienna on 7 September, provoking outrage, since it became obvious that he signed the agreement not knowing that already on 31 August, the Emperor sent him new instructions, an action that was followed by the governments decision to revoke his negotiating powers (3 September). On 5 September, the Emperor sent another letter to Neipperg, informing him of the end of his diplomatic mission, while still not knowing that the preliminary treaty was already signed. Only upon return to Belgrade from the Grand Vizier's camp, Neipperg became aware of those new instructions and consequent decisions, realizing that he acted without valid negotiating powers, but it was to late for reversal. On 18 September, the final peace Treaty of Belgrade was signed. Soon after that, both Neipperg and Wallis were arrested and accused for the unfavorable outcome of negotiations. Only after the Emperor's death in 1740 they were pardoned.

Two years later, during the War of Austrian Succession, he commanded the Austrian army which was defeated at the Battle of Mollwitz by Frederick II of Prussia. Nonetheless he became an Imperial field marshal later that year.

His daughter, Maria Wilhelmina von Neipperg, became mistress of Francis I, Holy Roman Emperor. His grandson Adam Albert von Neipperg married Napoleon's widow Marie Louise.

He died at Vienna in 1774, just one day before his 90th birthday.

== Sources ==
- Aksan, Virginia H. (2013) [2007]. Ottoman Wars, 1700-1870: An Empire Besieged. London & New York: Routledge. ISBN 978-1-317-88403-3.
- Hochedlinger, Michael (2013) [2003]. Austria's Wars of Emergence: War, State and Society in the Habsburg Monarchy, 1683–1797. London & New York: Routledge. ISBN 978-1-317-88793-5.
- Ingrao, Charles W. (2000) [1994]. The Habsburg Monarchy, 1618–1815 (2nd ed.). Cambridge: Cambridge University Press. ISBN 978-0-521-78505-1.
- Jones, Archer, The Art of War in the Western World, University of Illinois Press, 1987.
- Regele, Oskar (1954). "Die Schuld des Grafen Reinhard Wilhelm von Neipperg am Belgrader Frieden 1739 und an der Niederlage bei Mollwitz 1741". Mitteilungen des Österreichischen Staatsarchivs. 7: 373–398.
- Roider, Karl A. (1972a). The Reluctant Ally: Austria's Policy in the Austro-Turkish War, 1737–1739. Baton Rouge: Louisiana State University Press. ISBN 978-0-8071-0237-4.
- Roider, Karl A. (1972b). "The Perils of Eighteenth-Century Peacemaking: Austria and the Treaty of Belgrade, 1739". Central European History. 5 (3): 195–207. doi:10.1017/S0008938900015478. JSTOR 4545635.
- Roider, Karl A. Jr. (1982). Austria's Eastern Question, 1700-1790. Princeton University Press. ISBN 978-1-4008-5669-5.
- Tupetz, Theodor (1878). "Der Türkenfeldzug von 1739 und der Friede zu Belgrad". Historische Zeitschrift. 40: 1–51. doi:10.1524/hzhz.1878.40.jg.1.
- Wheatcroft, Andrew (2008). The Enemy at the Gate: Habsburgs, Ottomans, and the Battle for Europe. London: Bodley Head Random House. ISBN 978-0-224-07364-6.
