= Peter Czartan =

Claimed supercentenarian

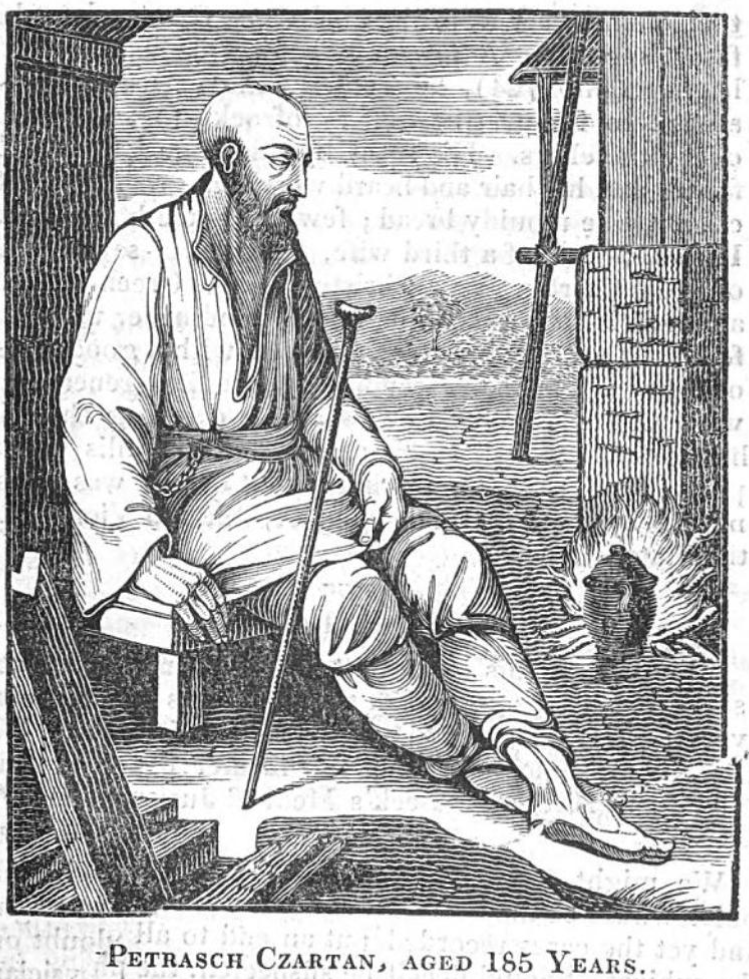
- Portrait of Czartan taken by the count of Wallis
- Born: 1539 (unconfirmed); Rofrosh, Eastern Hungarian Kingdom
- Died: 1724 (aged 184–185); Belgrade, Kingdom of Serbia
- Spouse: ≥3
- Children: ≥2

Peter Czartan was an 18th-century man in the Kingdom of Hungary who was recorded by writers in the 19th century to have lived to the age of 184 or 185 years.

== Biography ==
Czartan was allegedly born in 1539 in the village of Rofrosh (or Kofrock), which was close to Timișoara, in the Eastern Hungarian Kingdom (now Romania). He grew up in a Greek Orthodox family, and would have been 13 years old during the Ottoman conquering of Timișoara in 1552, where he was said to have looked after his father's cattle. Prior to his death, he was visited by George Olivier, count of Wallis, who "took a likeness" to him, according to a letter written to the States General of the United Netherlands dated January 29th, 1724. The alleged dialogue of their conversation records a gift being given by the count to Czartan. He also took a portrait of him, which survives.

He was a deeply religious man, who strictly observed all required days of fasting. He had red hair and his beard was described as "greenish-white" and "the color of bread mould". He supposedly was able, in his later years, to carry his descendants around in his arms. He had milk, kolach, and brandy as major staples of his diet, and he had few teeth left.

Czartan died in Belgrade in 1724, and was, at the time, survived by great-great grandchildren. His son supposedly lived to the age of at least 97, and had been born to his 3rd wife.

== Criticism of claims ==
The original claim of Czartan's advanced age came from Bolle Willum Luxdorph's Icones Longaevorum, which paired him with a couple, John (Janos) and Sarah Rovin, whom were claimed to have lived to the ages of 172 and 164, respectively. As early as 1880, groups of researchers & medical professionals cast doubt on the alleged advanced age of Czartan. Hungary first started to utilize parish records of baptisms in 1515, and use was not widespread by the time of Czartan's birth in 1539, so verification of a potential 1539 birth for a peasant would be unlikely.
