= Siege of Belgrade (1739) =

1739 recapture of the Habsburg-ruled city of Belgrade by the Ottoman Empire

- Part of the Russo-Turkish War (1735–1739)
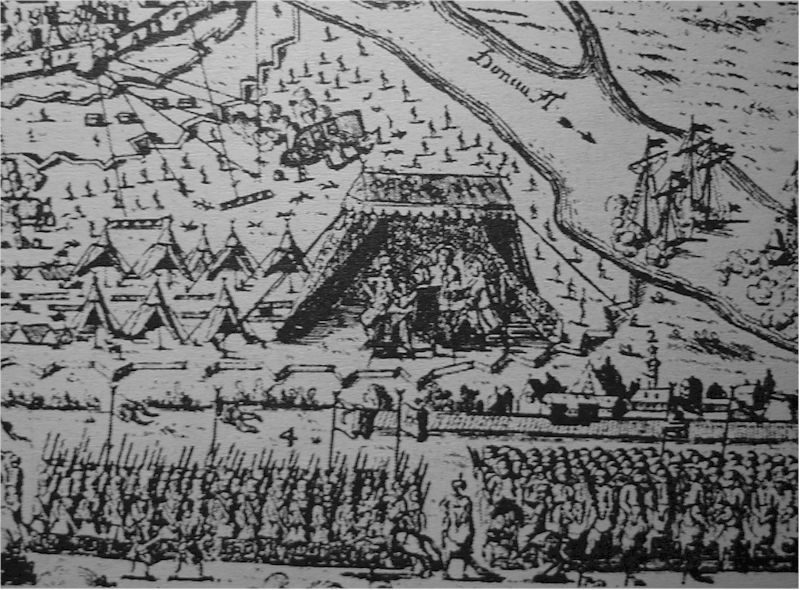
- Signing of Treaty of Belgrade, 1739
Date	July – 18 September 1739
Location	Belgrade 44°48′N 20°28′E
Result	Ottoman victory
Territorial changes	The Ottoman army captured Belgrade in 1739

Belligerents
Ottoman Empire	Habsburg Austria

Commanders and leaders
Ivaz Mehmed Pasha; Hekimoğlu Ali Pasha	Count Wallis

Strength
Unknown	Unknown

Casualties and losses
Unknown	Heavy

The Siege of Belgrade saw the recapture of Belgrade (بلغراد:Ottoman Turkish/capital of modern Serbia) by the Ottoman Empire in 1739.

== Background ==
According to the Treaty of Pruth signed in 1711 between the Ottoman Empire and the Russian Empire, the Russians had stipulated to stop interfering in the affairs of the Polish–Lithuanian Commonwealth. In the War of the Polish Succession (1733–1738), Habsburg Austria and the Russian Empire were allies. The Ottomans saw this alliance as a violation of the treaty and engaged in a war against Russia. Being an ally of Russia, the Austrians also declared war on the Ottoman Empire in 1737. The Austrian army was defeated in two major battles, the Battle of Banja Luka and the Battle of Grocka, and had to fall back on Belgrade.

== Siege ==
The Ottoman Empire had first captured Belgrade in 1521 (the first campaign of Suleyman I), but lost it to Eugene of Savoy of Austria in 1717 (see siege of Belgrade (1717)). The Ottomans had since then been waiting for an opportunity to regain the city. After the battle of Grocka the grand vizier Ivaz Mehmed Pasha laid siege to Belgrade (July 1739). In August, Hekimoğlu Ali Pasha (former grand vizier) joined him from the western front, a Bosnian militia also took part in the attack. After a siege of 51 days Count Wallis, the Austrian commander, ordered the burning of the Danubean fleet under his command and sued for peace.

== Peace talks ==
During the peace talks in Belgrade, Wilhelm Reinhard von Neipperg represented Austria, while Ottoman delegates including Mektupçu Ragıp (future grand vizier Koca Ragıp) represented the Ottoman Empire. Changing the borders caused no big problem; Austria agreed to cede territories to the Ottoman side. The major issue, however, was the future of Belgrade. The earliest Austrian offer was to keep Belgrade in return for the territories ceded to Ottoman side, which the Ottoman representatives refused. The second offer of the Austrian side was to cede Belgrade on the condition that the fortifications were to be demolished. Ivaz Mehmed Pasha also refused this offer. Negotiations broke down. Finally, Louis Sauveur Villeneuve, the French ambassador to the Ottoman Empire proposed a compromise in which only the former Ottoman fortification would be kept. Both sides agreed on the proposal and the treaty was signed on 18 September 1739.

== Aftermath ==
Except for a brief occupation during the Austro-Turkish War (1787–1791) the Austrians were never able to capture Belgrade. The Ottomans kept the city up to the Serbian Uprising. Until 1878, Belgrade was a city of semi-independent Serbia under Ottoman suzerainty. Serbia gained full independence by the Treaty of Berlin (1878).

== Sources ==
- Bataković, Dušan T., ed. (2005). Histoire du peuple serbe [History of the Serbian People] (in French). Lausanne: L’Age d’Homme.
- Ćirković, Sima (2004). The Serbs. Malden: Blackwell Publishing.
- Hochedlinger, Michael (2013). Austria's Wars of Emergence: War, State and Society in the Habsburg Monarchy, 1683–1797. London & New York: Routledge.
- Kurtaran, Uğur (2018). "Ottoman-Austria border determination works and newly determined borders according to the treaty of Belgrade of 1739". Belgrade 1521-1867. Belgrade: The Institute of History. pp. 169–192.
- Oruç, Hatice (2018). "Belgrade according to the 1741 dated tahrir defter on the Smederevo sanjak". Belgrade 1521-1867. Belgrade: The Institute of History. pp. 193–257.
