= Battle of Krajova =

1737 battle

Battle of Krajova (1737)
- Part of the Austro-Turkish War of 1737–1739
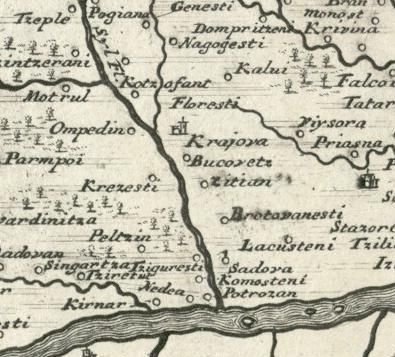
- Krajova in 18th century
Date	27 October 1737
Location	Craiova
Result	Ottoman victory

Belligerents
Habsburg monarchy	Ottoman Empire

Commanders and leaders
(Habsburg monarchy) Colonel Sallhausen (Habsburg monarchy) Major Baron von Zeblis	Hussein Agha; Sulieman Agha

Strength
600–800 men	Unknown

Casualties and losses
Heavy	Unknown

The Battle of Krajova was a military engagement between the Austrians stationed in Craiova and the Ottomans who attacked them. The Austrians withdrew but were attacked by the Ottomans, inflicting heavy losses on the retreating Austrians.

== Prelude ==
Austria joined war with Russia against the Ottomans in 1737. However, Austria proved to be no match for the well-prepared Ottomans. Austrians were forced to retreat from Banat and Serbia. In Oltenia, the Austrians did not have enough troops. The Austrian force, which was situated in Krajova, was led by Colonel Sallhausen. The Colonel had to retreat, and his withdrawal meant the end of the Banat of Krajova. The Ottoman governor of Vidin, Mohammad Pasha, dispatched Hussein Agha and the Miralem, Suleiman Agha, to Krajova.

== Battle ==
On October 27, 1737, the Ottomans suddenly attacked the Austrian force. The patrols, which the Colonel sent in the morning, were captured by the Ottomans, leaving the Austrians surprised. Major Baron von Zeblis immediately moved forward and found the Ottomans already arriving in the vicinity. Since it was difficult to defend Krajova with a small force of 600 or 800 men, they had to evacuate. The infantry evacuated, but the cavalry led by the Major remained behind to cover the retreat. The Major held the Ottomans for a long time enough but was forced to retreat due to heavy Ottoman onslaught.

At this time, the Janissaries advanced to the town, and the Major's forces were being heavily bombarded. The Austrians were forced to retreat to the town, and the situation involved street fighting. The cavalry managed to break their way out. Upon retreating, they found the infantry still in column behind the place, instead of having rushed to cross the plain to reach the forest half an hour away. They then began their march but were heavily attacked by the Ottomans; the Major still held out for the others to retreat. Meanwhile, terror had seized the infantry, which mostly consisted of recruits.

Resistance proved futile, and the heroic actions of the major ended in vain. The Austrians retreated towards Râmnicu Sărat.

== Sources ==
- Gustav Ritter Amon von Treuenfest (1892), History of the Imperial and Royal Bukovina Dragoon Regiment (In German).
- Joseph Freiherr von Hammer (1831), History of the Ottoman Empire: From Carlowicz to the Peace of Belgrade. 1699-1739 (In German).
- Nicolae Dobrescu (1906), History of the Romanian Church in Oltenia during the Austrian occupation (1716–1739) (In Romanian).
- József Bánlaky: Military History of the Hungarian Nation (MEK-OSZK), 0014/1149. The military operations of 1737.
