= George Olivier =

George Olivier may refer to:

- George Borg Olivier (1911–1980), Maltese statesman and politician
- George Olivier, count of Wallis (1671–1743), field marshal of Irish descent
