= Battle of Orșova (1738) =

- Part of the Austro-Turkish War of 1737–1739
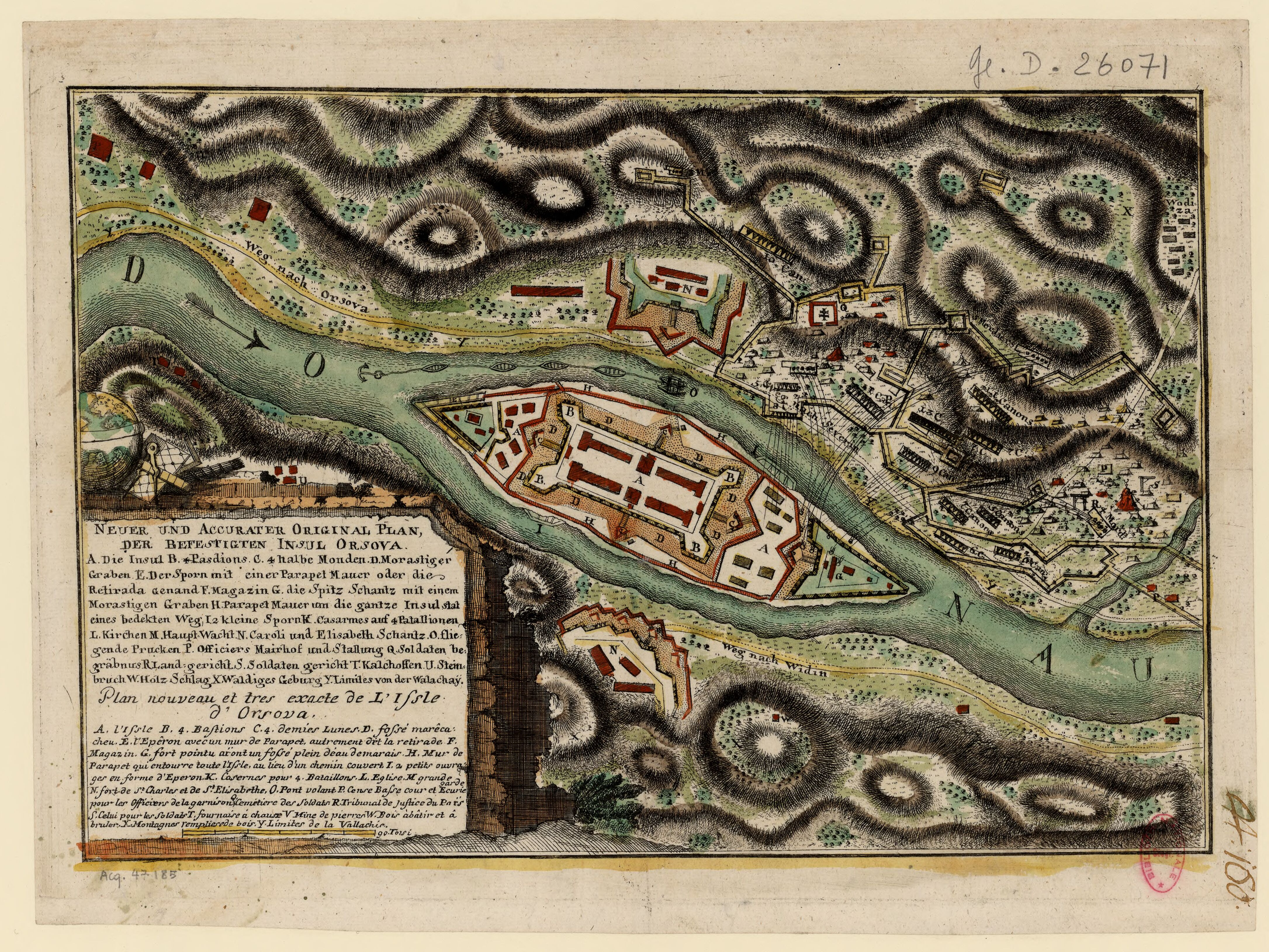
- Ada Kaleh island, where the Austrian garrison retreated after their loss at Orșova
Date	8 May 1738
Location	Orșova
Result	Ottoman victory

Belligerents
Habsburg monarchy	Ottoman Empire

Commanders and leaders
(Habsburg monarchy) Colonel Misserony †	Ivaz Mehmed Pasha

Strength
Garrison: 1 battalion Reinforcement: 430 cavalry	4,000–5,000 sipahis

Casualties and losses
Battle: 220 killed Siege: 100 killed	Unknown

The Battle of Orșova happened during the Austro-Turkish War of 1737–1739. The Ottomans defeated a relief Austrian force and captured Orșova in the end.

== Battle ==
After the recapture of Užice, the Ottomans began mobilizing large enough forces to capture the Danube region. On 2 May 1738, the governor of Vidin, Ivaz Mehmed Pasha, was instructed to attack with 20,000 soldiers on the Banat and seize Orşova. Then, a few days later, on 8 May 1738, a corps of 4,000–5,000 sipahi (sipahis) arrived at Orșova around 3 p.m. On hearing of the threat, the commander of Timișoara and Bánság, Wilhelm Reinhard von Neipperg, Count of Neipperg and Imperial Field Marshal, sent 22 battalions, 2 grenadier companies, and 2 close regiments to the aid of Orşova. Colonel Misserony, the commander of the reinforcements on the way, went in to meet the Ottomans with a force of 430 cavalry; however, unaware of the size of their forces, he was surrounded, and he and 220 of his men were killed on the battlefield. Soon after this victory, the Ottomans laid siege to Orșova, garrisoned by an Austrian battalion. The Ottomans stormed Orșova and captured it. The defenders suffered 100 deaths and were forced to retreat towards Ada Kaleh.
