= Treaty of Belgrade =

1739 treaty between Austria and the Ottomans

Belgrade peace
Treaty of Belgrade
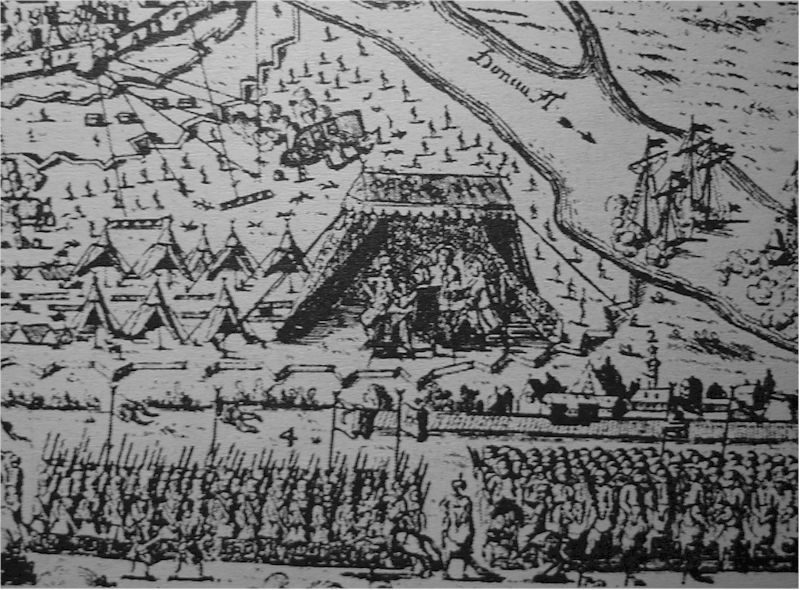
- Signed: 18 September 1739
- Location: Belgrade, Habsburg Kingdom of Serbia (now Serbia)
- Parties: Habsburg Monarchy; Ottoman Empire

The Treaty of Belgrade, also known as the Belgrade Peace, was a peace treaty between the Habsburg Monarchy and Ottoman Empire, that was signed on September 18, 1739, in Belgrade (modern Serbia), thus ending the Austro-Turkish War (1737–1739). Agreed territorial changes were substantial, and also favorable for the Ottoman side, since Habsburgs had to cede three regions: the Banat of Craiova (modern Oltenia), the Kingdom of Serbia with Belgrade, and Bosnian section of Posavina, thus placing the newly defined Habsburg-Ottoman border on the rivers Sava and Danube.

== Negotiations ==
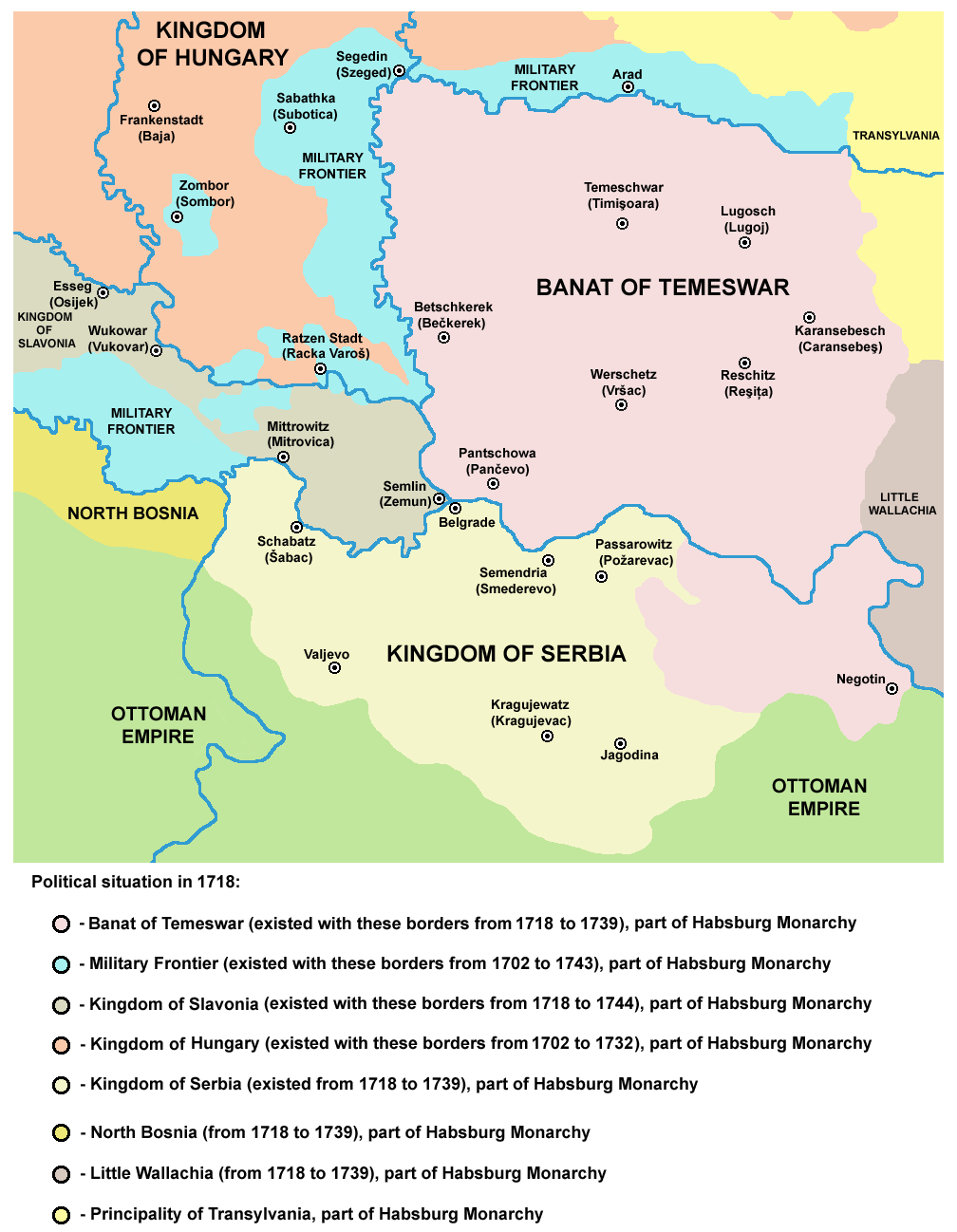
Political situation before the war 1737-1739

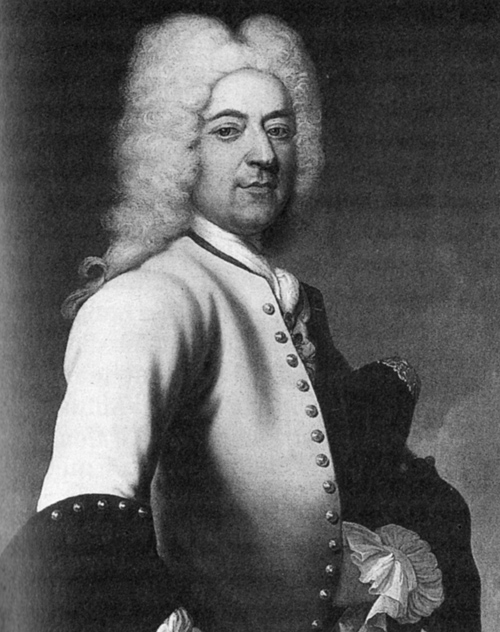
Count Wilhelm Reinhard von Neipperg, the chief Habsburg negotiator at the Belgrade peace talks

During the final stages of the Austro-Turkish War (1737–1739), the main Habsburg army, commanded by field marshal Wallis suffered a strategic defeat at the Battle of Grocka (21–22 July 1739), and retreated into the Belgrade Fortress, that was soon besieged by the Ottoman forces.

Already on 31 July, the government in Vienna decided to relieve Wallis of his previously granted powers to negotiate with the Ottomans. Those powers were transferred to count Neipperg. On 10 August, the imperial government composed new instructions, that were approved by the emperor Charles VI and sent to Neipperg on 11 August. Arriving in the still Habsburg-held Belgrade with imperial instructions on 16 August, Neipperg proceeded to the camp of the Grand Vizier on 18 August. There he found himself increasingly isolated, and dependent on the French mediator, marquis Louis Sauveur de Villeneuve. On 1 September, Neipperg agreed to sign a preliminary peace agreement with the Ottomans, and then dispatched the news to the Emperor on the next day. Neipperg's report arrived to Vienna on 7 September, provoking outrage, since it became obvious that he signed the agreement not knowing that already on 31 August, the Emperor sent him new instructions, an action that was followed by the governments decision to revoke Neipperg's negotiating powers (3 September). On 5 September, while still not knowing that the preliminary treaty was already signed, the Emperor sent a letter to Neipperg, informing him that his diplomatic mission has ended. Only upon return to Belgrade from the Grand Vizier's camp, Neipperg became aware of those new instructions and consequent decisions, realizing that he acted without valid negotiating powers, but it was too late for reversal, and further negotiations proceeded towards the conclusion of the final peace treaty.

== Treaty ==
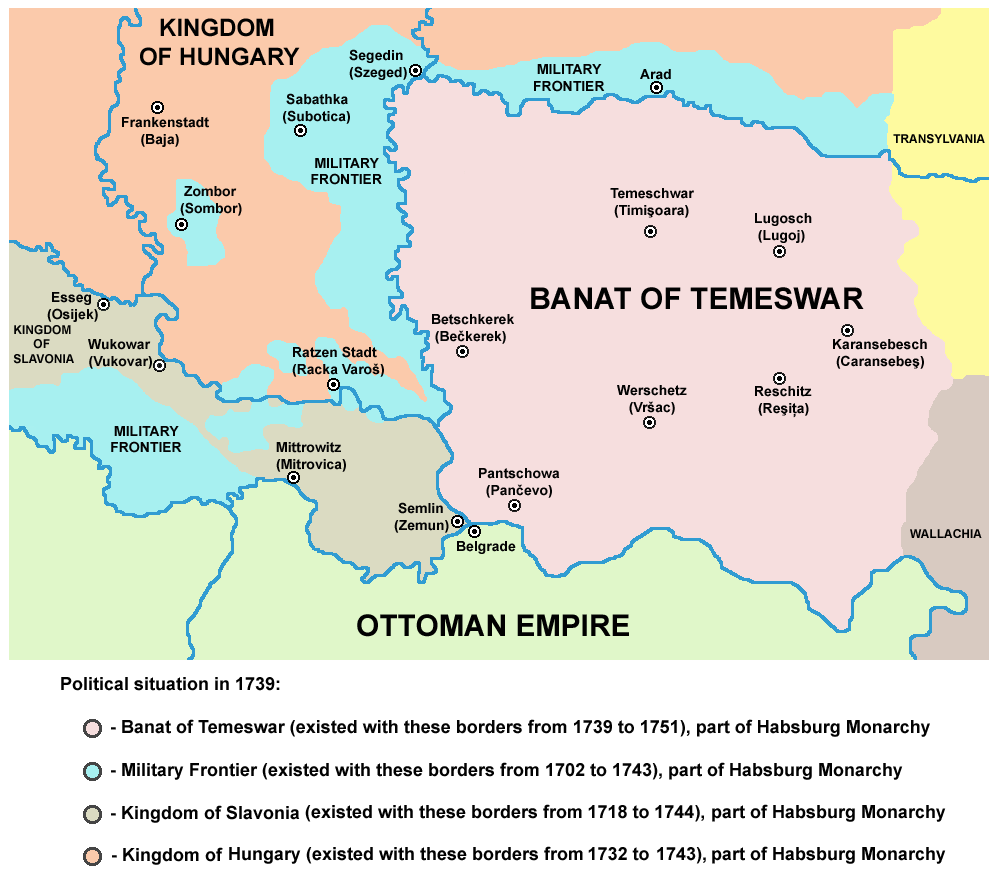
Political situation after the Treaty of Belgrade

After some further negotiations, the final peace treaty was concluded on 18 September. It was also signed in the Grand vizier's camp near Belgrade. By the Treaty of Belgrade, the Habsburgs agreed to cede three provinces to the Ottomans: the Banat of Craiova (modern Oltenia), the Kingdom of Serbia with Belgrade, and Bosnian section of Posavina. All of those territories were previously gained for the Habsburg Monarchy by the Treaty of Passarowitz in 1718, and remained under Habsburg rule until 1739. New demarcation line, under the Treaty of Belgrade, was set at the rivers Sava and Danube.

The Treaty of Belgrade effectively ended the existence of the Habsburg-held Kingdom of Serbia, which had existed since 1718. The retreat of Habsburg forces was followed by a major Serbian migration from the territories ceded to the Ottoman Empire. These Serbian lands remained under Ottoman rule until the next Habsburg-Ottoman war (1788–1791), during which they were again temporarily occupied by Habsburg forces in 1788–1789, with the support of Serbian rebels.

The treaty is also notable for being one of the last international treaties to be written in Latin.

== Aftermath ==
The Habsburg decision to enter negotiations in August 1739 forced its ally Russia to also accept peace talks, through French mediation, that resulted in a separate preliminary peace treaty that was signed on the same day (18 September) in Belgrade, and was later finalized by the Treaty of Niš (3 October), thus ending the Russo-Turkish War (1735–1739).

After the formal ratification of both peace treaties, diplomatic instruments were exchanged and the final convention was signed in Constantinople on 28 December 1739, also through the French mediation, thus concluding the war. In the meantime, both count Neipperg and field marshal Wallis were arrested by the Habsburg state authorities and accused for the unfavorable outcome of negotiations. Only after the Emperor's death in 1740 they were pardoned.

== See also ==
- Ottoman–Habsburg wars
- Ottoman wars in Europe
- List of treaties of the Ottoman Empire
- Great Migrations of the Serbs

== Notes ==
1. (German: Frieden von Belgrad, Turkish: Belgrad antlaşması, Serbian: Београдски мир/Beogradski mir)

== Sources ==
- Aksan, Virginia H. (2013) [2007]. Ottoman Wars, 1700-1870: An Empire Besieged. London & New York: Routledge. ISBN 978-1-317-88403-3.
- Bataković, Dušan T., ed. (2005). Histoire du peuple serbe [History of the Serbian People] (in French). Lausanne: L’Age d’Homme. ISBN 978-2-8251-1958-7.
- Ćirković, Sima (2004). The Serbs. Malden: Blackwell Publishing. ISBN 978-1-4051-4291-5.
- Hochedlinger, Michael (2013). Austria's Wars of Emergence: War, State and Society in the Habsburg Monarchy, 1683–1797. London & New York: Routledge. ISBN 978-1-317-88793-5.
- Hupchick, Dennis P. (2002). The Balkans: From Constantinople to Communism. New York: Palgrave. ISBN 978-0-312-29913-2.
- Ingrao, Charles W. (1994). The Habsburg Monarchy, 1618–1815. Cambridge: Cambridge University Press.
- Kurtaran, Uğur (2018). "Ottoman-Austria border determination works and newly determined borders according to the Treaty of Belgrade of 1739". Belgrade 1521-1867. Belgrade: The Institute of History. pp. 169–192.
- Mikaberidze, Alexander, ed. (2011a). Conflict and Conquest in the Islamic World: A Historical Encyclopedia. Vol. 1. Santa Barbara: ABC-CLIO.
- Mikaberidze, Alexander, ed. (2011b). Conflict and Conquest in the Islamic World: A Historical Encyclopedia. Vol. 2. Santa Barbara: ABC-CLIO.
- Oruç, Hatice (2018). "Belgrade according to the 1741 dated tahrir defter on the Smederevo sanjak". Belgrade 1521-1867. Belgrade: The Institute of History. pp. 193–257.
- Regele, Oskar (1954). "Die Schuld des Grafen Reinhard Wilhelm von Neipperg am Belgrader Frieden 1739 und an der Niederlage bei Mollwitz 1741". Mitteilungen des Österreichischen Staatsarchivs. 7: 373–398.
- Roider, Karl A. (1972a). The Reluctant Ally: Austria's Policy in the Austro-Turkish War, 1737–1739. Baton Rouge: Louisiana State University Press. ISBN 978-0-8071-0237-4.
- Roider, Karl A. (1972b). "The Perils of Eighteenth-Century Peacemaking: Austria and the Treaty of Belgrade, 1739". Central European History. 5 (3): 195–207. doi:10.1017/s0008938900015478. JSTOR 4545635. S2CID 145605956.
- Stavrianos, Leften (2000) [1958]. The Balkans Since 1453. London: Hurst. ISBN 978-1-85065-551-0.
- Sugar, Peter F. (1996) [1977]. Southeastern Europe under Ottoman Rule, 1354-1804. Seattle: University of Washington Press. ISBN 978-0-295-80363-0.
- Tupetz, Theodor (1878). "Der Türkenfeldzug von 1739 und der Friede zu Belgrad". Historische Zeitschrift. 40: 1–51. doi:10.1524/hzhz.1878.40.jg.1. JSTOR 27592807. S2CID 164314285.
- Wheatcroft, Andrew (2008). The Enemy at the Gate: Habsburgs, Ottomans, and the Battle for Europe. London: Bodley Head Random House. ISBN 978-0-224-07364-6.
