= Nişancı Ahmed Pasha =

Grand Vizier of the Ottoman Empire from 1740 to 1742

Nişancı · Şehla · Kör · Hacı Ahmed Pasha
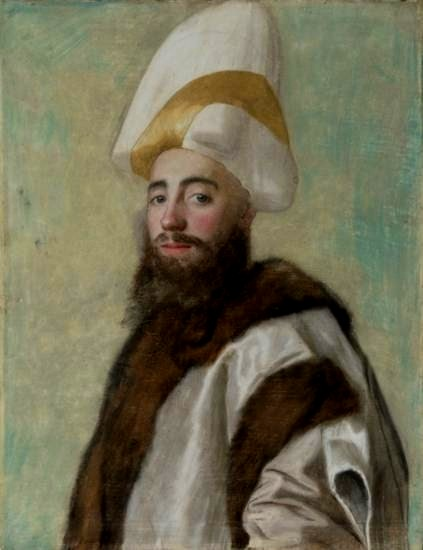

Grand Vizier of the Ottoman Empire
- In office 23 June 1740 – 21 April 1742
- Monarch: Mahmud I
- Preceded by: Ivaz Mehmed Pasha
- Succeeded by: Hekimoğlu Ali Pasha

Ottoman Governor of Egypt
- In office 1748–1751
- Preceded by: Yeğen Ali Pasha
- Succeeded by: Seyyid Abdullah Pasha

Personal details
- Died: February 1753 Aleppo, Aleppo Eyalet, Ottoman Empire

Nişancı Ahmed Pasha (died February 1753), also called Şehla Ahmed Pasha, Hacı Şehla Ahmed Pasha, or Kör Vezir Ahmed Pasha ("Ahmed Pasha the Blind Vizier"), was an Ottoman Grand Vizier during the reign of Mahmud I. He was also the Ottoman governor of Egypt from 1748 to 1751.

== Early life ==
He was sometimes called Kör Vezir ("blind vizier") because he was somewhat cross-eyed.

== Later years ==
After the Treaty of Kerden, he was appointed the governor of Baghdad Eyalet in Ottoman Iraq in 1747, the governor of Egypt Eyalet in 1748, and the governor of Adana Eyalet in 1751. However, Ahmed Pasha refused this last position in Adana, and in 1752, he returned to his former governorship in Aleppo, where he died in February 1753.

== Interests ==
Contemporaries in Ottoman Egypt described him as a man interested in the sciences and philosophy, but reported that he was disappointed when he discovered that Egypt's famed Al-Azhar University had ceased to teach about sciences and focused on only religious education. Reportedly, he found even the most educated Egyptians and ulema to be illiterate in basic mathematics, spending most of his time with the few he found that shared his interest in the sciences.

== See also ==
- List of Ottoman grand viziers
- List of Ottoman governors of Egypt

Political offices
Preceded by Ivaz Mehmed Pasha	Grand Vizier of the Ottoman Empire; 22 June 1740 – 23 April 1742	Succeeded by Hekimoğlu Ali Pasha
Preceded by Yeğen Ali Pasha	Ottoman Governor of Egypt; 1748–1751	Succeeded by Seyyid Abdullah Pasha
