= Leontiev campaign to Crimea =

1735 Russian military campaign against the Crimean Khanate

Leontiev expedition to Crimea
- Part of the Russo-Turkish War (1735–1739)
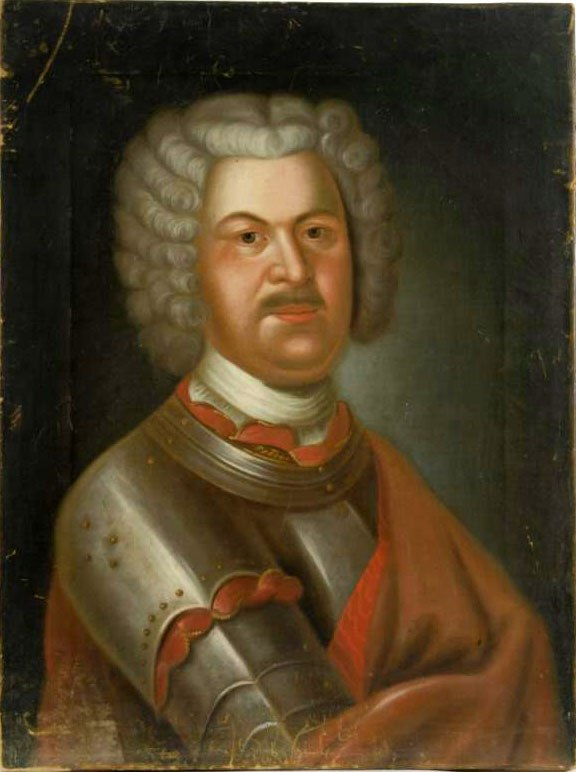
- Portrait of Mikhail Leontiev by unknown author, c. 1780
Date	1 October – 6 November 1735
Location	Zaporizhzhia, Crimean Khanate; Present-day Russian Federation
Result	Crimean victory

Belligerents
Russia	Crimean Khanate: Nogai Horde

Commanders and leaders
Mikhail Ivanovich Leontiev	Qaplan I Giray

Strength
39,000 (incl. 20,000 Cossacks)	Unknown

Casualties and losses
7 killed 6 wounded 9,000 sick	1,200 killed 47 captured (Russian claims)

The (Leontiev) expedition to Crimea was a punitive expedition undertaken by the Russians against the Crimean Khanate. Taking place in autumn 1735, during the start of the Russo-Turkish War. The punishing forces were unable to get further than Kuban, and despite a number of successes in battle, they were forced to retreat.

== History ==
In the summer of 1735, during their raids into the Caucasus, the troops of the Crimean Khan Qaplan repeatedly violated the border with the Russian Empire, which greatly worried it. Since the army of the Ottoman Empire was tied up in the war with the Safavid Iran. The Russians decided to organize a campaign in the Crimea and "eliminate the Tatar threat." On 20 July military cabinet under Christoph Münnich's command decided to march into Crimea, but in a hurry it was not possible to assemble the planned 56,475 people, besides the field marshal himself fell ill, so only a part of the troops went – 39,000 – of which more than half were representatives of the Don Cossacks. The corps' actions were initially successful. Russians rapidly descended down the Dnieper, heading to Crimea, the most important event was the Battle of the Konski Vody, where, according to the Russians, 1,200 Tatars died and 47 more were captured, 7 people died on the Russian side and 6 were wounded. Such successes motivated the commander to continue the campaign. However, the first setbacks soon began. The Tatars used scorched earth tactics, which made it impossible to find fodder for the horses, which created problems. But the main snag was that the weather deteriorated significantly, some even began to snow, which led to illness in the troops. Leontiev, seeing this, stood at the Gorskie Vody tract on October 10. At the subsequent council, it was decided to start retreating 3 days later. During this period, no one disturbed the Russian Army, and it returned in good order with 9,000 sick soldiers. The campaign against the Crimean Tatars provoked a violent reaction in Constantinople, which led to the outbreak of a new war of the Russian-Austrian alliance against the Turks.
