= Russo-Turkish War (1735–1739) =

Fifth conflict of the Russo-Turkish wars

Russo-Turkish War of 1735–1739 Austro-Turkish War of 1737–1739
- Part of the Russo-Ottoman and Austro-Ottoman war series
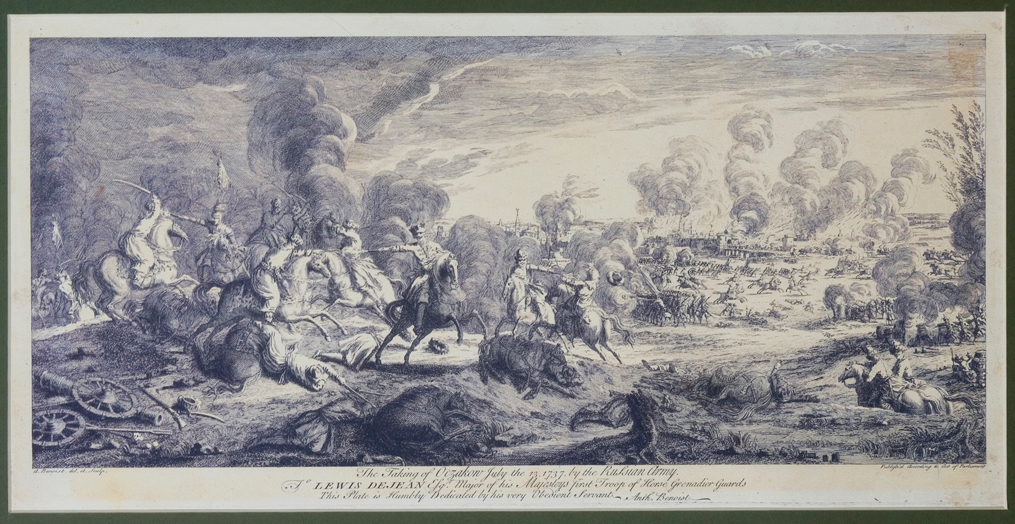
Date	31 May 1735 – 3 October 1739
Location	The Balkans and Eastern Europe
Result	See the Final stage section
Territorial changes	Habsburg monarchy cedes Kingdom of Serbia, Oltenia, southern Banat to the Ottoman Empire

Belligerents
Russian Empire; Cossack Hetmanate; Terek Cossacks; Kalmyk Khanate; Kabardia; Habsburg monarchy; Kingdom of Serbia	Ottoman Empire; Crimean Khanate; Moldavia; Wallachia

Commanders and leaders
(Russian Empire) Burkhard Münnich (Russian Empire) Peter Lacy (Habsburg monarchy) Ernst Gideon von Laudon	(Ottoman Empire) Mehmed Pasha (Ottoman Empire) Ali Pasha (Ottoman Empire) Yahya Pasha (Ottoman Empire) Claude Alexandre de Bonneval (Moldavia) Grigore II Ghica (Wallachia) Constantin Mavrocordat

Strength
1737: (Russian Empire) 130,000 (Habsburg monarchy) 166,000 1738: (Russian Empire) 173,000 (Habsburg monarchy) 130,000	(Ottoman Empire) 155,000 (peak)

Casualties and losses
(Russian Empire) 100,000–150,000 killed (mainly because of hunger, heat and disease): 8,000 in battles (for 1 year); (Habsburg monarchy) 20,000 killed and wounded (excluding disease)	(Ottoman Empire) 44,427 casualties in battles Total casualties unknown

The Russo-Turkish War of 1735–1739 between Russia and the Ottoman Empire was caused by the Ottoman Empire's war with Persia and the continuing raids by the Crimean Tatars. The war also represented Russia's ongoing struggle for access to the Black Sea. In 1737, the Habsburg monarchy joined the war on Russia's side, known in historiography as the Austro-Turkish War of 1737–1739.

== Russian diplomacy before the war ==
By the outbreak of the Russo-Turkish War, Russia had successfully secured a favorable international situation. This was achieved through the signing of treaties with Iran from 1732 to 1735 (which was engaged in a conflict with the Ottoman Empire from 1730 to 1735) and by supporting the accession of Augustus III to the Polish throne in 1735, instead of Stanislaw Leszczynski, who had been nominated by pro-Ottoman France. Austria had been Russia's ally since 1726.

== Initial stage of the war in 1735–1736 ==
The casus belli was the raids of the Crimean Tatars on the Cossack Hetmanate at the end of 1735 and the Crimean Khan's military campaign in the Caucasus. In 1736, the Russian commanders envisioned the seizure of Azov and the Crimean Peninsula.

In 1735, on the eve of the war, Russia made peace with Persia, returning all the remaining territory conquered during the Russo-Persian War (Treaty of Ganja).

On 20 May 1736, the Russian Dnieper Army (62,000 men), under the command of Field Marshal Burkhard Christoph von Münnich, stormed the Crimean fortifications at Perekop and occupied Bakhchysarai on June 17. The Crimean khans failed to defend their territory and repel the invasion. In 1736, 1737, and 1738, Russian expeditionary armies broke through their defensive positions, pushing deep into the Crimean Peninsula, driving the Tatar noblemen into the hills and forcing Khan Fetih II Giray to take refuge at sea. They burned Gozlev, Karasubazar, and the khan's palace in the Crimean capital, Bakhchysarai. Additionally, they captured the Ottoman fortress at Azov.

Khans Qaplan I Giray and Fetih II Giray were deposed by the Ottoman sultan Mahmud I for their incompetence. However, the years 1737 to 1739 were notable plague years, and all sides of the conflict were crippled by disease and unsanitary conditions. Despite his success and a string of battlefield victories, the outbreak of an epidemic coupled with shortages forced Münnich to retreat to Ukraine.

On 19 June 1736, the Russian Don Army of 28,000 men, under the command of General Peter Lacy, with support from the Don Flotilla under the command of Vice Admiral Peter Bredahl, seized the fortress of Azov. The Crimean campaign of 1736 ended with Russian withdrawal into Ukraine, resulting in an estimated 30,000 lives lost. Only 2,000 of these losses were related to war, while the rest were due to disease, hunger, and famine. In July 1737, Münnich's army stormed the Turkish fortress of Ochakov. Lacy's army, already 40,000 men strong, marched into Crimea the same month and captured Karasubazar (see Lacy's campaign to Crimea). However, Lacy and his troops had to leave Crimea due to a lack of supplies.

== The course of the war in 1737–1738 ==
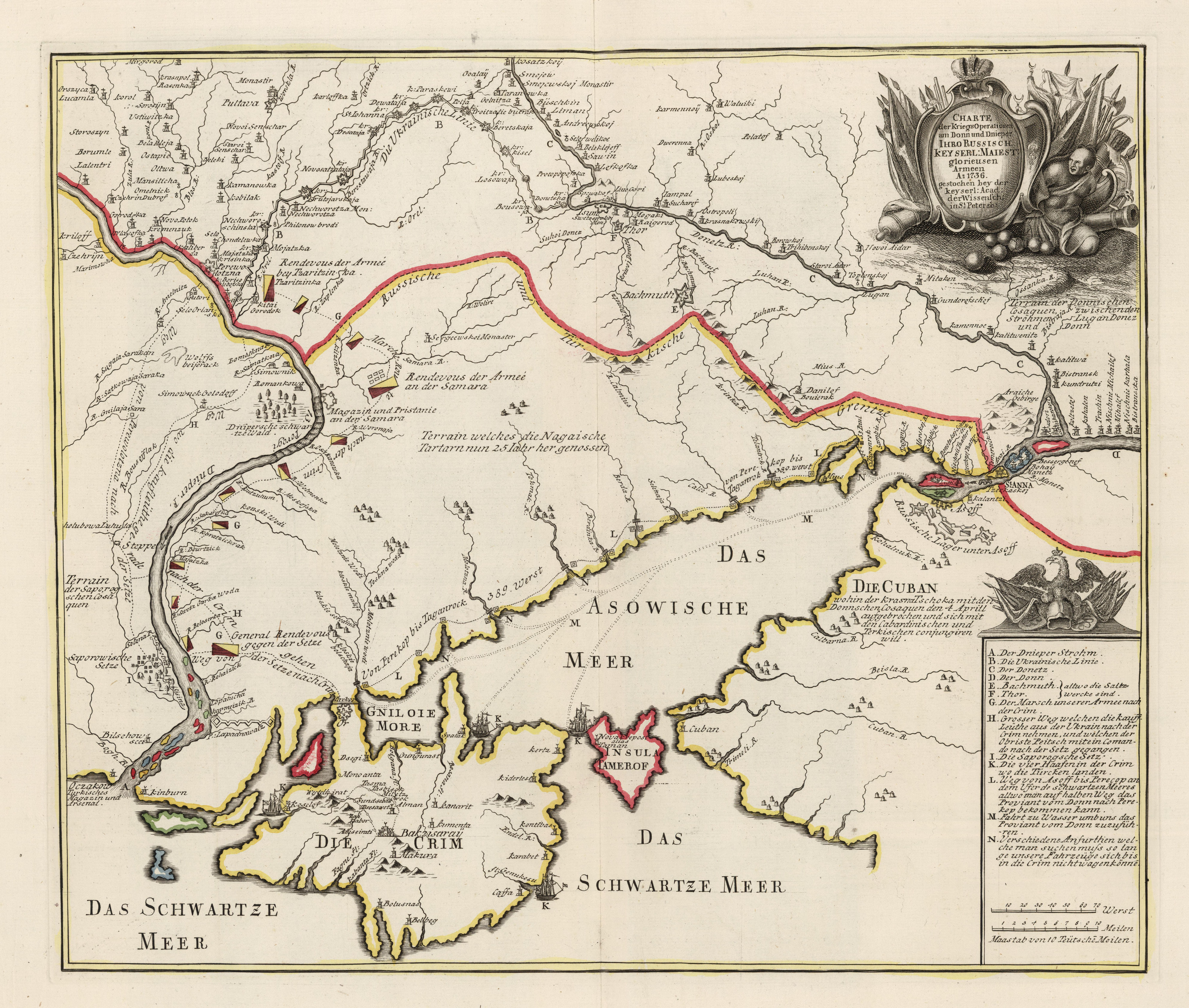
Russian campaign in 1736

In July 1737, the Habsburg monarchy entered the war against the Ottoman Empire. Initial incursion of Habsburg armies into Ottoman Serbia resulted in the capture of Niš, that was followed by the pro-Habsburg Serbian uprising against the Ottoman rule. On the western section of the front, Habsburg armies were defeated at the Battle of Banja Luka on 4 August 1737. There were no significant military operations in 1738. The Russian Army had to leave Ochakov and Kinburn due to a plague outbreak. In August, Russia, Austria, and the Ottoman Empire began negotiations in Nemirov, which would turn out to be fruitless.

According to an Ottoman Muslim account of the war translated into English by C. Fraser, Bosnian Muslim women fought in battles, having "acquired the courage of heroes" against the Austrian Germans at the siege of Osterwitch-atyk (Östroviç-i âtık) fortress. Women also fought in the defense of the fortresses of Būzin (Büzin) and Chetin (Çetin). Their bravery was also described in a French account. Novi Pazar, Zvornik, Gradiška, and Banja luka were also struck by the Austrians.

== The final stage of the war in 1739 ==
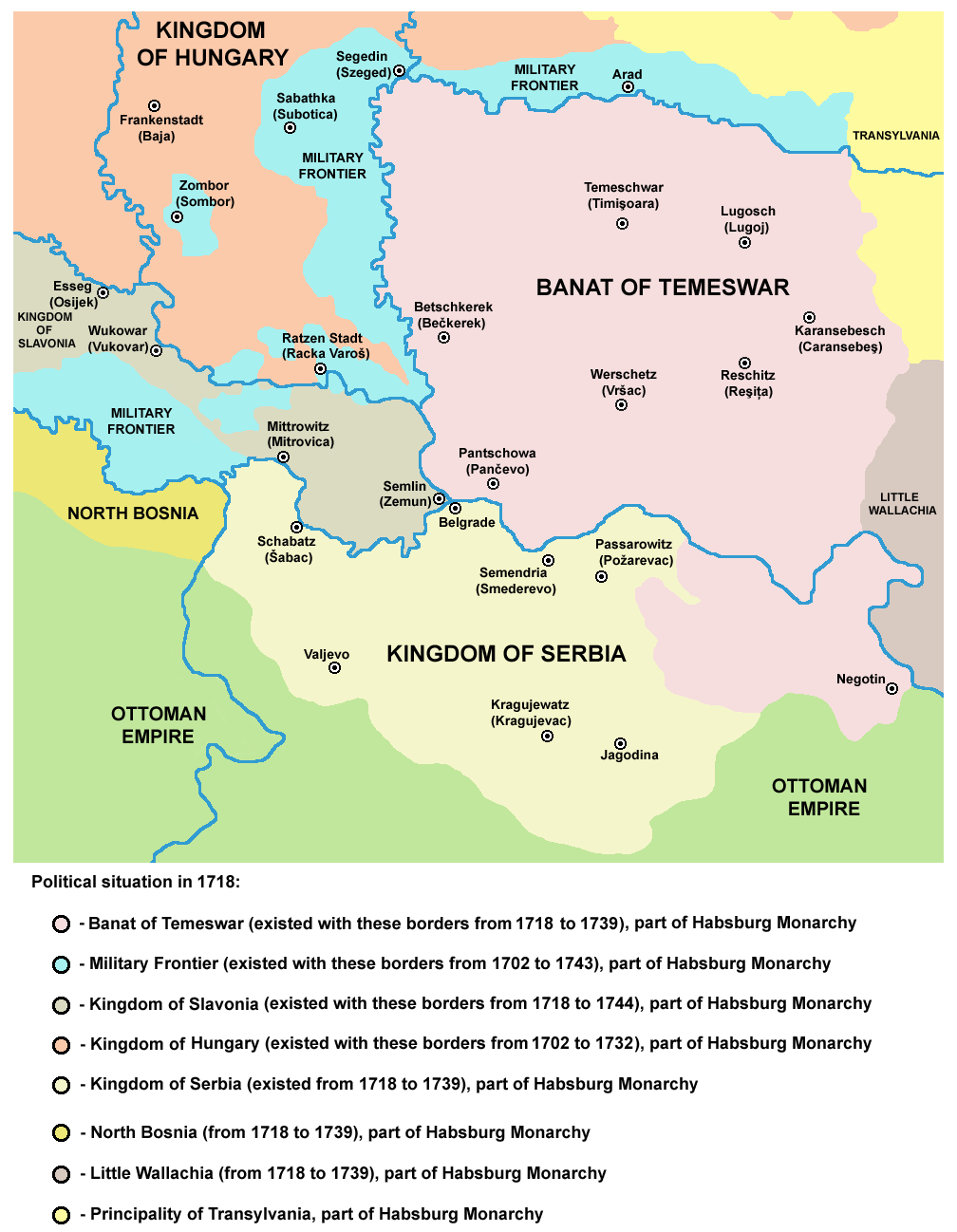
Political situation during the Habsburg-Ottoman conflict in 1737-1739

In the summer of 1739, the Russian army, commanded by Field Marshal Münnich, crossed the Dniester river by the late July, defeated the Turks at the Battle of Stavuchany on August 28 [O.S. August 17], and occupied the fortresses of Khotyn on August 30 [O.S. August 19]. Proceeding further, Münnich crossed the Prut river by September 10 [O.S. August 30], while his advance units, headed by young Constantine Cantemir, son of late Antioch Cantemir, former Prince of Moldavia (d. 1726), reached Iași, the capital city of the Principality of Moldavia on September 12 [O.S. September 1]. Münnich entered Iași on September 14 [O.S. September 3] and pressed Moldavian boyars to accept the annexation of Moldavia on September 16 [O.S. September 5].

However, the main Habsburg army suffered a strategic defeat at the Battle of Grocka near Belgrade, on 21–22 July. Field marshal Wallis retreated into Belgrade Fortress, while Turks laid the siege of the city. Already on 31 July, the imperial government in Vienna decided to relieve Wallis of his previously granted powers to negotiate with the Ottomans, and those powers were consequently transferred to count Neipperg, who arrived at Belgrade on 16 August, and then proceeded to the camp of the Grand Vizier on 18 August, thus initiating peace negotiations. There he found himself isolated, and dependent on the French mediator, marquis Louis Sauveur de Villeneuve. On 1 September, Neipperg agreed to sign a preliminary peace agreement with the Ottomans that included the loss of Belgrade, not knowing that his original instructions were no longer valid, since the imperial government in Vienna in the meantime decided not to surrender the city, and wait for the outcome of the Russian campaign in Moldavia. News on the conclusion of the preliminary peace treaty reached Vienna on 7 September, but it was too late for reversal. On 18 September, the final peace Treaty of Belgrade was signed, thus confirming Habsburg loss of Wallachia Minor (Oltenia), central Serbia with Belgrade, and the Bosnian section of Posavina.

Using mediating powers granted to him by the Russian court, Villeneuve also negotiated a separate Russo-Turkish preliminary peace treaty, that was signed on the same day (18 September) in Belgrade. Faced with the threat of a possible Swedish invasion, and consequent Ottoman alliances with Sweden, Poland, and Prussia, the Russian government decided to accept terms that were reached through the French mediation. On 3 October, the final Russo-Turkish Treaty of Niš was signed, thus ending the Russo-Ottoman war. The Azak Fortress was demolished and its lands were turned into neutral territory as it became a centre of attack in line with the demands for access to the Black Sea. And consolidated Russia's control over the Zaporizhia in exchange for Russia abandoning its claims to Crimea and Moldova. For Austria, the war proved a stunning defeat. The Russian forces were much more successful on the field, but they lost tens of thousands to disease. The Russians had access to the Black Sea but were not allowed to maintain any fleet in the Azov and Black Sea.

== Military details ==
=== Geography ===
are Turkish forts

The Ottoman Empire held forts along the north shore of the Black Sea and on the eastern side of the Balkans. Azov kept the Don Cossacks out of the Sea of Azov. Kaffa dominated the Crimean Khanate. Or Kapi, behind the Perekop trenches, guarded the entrance to Crimea. Ochakov, at the mouth of the Dnieper, kept the Dnieper Cossacks out of the Black Sea. Khotyn, on the upper Dniester, watched the Polish Commonwealth. The Turkish border was close to the current Ukrainian border along the Dniester. Polish claims extended to the Dnieper, except for Kiev. Russia had a very vague border about 100 or more miles south of the current border. The semi-independent Zaporozhian Cossacks were along the Dnieper bend. The Crimean Khanate and its Nogai steppe allies raided Poland and Russia and sold the captives to the Turks at Kaffa.

=== Before 1735 ===
In 1722, Russia and Turkey took advantage of Persian weakness to capture the northwest part of the Persian Empire. Russia took the west side of the Caspian and the Ottomans got as far as Tabriz. Nader Shah slowly restored Persian power. By 1734, Persia was reconquering its land south of the Caucasus, and it was clear that Russia could not hold its gains. In 1733 or 1734, the Turks ordered Crimea to send a force across the north Caucasus to attack the Persians. Eropkin on the Terek river tried to stop them and lost 55 men. The army went down the west shore of the Caspian as far as the Samur River, where it was recalled by Turkey for unexplained reasons.

=== 1735: War starts ===
In 1735, the Crimean khan led 80,000 men across the North Caucasus and south to Derbent. By the end of 1735, he received news of Leontiev's raid on Crimea and decided to turn back. During his return journey, he spent time foraging in Kabardia and eventually reached Crimea in the spring of 1736. Crimean interference in the Caucasus served as one pretext for the war.

Leontiev's raid. = Turkish fort

In March 1735, through the Treaty of Ganja, Russia returned its territorial gains to Persia and forged an alliance with Persia against Turkey. With Crimean troops absent from the peninsula and the Turks engaged with Persia, Russia seized the opportunity for a surprise attack. General Münnich moved south and discovered that his army would not be ready until the following year. In order not to waste that year's campaigning season, he dispatched Leontiev on a raid.

1735: Leontiev's raid: Leontiev set off on 1 October 1735, far too late in the season. He started near the Samara River and marched south, east of the Dnieper bend. At Konska Voda, he killed about 1,000 Nogais and stole their livestock. He turned west with the river, and on 16 October, reached the Russian fort of Kamenny Zaton, about 10 days' march from Perekop. Here, he turned back because of the cold and the loss of 3,000 horses. The next day, a snowstorm killed another 1,000 horses. By late November, he was back where he started, having lost 9,000 of his 40,000 men and about 9,000 horses.

=== 1736: 1st Crimea, Azov, Kinburn ===
1736: Azov captured: Around 30 March 1736, Münnich and 5,000 men besieged Azov. Additional soldiers arrived, and on 7 April, Münnich left to join the main force on the Dnieper. In May Peter Lacy took over and on 26 June the Turks surrendered on condition of safe passage. Lacy set off for Crimea, but turned back when he heard of Münnich's withdrawal.

1736: First Russian invasion of Crimea: In mid-April, Münnich set off south with 54,000 men and 8,000 or 9,000 carts, following Leontiev's route east of the Dnieper bend. On 4 May, the Tatars were defeated at the Bela Zirka river near Kamenny Zaton and withdrew to Perekop. By 19 May, Russia had 30,000 troops facing Perekop. On 20 May, the wall was breached, and on 22 May, the 2,254 Turks in the Or Qapi fort surrendered on parole.

Russia now entered Crimea for the first time. On 5 June, they raided Gozleve for supplies. On 17 June, they captured Bakhchisarai. The khan's palace was burned, either accidentally or deliberately. On 23 June, they burned the kalga's seat at Ak Mechet. Most of the Crimean army had scattered to the hills, while the Turks withdrew to Kaffa. Münnich hoped to capture Kaffa before the Turks could send reinforcements, but on 25 June, he decided to withdraw. Dysentery had first been noted on 7 June. Soon, a third of the army was sick, and many of the rest weakened. There was not enough food, fresh water, or fodder to support his army. By 18 July, they were back on the Samara river. Half of the army had been lost, 2,000 in fighting, and the rest from disease. Because of the invasion, Crimean khan Qaplan I Giray was replaced by Fetih II Giray.

1736: Kinburn captured: After Perekop was captured, Leontev and 13,000 men were sent west to capture the fort on the Kinburn Peninsula, south of Ochakov. The garrison was allowed to abandon the fort and cross to Ochakov on the opposite bank. 250 Russian prisoners were freed there.

=== 1737: 2nd Crimea, Ochakov ===
On 9 January 1737, Austria joined the war drawing Turkish troops away from the Black Sea. The Turko-Persian conflict had ended in September 1736, but it took time to move Turkish troops west. The plan for 1737 involved one army capturing the Turkish fort of Ochakov at the mouth of the Dnieper-Bug estuary, while a second army invaded Crimea.

1737: Capture of Ochakov: In early April, Münnich left the Kiev area with about 70,000 men. On 30 June, they reached Ochakov, which now had 20,000 defenders. Fighting began the next day, and on 3 July, heated shot set the town on fire. The fire spread to the powder magazine, which blew up, killing thousands of Turks. This caused the Turks to surrender the same day.

Münnich left 8,000 men to hold the fort and returned with the rest of the army to Poltava. In October, the Ottomans tried to retake the fort under the direct orders of Sultan Mahmut I. All of their attempts failed, and on 30 October, they withdrew. (Next spring, the plague appeared in the fort and was reported in Moldavia, Wallachia, Poland, and Zaporozhia. It increased, and in September 1738, Ochakov and Kinburn were evacuated to escape the plague because the weakened troops would not be able to resist if the Turks came back.)

X=crossing points

1737: Second invasion of Crimea: The goal was to prevent the Crimeans from supporting Ochakov, damage Crimea as much as possible, and capture the Turkish fort of Kaffa if possible. On 3 May 1737, Peter Lacy set out from the Mius River near Taganrog, about 50 km west of Azov. Around 320 small boats with supplies and Don Cossacks followed along the coast. On 23 May, the two forces joined at what is now Mariupol, about 100 km further west. On 28 June, a Turkish fleet caught the Azov flotilla near Henichesk. After two gun duels, they were driven off (1 July). Soon after, a storm destroyed most of the flotilla along with its food and ammunition.

Instead of attacking the 60,000 Tatars waiting at Perekop, Lacy built a pontoon bridge out of water casks and crossed the Henichesk Strait onto the Arabat Spit, starting on 2 July. Khan Fetih headed south toward the far end of the spit, but Lacy again outflanked him by crossing to the mainland near the Salhyr River, causing the Crimeans to disperse. Lacy went southwest, and on 14 July, he burned Karasubazar. Three days later, he chose to withdraw. He had lost most of his supplies with the flotilla; the Tatars were regrouping, there was not enough fresh water and fodder, and sickness was starting to appear. On 23 July, he crossed the Henichesk Strait, and a month later reached "Molochnye Vody". Because of the invasion, the Turks replaced Khan Fetih II with Meñli II Giray.

=== 1738: 3rd Crimea, western campaign ===
Planning started in November 1737. The goal for 1738 was to tie down the Crimeans while Münnich attacked along the Dniester in support of the Austrians.

1738: Third invasion of Crimea: Peter Lacy started from Vol'chye Vody (location?) with an army about the same size as the previous year. On 19 May, he met the supply fleet at what is now Berdiansk on the Azov coast (see Azov fleet below). Lacy learned that Mengli and 30,000 men were waiting behind Perekop, and that Turkish troops had garrisoned Or Kapi. They rested at Molochnye Vody. Instead of attacking Perekop, Lacy chose to cross the Syvash by wading at low tide, possibly near the Chongar Strait. They turned west and got between Perekop and the khan's army. They blasted Or Kapi with mortars, which surrendered around the beginning of July. They turned south, but on 6 July, they decided to go home. There was little food or fodder because the Crimean interior had been trashed the previous year, supplies with the Azov fleet had been lost (see Azov fleet below), and disease was beginning to appear. They stopped a Tatar attack on 9 July, rested at Perekop for a month, ruined Perekop as much as they could, and returned to Molochnye Vody.

Azov fleet: Peter Bredal with a rebuilt Azov fleet, supplies, and 4,000 Don Cossacks, met Lacy's army on 19 May. On 23 May, more Don Cossacks arrived with their own boats. On 25 May, Bredal was caught by a much larger Turkish fleet and blockaded at ‘Cape Vissarion’ (location?). The blockade was broken when the Turks unwisely pursued three escaping sloops. On 6 June, they were again caught at ‘Cape Fedotov’, probably on the long sand spit just east of Henichesk Strait. They hauled their boats across the sand spit and reassembled near Henichesk, where they were again caught on 16 June. They landed their guns, built a shore battery, and burned their boats. There was a two-day artillery duel, but the Turks chose not to land, perhaps because they lacked marines. The loss of the supply fleet forced Lacy to withdraw from Crimea.

1738: Western campaign: The goal was for Münnich to lead the main army to the Dniester and attack the border forts at either Khotin or Bender. On 17 April, he crossed the Dnieper south of Poltava, and in late June, he crossed the Bug. He reached the Dniester, but on 6 August, he abandoned the campaign because of Turkish resistance and reports of plague west of the river.

=== 1739: 4th Crimea fails, western campaign, war ends ===
1739: Failed invasion of Crimea: Levashev was supposed to march from Azov, but an epidemic forced him to halt at the Miuss River. He later returned to Azov because a fire had destroyed the Azov arsenal and granary. Bredal could not sail from Azov due to disease and a shortage of ships. Lacy left Izium on 10 May. His force was weakened because much had been transferred to the western campaign. In July, he learned that the Turks had sent troops and a fleet, and that Levashev had turned back. He marched toward Perekop, saw that there was no hope, and returned to the Ukrainian line, which he reached on 24 August.

1739: Western campaign: Münnich planned to capture Khotin to take pressure off the Austrians, who were doing poorly. He left Kiev in late April, crossing Polish territory because the land was better and the Poles were too weak to interfere. He won the Battle of Stavuchany on 28 August, took Khotin on 30 August, and entered Jassy on 14 September. There he learned that Austria had signed a preliminary peace treaty on 1 September, and the final peace treaty on 18 September, which made his position untenable. In October, he was ordered to return to Russian territory.

1739: Treaties: The war was ended by the Treaty of Belgrade with Austria on 18 September and the Treaty of Niš with Russia on 3 October. All three parties wanted out because the war as it was costing more than anything they might gain. Russia was also worried about the looming Russo-Swedish War (1741–1743). Russia kept nothing more than a demilitarized Azov and Zaporozhye, but it had demonstrated that it could reach Moldavia and was now a serious threat to Crimea. After the formal ratification of peace treaties, diplomatic instruments were exchanged and the final convention was signed in Constantinople on 28 December 1739, also through the French mediation, thus concluding the war.

=== Note on the Austro-Turkish war ===
Austria hoped to gain land in the Balkans while the Turks were tied down with Russia. The border was then about 100 km south of Belgrade in land gained in 1717. In 1737, Austria went south, captured Niš but soon gave it up. In 1738, the Turks advanced and took places in central Serbia and on the Danube. In 1739, Austria crossed the Danube, fought a battle at Grocka, and fell back to the Danube. Belgrade was under siege by the Turks when talks began. Austria gave up Belgrade with central Serbia, south of the Danube, and also western Wallachia, which was perhaps more than the military situation required. The war was poorly managed. The next year, the War of the Austrian Succession began.

== See also ==
- Bibliography of Russian history (1613–1917)

== Sources ==
- Aksan, Virginia H. (2013) [2007]. Ottoman Wars, 1700-1870: An Empire Besieged. London & New York: Routledge. ISBN 978-1-317-88403-3.
- Ćirković, Sima (2004). The Serbs. Malden: Blackwell Publishing. ISBN 9781405142915.
- Davies, Brian (2011). Empire and Military Revolution in Eastern Europe: Russia's Turkish Wars in the Eighteenth Century. London & New York: Bloomsbury Publishing. ISBN 978-1-4411-6880-1.
- Егоршина, Петрова (2023). История русской армии [The history of the Russian Army] (in Russian). Moscow: Edition of the Russian Imperial Library. ISBN 978-5-699-42397-2.
- Hickok, Michael R. (1997). Ottoman Military Administration in Eighteenth-Century Bosnia. Leiden: Brill. ISBN 90-04-10689-8.
- Hochedlinger, Michael (2013) [2003]. Austria's Wars of Emergence: War, State and Society in the Habsburg Monarchy, 1683–1797. London & New York: Routledge. ISBN 978-1-317-88793-5.
- Kernosovsky, Anton (1938). История русской армии [History of the Russian army] (PDF).
- Mikaberidze, Alexander, ed. (2011a). Conflict and Conquest in the Islamic World: A Historical Encyclopedia. Vol. 1. Santa Barbara: ABC-CLIO.
- Mikaberidze, Alexander, ed. (2011b). Conflict and Conquest in the Islamic World: A Historical Encyclopedia. Vol. 2. Santa Barbara: ABC-CLIO.
- Nelipovich, Sergei (2010). Союз двуглавых Орлов: русско-австрийский военный альянс в XVIII веке [The Union of Double-headed Eagles: the Russian-Austrian military Alliance in the XVIII century] (in Russian). Moscow: Квадрига. ISBN 978-5-91791-045-1.
- Riasanovsky, Nicholas; Steinberg, Mark (2010). The History of Russia. Oxford University Press.
- Roider, Karl A. (1972a). The Reluctant Ally: Austria's Policy in the Austro-Turkish War, 1737–1739. Baton Rouge: Louisiana State University Press. ISBN 978-0-8071-0237-4.
- Roider, Karl A. (1972b). "The Perils of Eighteenth-Century Peacemaking: Austria and the Treaty of Belgrade, 1739". Central European History. 5 (3): 195–207. doi:10.1017/S0008938900015478. JSTOR 4545635.
- Roider, Karl A. Jr. (1982). Austria's Eastern Question, 1700-1790. Princeton University Press. ISBN 9781400856695.
- Shapira, Dan D. Y. (2011). "The Crimean Tatars and the Austro-Ottoman Wars". The Peace of Passarowitz, 1718. West Lafayette: Purdue University Press. pp. 131–140. ISBN 978-1-61249-195-0.
- Stone, David R. (2006). A Military History of Russia: From Ivan the Terrible to the War in Chechnya. Greenwood Publishing Group.
- Tucker, Spencer C. (2010). A Global Chronology of Conflict: From the Ancient World to the Modern Middle East, Vol. II. ABC-CLIO.
- Wheatcroft, Andrew (2008). The Enemy at the Gate: Habsburgs, Ottomans, and the Battle for Europe. London: Bodley Head Random House. ISBN 978-0-224-07364-6.
- Poten, Bernhard von (1890). Handwörterbuch der gesamten Militärwissenschaften mit erläuternden Abbildungen. Sievershausen bis Zymotsche Krankheiten. Vol. 9.
- Baiov, A. K. (1912). Курс истории русского военного искусства. Том III.
- Mittheilungen des K. K. Kriegs-Archivs. Vol. 5. 1881.
- Davies, Brian (2013). Empire and Military Revolution in Eastern Europe: Russia's Turkish Wars in the Eighteenth Century.
- Bodart, Gaston (1916). Losses of Life in Modern Wars: Austria-Hungary; France. Oxford: Clarendon Press.
