= Petrovice (Rakovník District) =

- Municipality
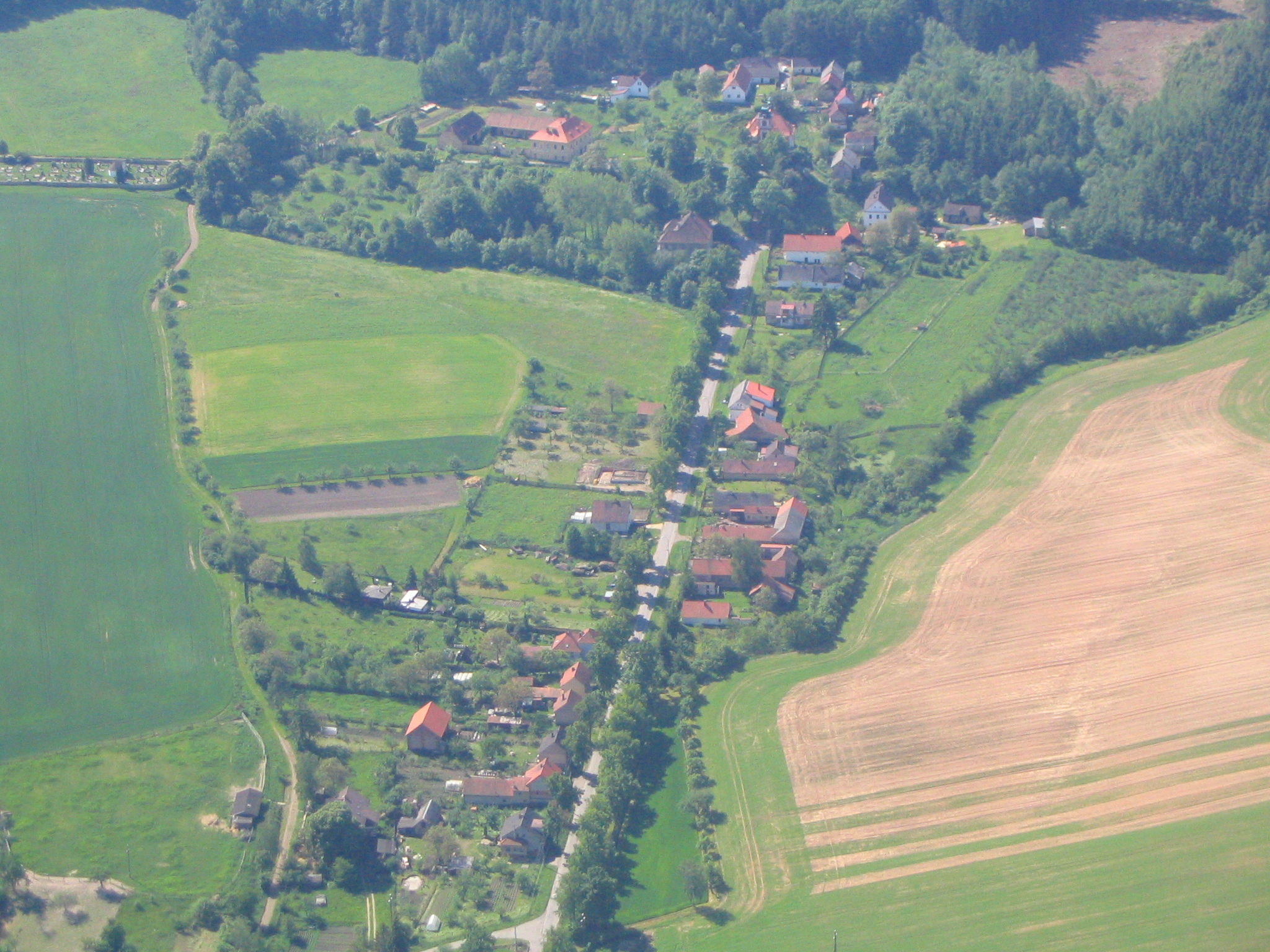
- Aerial view

- Flag Coat of arms

- Location in the Czech Republic
- Coordinates: 50°4′2″N 13°38′21″E
- Country: Czech Republic
- Region: Central Bohemian
- District: Rakovník
- First mentioned: 1520

Area
  - Total: 7.00 km^{2} (2.70 sq mi)
- Elevation: 386 m (1,266 ft)

Population (2026-01-01)
  - Total: 277
  - Density: 39.6/km^{2} (102/sq mi)
- Time zone: UTC+1 (CET)
  - Summer (DST): UTC+2 (CEST)
- Postal code: 270 35
- Website: www.obec-petrovice.cz

Petrovice is a municipality and village in Rakovník District in the Central Bohemian Region of the Czech Republic. It has about 300 inhabitants.

== Demographics ==
Historical population
Year	Pop.	±%
1869	633	—
1880	686	+8.4%
1890	549	−20.0%
1900	564	+2.7%
1910	562	−0.4%
1921	633	+12.6%
1930	557	−12.0%
1950	435	−21.9%
1961	366	−15.9%
1970	314	−14.2%
1980	296	−5.7%
1991	259	−12.5%
2001	242	−6.6%
2011	248	+2.5%
2021	275	+10.9%
Source: Censuses
