= George Olivier, count of Wallis =

Field marshal of the Holy Roman Empire

George Oliver Walsh Graf von Wallis, Freiherr von Carrighmain
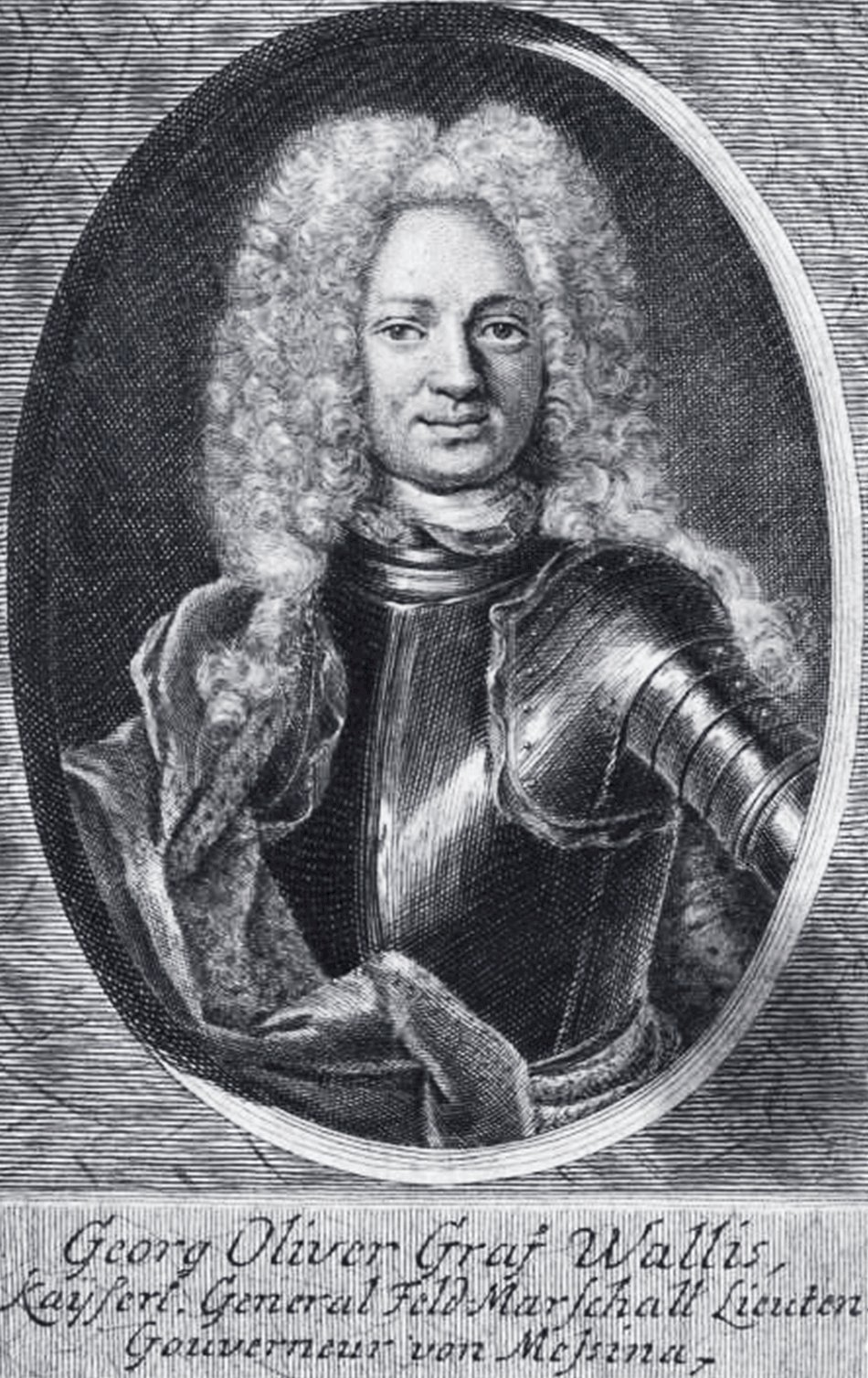
- Born: 8 February 1673; Vienna
- Died: 19 December 1744 (aged 71); Vienna
- Military career
- Allegiance: Holy Roman Empire
- Branch: Army
- Service years: 1690–1740
- Rank: Field Marshal
- Commands: Mainz (1731–34)
- Conflicts: Great Turkish War; Battle of Zenta; War of the Spanish Succession; Ottoman–Venetian War; Austro-Turkish War (1716–1718); Battle of Petrovaradin; War of the Quadruple Alliance; Anglo-Spanish War; War of the Polish Succession; Austro-Turkish War (1737–1739); Battle of Grocka

George Oliver Walsh, Count of Wallis (German: Georg Olivier Graf von Wallis, Freiherr von Carrighmain; Serbian: Георг Оливијер, гроф Валис, romanized: Georg Olivier, grof Valis; 8 February 1673, in Vienna – 19 December 1744, in Vienna) was a field marshal of Irish descent in the service of the Holy Roman Empire and the Kingdom of the Two Sicilies and last regent of the Habsburg Kingdom of Serbia (1738–1739). Born into an exiled Irish family, he distinguished himself in Sicily by his capture of Messina. He then commanded on the Rhine (1733), then in Italy and Hungary. He lost the decisive Battle of Grocka against the Ottoman Empire in 1739, thus leading to the Peace of Belgrade, which was unfavourable to Austria and thus led to his disgrace.

== Family ==
=== Ancestry ===
George Oliver's ancestor was Richard Walsh of Carrickmines, County Dublin, who became one of the first Irish officers in imperial service in 1632. He died later that year after being wounded in the Battle of Lützen. Richard's eldest son Theobald returned to Ireland, reverting to the ancestral name Walsh, (too difficult for Europeans to pronounce, hence transliterated as 'Wallis') whilst his youngest son, Olivier (1600-1667) remained in the imperial Austrian army and became the founder of the Austrian branch of the Walshes, known as Wallis, before dying in 1667 as a major general in Hungary.
Oliver's son, Feldzeugmeister Ernst Georg von Wallis (1637-1689) and his wife, Countess Maria Magdalena Elisabeth von Attems (1655-1712) were parents of George Olivier and Franz Paul von Wallis (1677–1737), his younger brother.

=== Marriage and issue ===
George Olivier of Wallis married in 1714 Countess Maria Antonia von Götzen. After her death, he married Countess Maria Theresia Kinsky von Wchinitz and Tettau (1721–1751). His only son and heir was Georg Stephan (19 July 1744 – 5 February 1832).

== Life ==
After the death in 1689 of Ernst Georg Wallis's in the Nine Years' War during the Siege of Mainz, George Olivier became a page at the court in Vienna and one year later became a lieutenant in the imperial army. In 1697 he fought as hauptmann at the battle of Zenta. During the War of the Spanish Succession (1701–14) he served first in northern Italy (rising to command a regiment as oberst in 1703), then from 1707 took part in the conquest of Naples. He also served in Spain until 1713 and by the end of the war had reached the rank of Leutnant-Feldmarschall.

He fought again in the Ottoman–Venetian War (1714–1718), under the command of Prince Eugene of Savoy at the Battle of Petrovaradin on 5 August 1716 and at the sieges of Temesvár and Belgrade. The following year he commanded three regiments and was posted to operations in Naples. In the War of the Quadruple Alliance (1718–20) he fought in the Austrian army in Sicily. He was wounded in the battle of Messina. He was later governor of that city's fortress until 1727, before returning to Austria. During that period, an anecdote exists that Olivier allegedly visited Peter Czartan, a man who claimed to be 185 years old, in 1724, and grew a liking towards him, giving him gifts upon meeting him and his son. When the Anglo-Spanish War (1727–1729) threatened to escalate, the Holy Roman Emperor ordered Olivier back to Sicily to ready the island's defences. When the attack on Sicily failed to materialise, Wallis was stood down in 1731 and from then until 1734 commanded the fortress at Mainz. In the War of the Polish Succession (1733–1735/38) he served against France in northern Italy, from 1733 in the rank of Feldzeugmeister. He was in overall command of the whole Austrian force there for a time and gained ground.

=== Governor of Serbia ===
During the Habsburg-Ottoman War (1737–1739), Wallis commanded the Habsburg army and was promoted to field marshal. From November 1738 until late 1739, he was the last governor of the Kingdom of Serbia, a Habsburg province that was created in 1718 by the Treaty of Passarowitz, incorporating central Serbia with Belgrade. In the last year of the war (1739), Wallis was the Habsburg army's supreme commander but lost the decisive battle of Grocka on 21–22 July 1739. Soon after, Austria was forced to sign the Peace of Belgrade on 18 September, losing large swathes of territory to the Ottoman Empire. Wallis bore a large part of the responsibility for the defeat. He was tried with some other generals before a war tribunal and on 22 February 1740 was sentenced to imprisonment at the fortress at Spielberg. On the death of Charles VI he was pardoned by Maria Theresa of Austria in November the same year.

== The Wallis estates ==
He spent his final years on his estates and was frequently consulted on military matters by the Viennese government. However, the war against the Turks had caused lasting damage to his brilliant military reputation, as is reflected in the assessment by later historians. In addition to the Bohemian estates of Kolešovice, Petrowice and Hochlibin, Wallis acquired or inherited several properties in the County of Glatz. He was lord of Wallisfurth (Polish: Wolany), Seitenberg and Trzebieszowice. On his brother Franz Paul's death in 1737, he inherited Plomnitz, Kieslingswalde, Glasegrund, Weißbrod, Altwaltersdorf, Kaiserswalde and Friedrichswald in Bohemia. On his death in 1744, his estates were inherited by his son Stephan (died 1832), although he sold Hassitz and Stolz to Friedrich Wilhelm, count of Schlabrendorf.

== Sources ==
- Ćirković, Sima (2004). The Serbs. Malden: Blackwell Publishing.
- Criste, Oscar (1896). "Wallis, Georg Olivier Graf von". Allgemeine Deutsche Biographie (in German). Vol. 40. Leipzig: Duncker & Humblot. pp. 749–751.
- Hochedlinger, Michael (2013). Austria's Wars of Emergence: War, State and Society in the Habsburg Monarchy, 1683–1797. London & New York: Routledge.
- Ingrao, Charles W. (1994). The Habsburg Monarchy, 1618–1815. Cambridge: Cambridge University Press.
- Murtagh: Irish Soldiers in Central Europe 1600 - 1800, in: Irish Sword, Jg. 1990.
- Roider, Karl A. (1972a). The Reluctant Ally: Austria's Policy in the Austro-Turkish War, 1737–1739. Baton Rouge: Louisiana State University Press.
- Roider, Karl A. (1972b). "The Perils of Eighteenth-Century Peacemaking: Austria and the Treaty of Belgrade, 1739". Central European History. 5 (3): 195–207.
- Wheatcroft, Andrew (2008). The Enemy at the Gate: Habsburgs, Ottomans, and the Battle for Europe. London: Bodley Head Random House.
