= Treaty of Passarowitz =

1718 peace treaty ending the Ottoman-Venetian and Austro-Turkish Wars

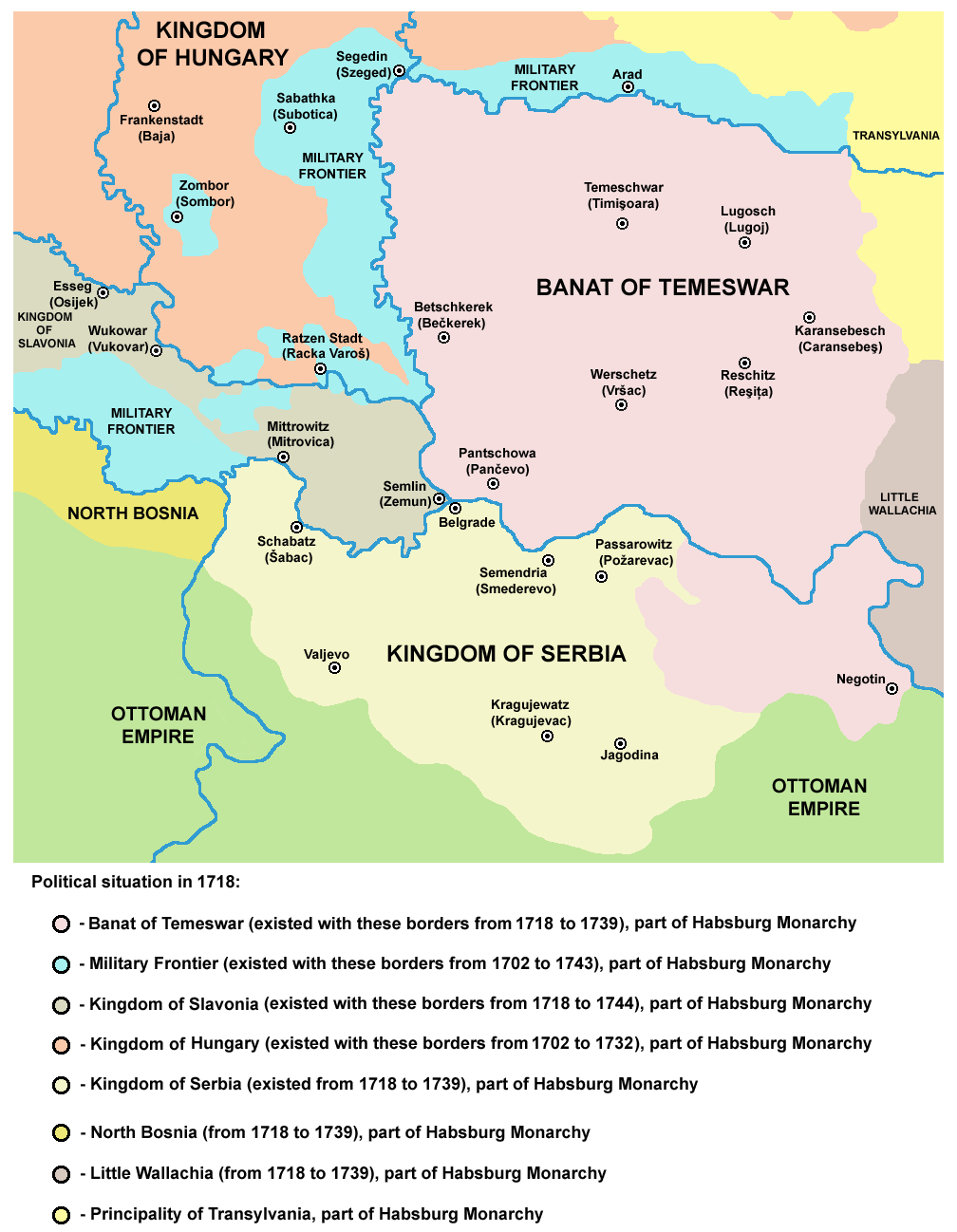
- The central Balkans in 1718. Territories passed from the Turks to the Habsburg monarchy were: Banat of Temeswar Habsburg Kingdom of Serbia Northern Bosnia Territory passed from Wallachia to the Habsburg Monarchy: Oltenia (Lesser Wallachia)
- Context: Ottoman–Venetian War (1714–18); Austro-Turkish War (1716–18)
- Signed: 21 July 1718
- Location: Passarowitz, Habsburg Kingdom of Serbia (now Požarevac, Serbia)
- Mediators: Kingdom of Great Britain; United Provinces
- Parties: Ottoman Empire; Holy Roman Empire; Republic of Venice

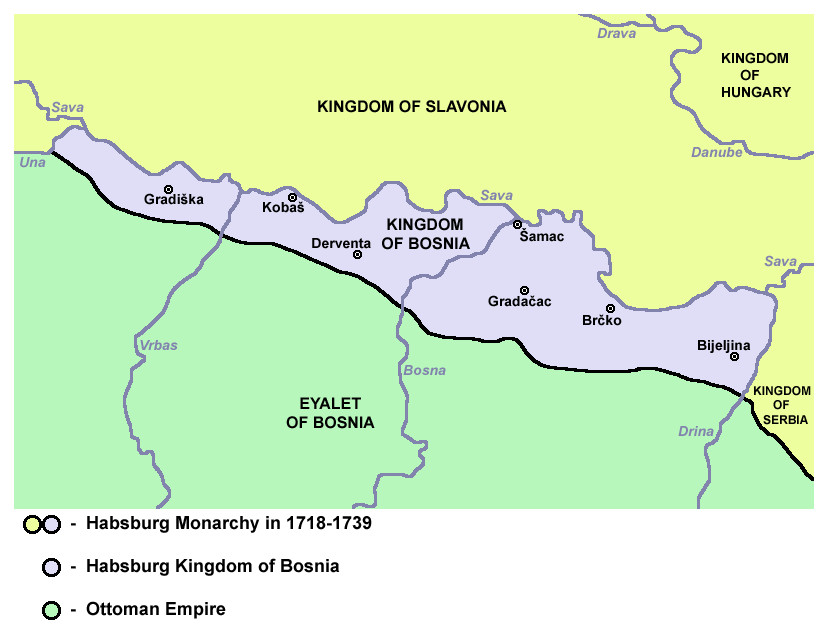
Region of Bosnian Posavina, assigned to Habsburg monarchy by the Treaty of Passarowitz

The Ottoman Empire after the Treaty of Passarowitz

The Treaty of Passarowitz, or Treaty of Požarevac, was the peace treaty signed in Požarevac (Serbian Cyrillic: Пожаревац, German: Passarowitz, Turkish: Pasarofça), a town that was in the Ottoman Empire but is now in Serbia, on 21 July 1718 between the Ottoman Empire and its adversaries, the Habsburg monarchy and the Republic of Venice.

The treaty saw the cession of several Ottoman territories to the Habsburgs, and it was regarded in its time as an extraordinary success and source of pride in Vienna. The treaty marked the end of Ottoman occupation within the Kingdom of Hungary with the cession of Belgrade, Syrmia and the Eyalet of Temesvár.

== Background ==
Between 1714 and 1718, the Ottomans had been successful against Venice in Ottoman Greece and Crete (Ottoman–Venetian War) but had been defeated at Petrovaradin (1716) by the Habsburg troops of Prince Eugene of Savoy (Austro-Turkish War of 1716–1718).

Peace was arranged with the intervention of Great Britain and the Dutch Republic, and the treaty was signed by Sir Robert Sutton and Jacob Colyer on behalf of their governments.

The other signatories were

- Damian Hugo, Count of Virmont and Michael von Talmann for the Habsburg monarchy,
- Vendramino Bianchi and Carlo Ruzzini for Venice
- Silindar Ibrahim–aga and Mehmed–efendija for the Ottoman Empire.

== Terms ==
The Ottoman Empire lost the Banat of Temeswar, western Wallachia, northern Serbia (including the fortress town of Belgrade), and northern part of Bosnia, namely the region of Posavina to the Habsburgs. The Habsburgs also received assurances that their merchants could operate in the Ottoman domain and that Catholic priests would regain revoked privileges, which allowed the Habsburg emperor to interfere in Ottoman affairs through connections with the church community and by championing the Catholic faith.

Venice ceded the Morea, its last remaining outposts in Crete, and the islands of Aegina and Tinos. Venice retained only the Ionian Islands (with Ottoman-occupied Kythira added to them), and the cities of Preveza and Arta on the Epirote mainland. In Dalmatia, Venice made some small gains by taking the areas of Imotski and Vrgorac in the Hinterland.

== Aftermath ==
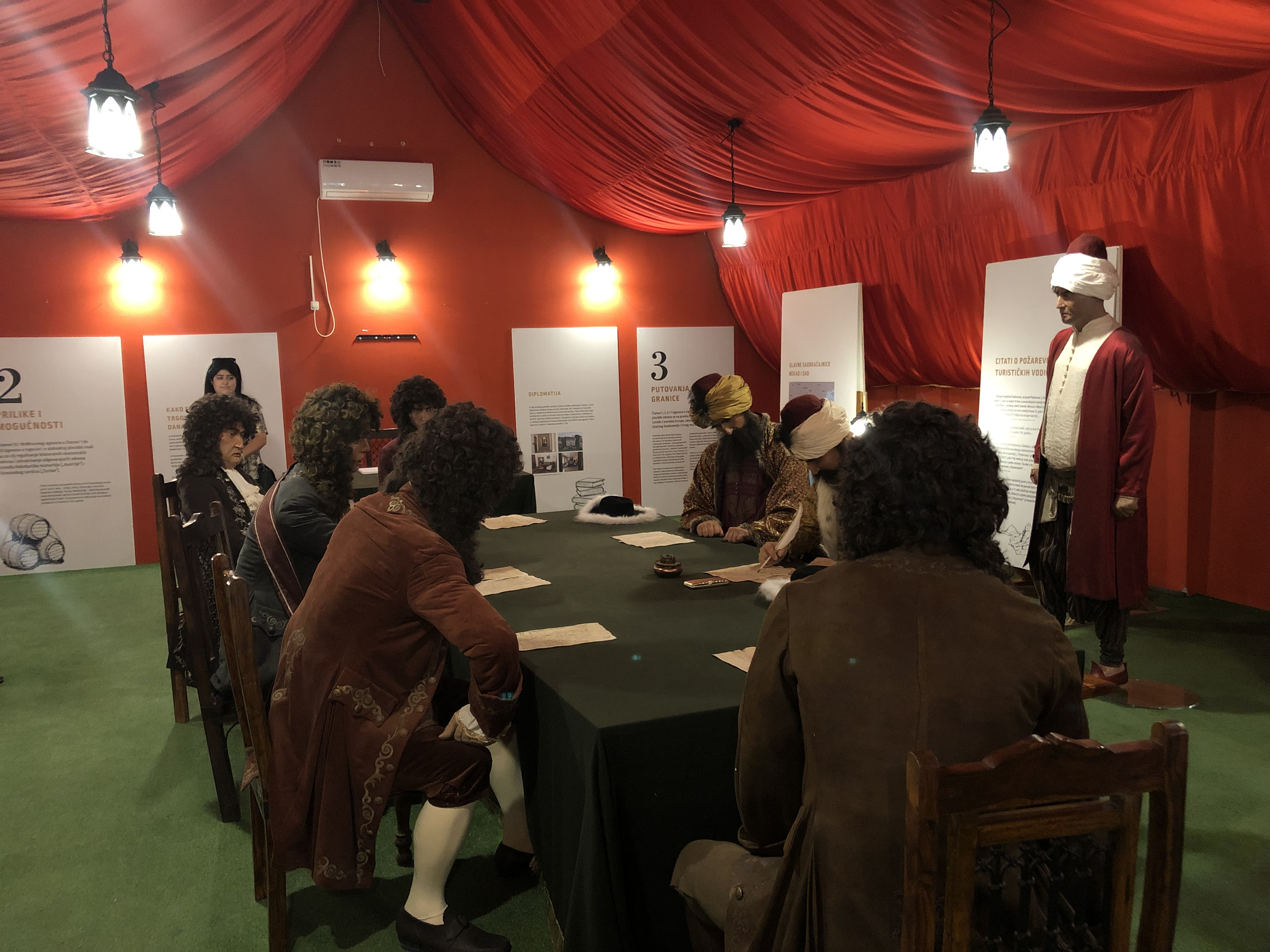
An exhibition in ethno-park Tulba near Požarevac showing how the treaty was signed.

The treaty gave the Habsburgs control over the northern part of present-day Serbia, which they had temporarily occupied during the Great Turkish War between 1688 and 1690. The Habsburgs established the Kingdom of Serbia as a crown land. The Habsburgs also formed the Banat into another crown land.

Habsburg control lasted 21 years, until the Turks won the Austro-Russian–Turkish War (1735–39). In the 1739 Treaty of Belgrade, the Ottoman Empire regained northern Bosnia, Habsburg Serbia (including Belgrade) and southern parts of the Banat of Temeswar, and Oltenia was returned to Wallachia.

== See also ==
- List of treaties

== Sources ==
- Ágoston, Gábor (2011). "The Ottoman Wars and the Changing Balance of Power along the Danube in the Early Eighteenth Century". The Peace of Passarowitz, 1718. West Lafayette: Purdue University Press. pp. 93–108. ISBN 978-1-61249-195-0.
- Ćirković, Sima (2004). The Serbs. Malden: Blackwell Publishing. ISBN 978-1-4051-4291-5.
- Dabić, Vojin S. (2011). "The Habsburg-Ottoman War of 1716-1718 and Demographic Changes in the War-Afflicted Territories". The Peace of Passarowitz, 1718. West Lafayette: Purdue University Press. pp. 191–208. ISBN 978-1-61249-195-0.
- Heppner, Harald; Schanes, Daniela (2011). "The Impact of the Treaty of Passarowitz on the Habsburg Monarchy". The Peace of Passarowitz, 1718. West Lafayette: Purdue University Press. pp. 53–62. ISBN 978-1-61249-195-0.
- Hochedlinger, Michael (2013). Austria's Wars of Emergence: War, State and Society in the Habsburg Monarchy, 1683–1797. London & New York: Routledge. ISBN 978-1-317-88793-5.
- Murphey, Rhoads (2011). "Twists and Turns in the Diplomatic Dialogue: the Politics of Peacemaking in the Early Eighteenth Century". The Peace of Passarowitz, 1718. West Lafayette: Purdue University Press. pp. 73–91. ISBN 978-1-61249-195-0.
- Peters, Martin (2011). "The Peace of Passarowitz in the Historical Sciences, 1718-1829". The Peace of Passarowitz, 1718. West Lafayette: Purdue University Press. pp. 39–50. ISBN 978-1-61249-195-0.
- Shapira, Dan D. Y. (2011). "The Crimean Tatars and the Austro-Ottoman Wars". The Peace of Passarowitz, 1718. West Lafayette: Purdue University Press. pp. 131–140. ISBN 978-1-61249-195-0.
- Setton, Kenneth Meyer (1991). Venice, Austria, and the Turks in the Seventeenth Century. Philadelphia: American Philosophical Society. ISBN 0871691922.
