= Kingdom of Serbia (1718–1739) =

Crownland of the Habsburg monarchy

Kingdom of Serbia Königreich Serbien (German) Краљевина Србија (Serbian) Kraljevina Srbija (Serbian)
- 1718–1739
- Flag Coat of arms

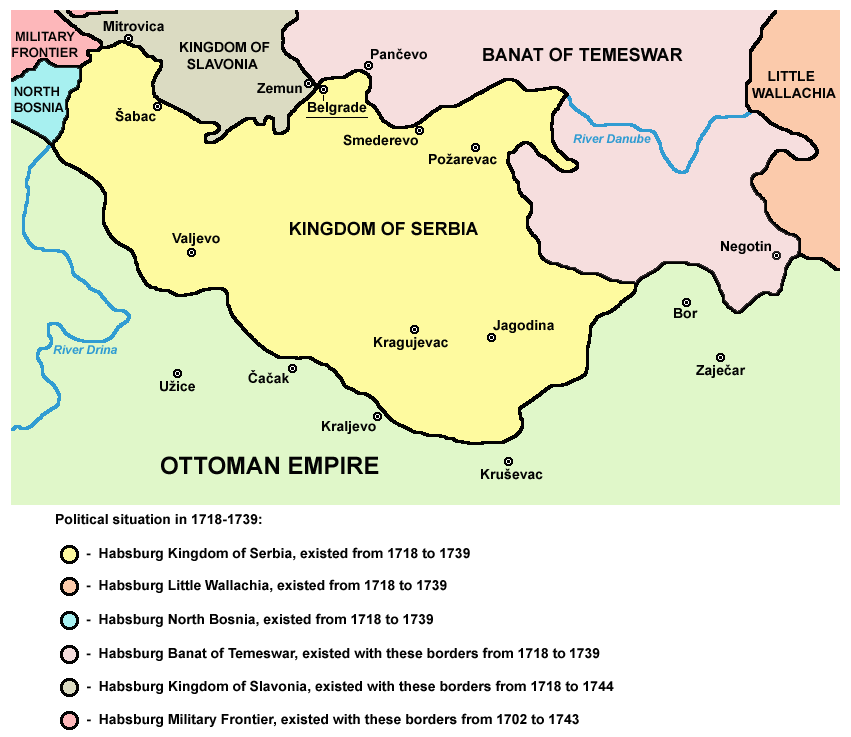
- Kingdom of Serbia (1718–1739)
- Status: Crownland of the Habsburg monarchy
- Capital: Belgrade
- Common languages: Serbian, German
- Religion: Roman Catholic, Serbian Orthodox
- Governor
  - 1718–1720: Johann O'Dwyer
  - 1738–1739: George de Wallis
- Historical era: Early modern period
  - Treaty of Passarowitz: 21 July 1718
  - Austro-Turkish War: 1737–39
  - Treaty of Belgrade: 18 September 1739
- Currency: Kreuzer
Preceded by	Succeeded by
Sanjak of Smederevo	Sanjak of Smederevo
- Today part of: Serbia

The Kingdom of Serbia (Serbian: Краљевина Србија / Kraljevina Srbija, German: Königreich Serbien, Latin: Regnum Serviae) was a province (crownland) of the Habsburg monarchy from 1718 to 1739. It was formed from the territories to the south of the rivers Sava and Danube, corresponding approximately to the Sanjak of Smederevo, an Ottoman province that was conquered by the Habsburgs in 1717, during the Habsburg-Ottoman war (1716–1718). The Kingdom existed until the next Habsburg-Ottoman War (1737-1739), when it was returned to the Ottoman rule in 1739.

During Habsburg rule, the Serbian majority did benefit from self-government, including an autonomous militia, and economic integration with the Habsburg monarchy - reforms that contributed to the growth of the Serb middle class and continued by the Ottomans "in the interest of law and order". Serbia's population increased rapidly from 270,000 to 400,000, but the decline of Habsburg power in the region provoked the second of the Great Migrations of the Serbs (1737–1739).

== History ==
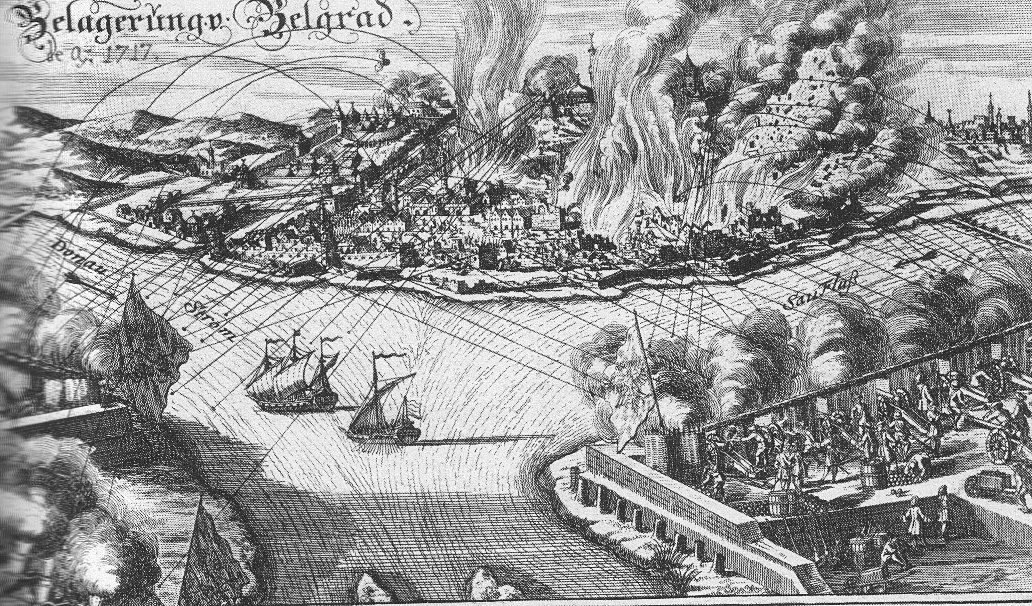
Siege of Belgrade (1717)

In 1688–1689, during the Great Turkish War, the Habsburg troops temporarily took control over most of present-day Serbia, but were subsequently forced into retreat. The Treaty of Karlowitz in 1699 recognized Ottoman authority over most of present-day Serbia, while the region of Bačka and the western part of Syrmia were assigned to the Habsburgs.

Another Austro-Turkish war broke out in 1716–1718, in which Serbs massively joined the Habsburg troops. After the gains of 1718 (following the Treaty of Passarowitz), the Habsburgs sought to integrate Serbia into their empire. The land was officially named the "Kingdom of Serbia", because it was neither a part of the Holy Roman Empire nor the Kingdom of Hungary. The actual administration of the province was in the hands of an appointed governor. Not all the Serb-inhabited territory south of the Sava and Danube rivers that was conquered by the Habsburgs in 1718 was included in the Kingdom of Serbia. A large eastern area was administratively separate as part of the Banat of Temeswar.

During the Austro-Turkish War (1737–1739), the Habsburg monarchy lost all territories south of the Sava and Danube, including the whole territory of the Kingdom of Serbia, and Orșova north of the Danube. It retained, however, the rest of the Banat of Temeswar. The breakout of war and consequent end of Habsburg rule resulted in the second Great Migration of the Serbs (1737–1739).

== Government ==
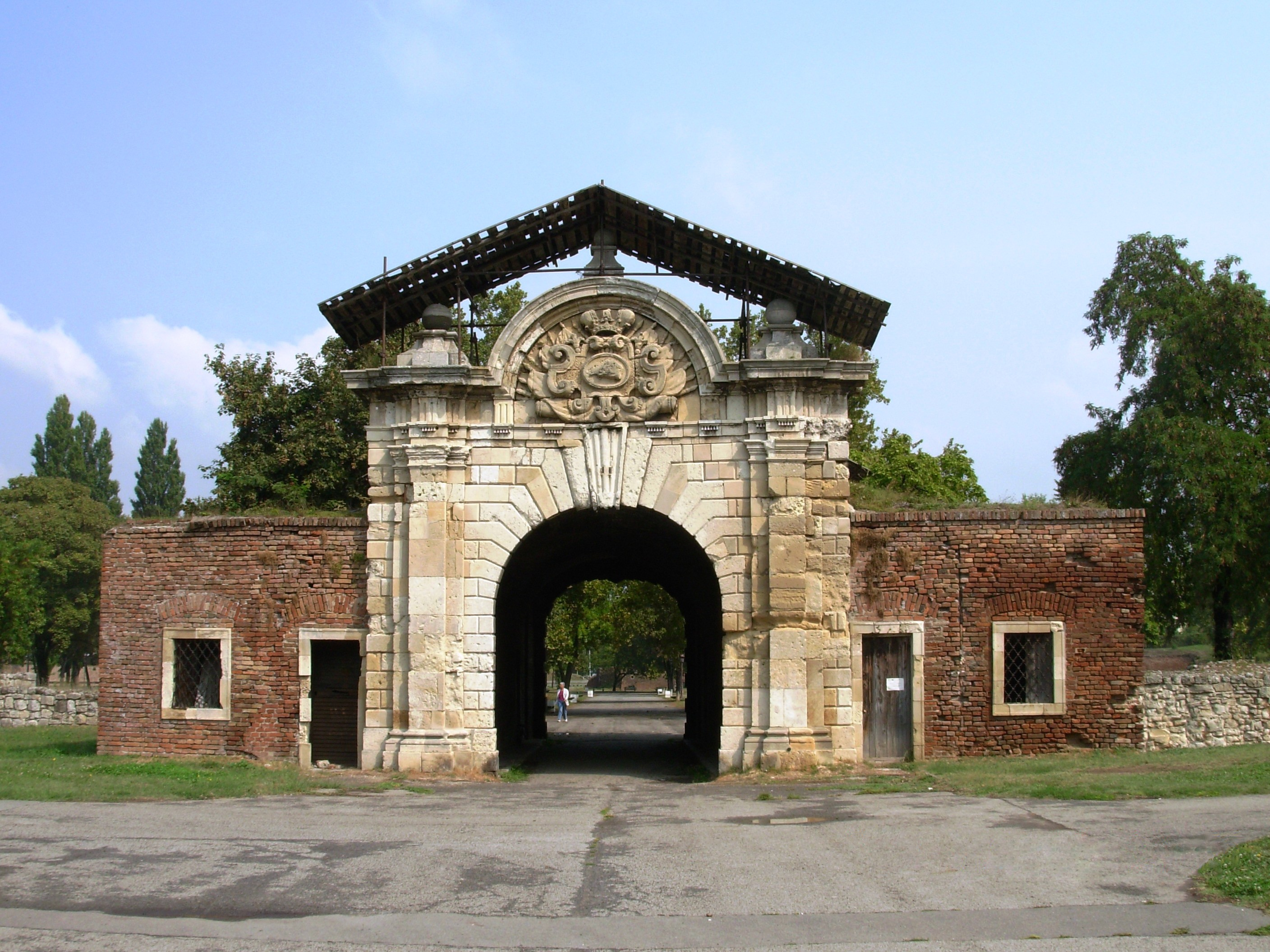
Gate of Charles VI

Serbia was jointly supervised by the Aulic War Council and the Aulic Chamber, and subordinated to a local military-cameral administration.

Governors

- Johann Joseph Anton O'Dwyer (1718–1720) (known as "General Odijer")
- Charles Alexander (1720–1733)
- Karl Christoph von Schmettau (1733–1738)
- George Oliver de Wallis (1738–1739)

== Serbian Militia ==
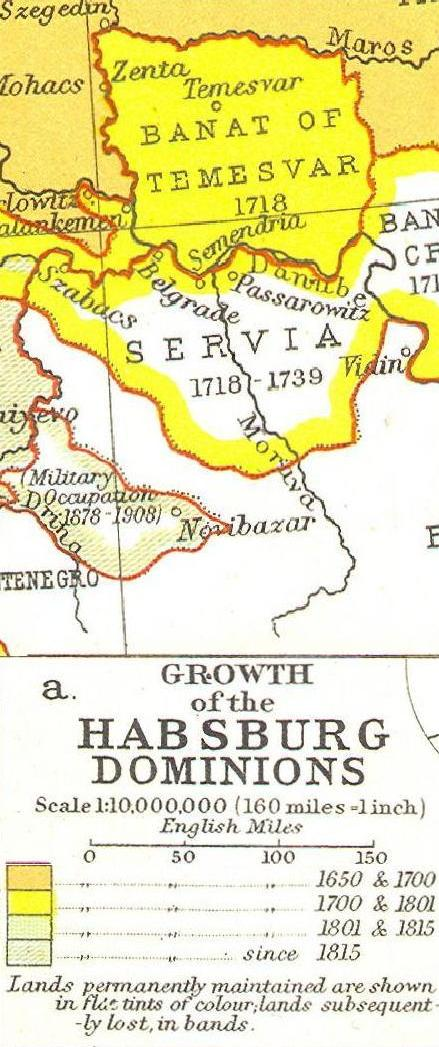
Growth of the Habsburg monarchy showing Serbia in 1718–1739.

There was a portion of the Serbian peasant population that had a military obligation (and were not taxed as the rest of the agricultural population), known as the hajduks. They formed the "Serbian national militia" that fought the Ottoman troops, and were exempt from tax in exchange for their military service, which included defending the borderlands, keeping peace, and maintaining and protecting the Great Road. These hajduks constituted a privileged class in the kingdom, and received the most fertile lands for their settlements (which were separate from other villages)

== Economy ==
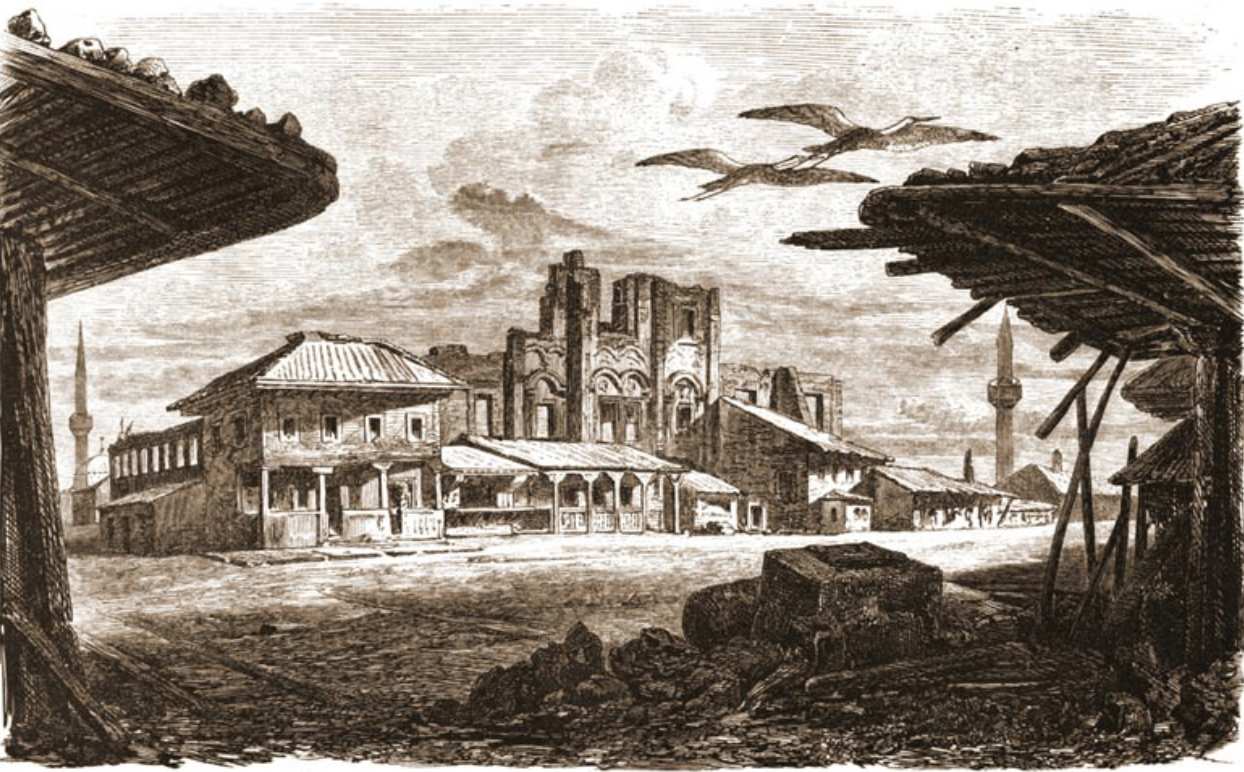
The ruins of Prince Eugen's Palace in Belgrade, built during Habsburg rule, depicted by Felix Philipp Kanitz in 1860

The economy of the Kingdom of Serbia was highly agricultural in nature and included viticulture, cereal farming, and livestock breeding, though none of these reached a substantial scale for large-scale export. Beekeeping, however, constituted one of the most economically important sectors in the kingdom, with the production and sale of honey and beeswax accounting for about one-third of tax revenue paid to Habsburg authorities. The government granted mining concessions to new joint-stock companies, including the Caesarea privilegiata Societas Commerciorum Orientalium, whose largest shareholders were Charles Alexander and his wife, the Orthodox Metropolitanate of Belgrade, and the urban German community of Belgrade as a whole. Projects were also undertaken to expand the forestry sector through reforestation of certain areas.

== Demographics ==
A 1720 regulation declared that Belgrade was to be settled mainly by Germans, while the Serbs were to live outside the city walls in the "Rascian" part. It has been estimated that the population in Belgrade in the 1720s did not exceed 20,000. The population increased rapidly from 270,000 to 400,000, but the end of Habsburg power in the region resulted in the second Great Serb Migration (1737–1739).

Religious policies of Habsburg authorities towards various Christian communities were implemented by recognizing the Serbian Orthodox Metropolitanate of Belgrade, and also by establishing the Roman Catholic Diocese of Belgrade.

== Aftermath ==
Although the Habsburg administration over this part of present-day Serbia was short-lived, the consciousness about separate political entity was left behind by the Habsburgs, thus local inhabitants never again fully accepted Ottoman administration, which led to Koča's frontier rebellion in 1788 and to the First Serbian Uprising in 1804, that ended direct Ottoman rule over this part of present-day Serbia.

== Sources ==
- Ágoston, Gábor (2011). "The Ottoman Wars and the Changing Balance of Power along the Danube in the Early Eighteenth Century". The Peace of Passarowitz, 1718. West Lafayette: Purdue University Press. pp. 93–108. ISBN 978-1-61249-195-0.
- Bataković, Dušan T., ed. (2005). Histoire du peuple serbe [History of the Serbian People] (in French). Lausanne: L’Age d’Homme. ISBN 9782825119587.
- Ćirković, Sima (2004). The Serbs. Malden: Blackwell Publishing. ISBN 9781405142915.
- Dabić, Vojin S. (2011). "The Habsburg-Ottoman War of 1716-1718 and Demographic Changes in the War-Afflicted Territories". The Peace of Passarowitz, 1718. West Lafayette: Purdue University Press. pp. 191–208. ISBN 978-1-61249-195-0.
- Hochedlinger, Michael (2013). Austria's Wars of Emergence: War, State and Society in the Habsburg Monarchy, 1683–1797. London & New York: Routledge. ISBN 978-1-317-88793-5.
- Hupchick, Dennis P. (2004). The Balkans: From Constantinople to Communism. Palgrave Macmillan. ISBN 978-1-4039-6417-5.
- Ingrao, Charles; Samardžić, Nikola; Pešalj, Jovan, eds. (2011). The Peace of Passarowitz, 1718. West Lafayette: Purdue University Press. ISBN 9781557535948.
- Mitrović, Katarina (2011). "The Peace of Passarowitz and the Re-establishment of the Catholic Diocesan Administration in Belgrade and Smederevo". The Peace of Passarowitz, 1718. West Lafayette: Purdue University Press. pp. 209–217.
- Nedeljković, Slaviša; Đorđević, Miloš (2015). "The Habsburg Monarchy and Serbs in the Ottoman Empire up Until the Congress of Vienna (1739-1815)" (PDF). Limes plus: Geopolitički časopis. 12 (3): 23–37. Archived from the original on 2020-07-12.
- Točanac-Radović, Isidora (2018). "Belgrade - Seat of the Archbishopric and Metropolitanate (1718–1739)". Belgrade 1521-1867. Belgrade: The Institute of History. pp. 155–167. ISBN 978-86-7743-132-7.
