= Karl A. Roider Jr. =

Karl A. Roider Jr. is the Louisiana State University, Thomas and Lillian Landrum Alumni Professor. Roider joined the LSU faculty in 1968. He was appointed as the Dean of LSU's College of Arts and Sciences in December 1991 and served in this role for nine years. Roider returned to his role as a history professor before retiring in the spring of 2014.

Roider's academic specialization is in the study of the Balkans. His books include The Reluctant Ally: Austria's Policy in the Austro-Turkish War, 1737-1739 (1972), Austria's Eastern Question, 1700-1790 (1982), Baron Thugut and Austria's Response to the French Revolution (1987), and a biography of Maria Theresa of Austria.

== Education ==
Ada High School, 1961
A.B. Yale University 1965
M.A. Stanford University 1966
Ph.D. Stanford University 1970

== Awards and honors ==
- Thomas and Lillian Landrum Alumni Professor of History
- Younger Humanist Fellow, National Endowment for the Humanities
- Fulbright Scholar
- American Philosophical Society scholar
- Ada Schools, Hall of Honor
- Commander's Award for Public Service

== Notable articles ==
Forewords to:

- Ella Schneider Hilton, Displaced Person: A Girl's Life in Russia, Germany, and America (LSU Press, 2004)
- E.M. Forster, ed., The Turkish Letters of Ogiev Ghiselin de Busberg (LSU Press, 2005)

== Books ==
- The Reluctant Ally: Austria’s Policy in the Austro-Turkish War, 1737-1739 (Louisiana State University Press, 1972)
- Maria Theresa (Prentice-Hall, 1973—Editor)
- Austria’s Eastern Question, 1700-1790 (Princeton University Press, 1982)
- Baron Thugut and Austria’s Response to the French Revolution (Princeton University Press, 1987)
