= Vasily Dolgorukov-Krymsky =

Russian general (1722–1782)

Prince Vasily Dolgorukov-Krymsky
- Василий Долгоруков-Крымский
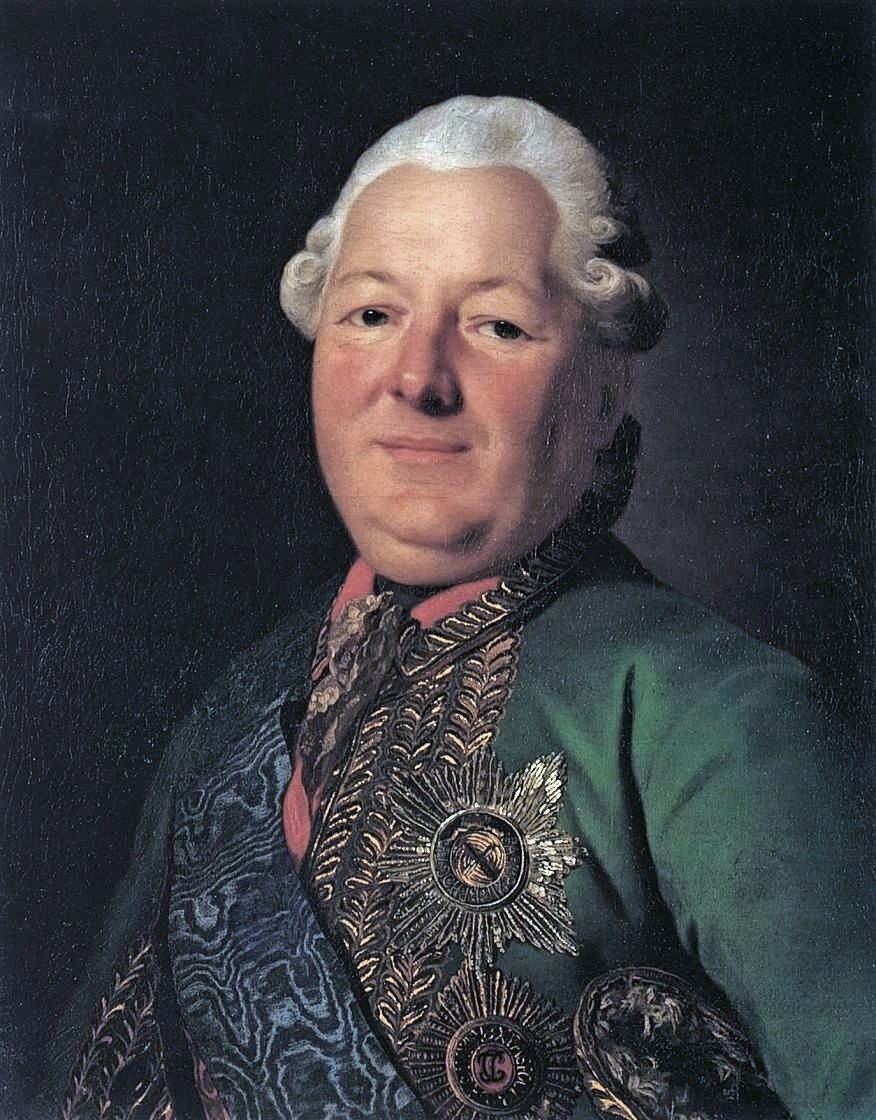
- Portrait by Alexander Roslin (1776)
- Born: July 12, 1722
- Died: February 10, 1782 (aged 59); Moscow, Russia
- Relatives: V. V. Dolgorukov (nephew)
- Family: Dolgorukov
- Awards: St. Alexander Nevsky (1759); St. Andrew (1767); St. George I Class (1775)

Commander-in-Chief of Moscow
- In office 22 April 1780 – 10 February 1782
- Monarch: Catherine II

Military service
- Years of service: 1735–1782
- Rank: General-in-Chief
- Battles/wars: Expand: Russo-Turkish War (1735–1739); Siege of Perekop; Siege of Ochakov; Khotin; Russo-Swedish War (1741–1743); Vilajoki; Seven Years' War; Siege of Küstrin; Battle of Zorndorf; Siege of Kolberg; Russo-Turkish War (1768–1774); Siege of Kinburn; Capture of Kefe

Prince Vasily Mikhailovich Dolgorukov-Krymsky (Russian: Василий Михайлович Долгоруков-Крымский; 12 July [O.S. 1 July] 1722 – 10 February [O.S. 30 January] 1782) was a Russian statesman, general, and the commander-in-chief of Moscow from 1780 to 1782. Already a seasoned veteran of several wars, he was a senior military commander of the Russo-Turkish War of 1768–1774, where his forces occupied the Crimean Khanate, from which he derived his honorary title of "Krymsky" (actually means "of Crimea").

He was the original builder and owner of the House of the Unions and numerous other historic mansions that dot the city of Moscow.

== Biography ==
Vasily Mikhailovich was the son of senator and governor of Prince Mikhail Vladimirovich Dolgorukov from his marriage to Princess Yevdokiya Yurievna Odoyevskaya. His childhood was marked by the disgrace and imprisonment of his uncle Vasily Vladimirovich Dolgorukov under the reign of Empress Anna Ioannovna, which affected the entire family. Vasily Mikhailovich was inducted into the military as a private in 1735 at the age of 13, where he gained his first combat experience fighting under Field Marshal Burkhard Christoph von Münnich in the Crimea. He would distinguish himself at the Siege of Perekop. Before the storming of the fortress, Münnich promised that the first soldier to ascend the fortifications alive would be promoted to officer. Young Dolgorukov would prove to be that soldier, and was given the rank of poruchik.

When Anna had ascended the throne, she had ordered that no one from the Dolgorukov family be granted officer rank in the military, that they could only be allowed in the enlisted ranks. According to research by Valentin Pikul, Münnich reported the events of the siege to the Empress in person, including his act of promoting Vasily. Anna simply replied to her general, "Do not take away my sword from this suckling", and so Vasily Mikhailovich became the only member of his entire noble clan to be exempted from the ban during her ten-year reign.

Under the rule of Elizabeth Petrovna, Dolgorukov would find himself promoted rapidly through the ranks. In 1741 he would be made a captain, and by 1745 would be a lieutenant-colonel and adjutant to his now rehabilitated uncle Vasily Vladamirovich, who had been appointed president of the Collegium of War, the body that oversaw the entire Imperial Army. In 1747 he was made a full colonel and given command over his own regiment, the Tobolsk Infantry. According to the recollections of Prince Yakov Shakhovskoy, which he cited from his personal notes, Dolgorukov conspicuously studied from his fellow commanders to improve his knowledge of military affairs.

He made a great contribution to the preparation of the "opening" of Moscow Governorate according to the provisions of the reforms of governorates in 1775 in accordance with the decree of Empress Catherine II. He won the respect of Muscovites due to his honesty and availability for appeals. The correspondence of Catherine II with Dolgorukov-Krymsky for 1780–82 (25 letters) has survived.

== Seven Years' War ==
Dolgorukov, now a major-general, served in the Seven Years' War, distinguishing himself at both the Siege of Küstrin and the subsequent Battle of Zorndorf in August 1758. For the valor he demonstrated at Küstrin, he would later be promoted to lieutenant-general and awarded the Order of Alexander Nevsky. Towards the end of this campaign Dolgorukov was wounded in the leg by canister shot, and had to seek treatment for his injury, but the General recovered in time to lead an infantry brigade at the Kunersdorf. He was also present at the Third Siege of Kolberg as one of Rumyanstev's subordinates. When Catherine the Great took power towards the end of the war, she made a point of favoring Dolgorukov for his service, having him promoted to general-in-chief on the day of her formal coronation. In 1767 she would award him the Order of St. Andrew, the highest order of knighthood in the Russian Empire.

== Russo-Turkish War of 1768–1774 ==
In 1769 Prince Dolgorukov was assigned the mission to cordon off the border between the Russia and the Crimean Khanate with his detachment of troops. The next year he succeeded Petr Ivanovich Panin as commander of the 2nd Field Army (38,000).

In 1771 he was sent to conquer the Khanate: on June 25 he captured the fortifications of the Isthmus of Perekop, on July 10 he defeated the Tatar-Turkish army (95,000) at Kefe (now Feodosia); after this victory the Turks left the towns of Arabat, Yeni-Kale, Kerch, Balaklava and others. As a result Crimea was actually conquered by Russia, Russian protégé Şahin Giray became khan (the final annexation of the Crimean Khanate took place in 1783).

During the celebration of the Treaty of Küçük Kaynarca of 1774, held 21-07-1775, Dolgorukov was granted a sword decorated with diamonds, and the addition of "Krymsky" to the family name. However, resenting the fact that he was not granted a field marshal, Dolgorukov-Krymsky retired and began to improve his Znamenskoye-Gubailovo and Volynshchina estates near Moscow.

== Sources ==
- "ДОЛГОРУКОВ-КРЫМСКИЙ ВАСИЛИЙ МИХАЙЛОВИЧ • Great Russian Encyclopedia – Electronic version". old.bigenc.ru. 2023.
