= Khotyn Fortress =

Fortress complex in Chernivtsi Oblast, Ukraine

- Хотинська фортеця
- Dniester Raion, Chernivtsi Oblast in Ukraine
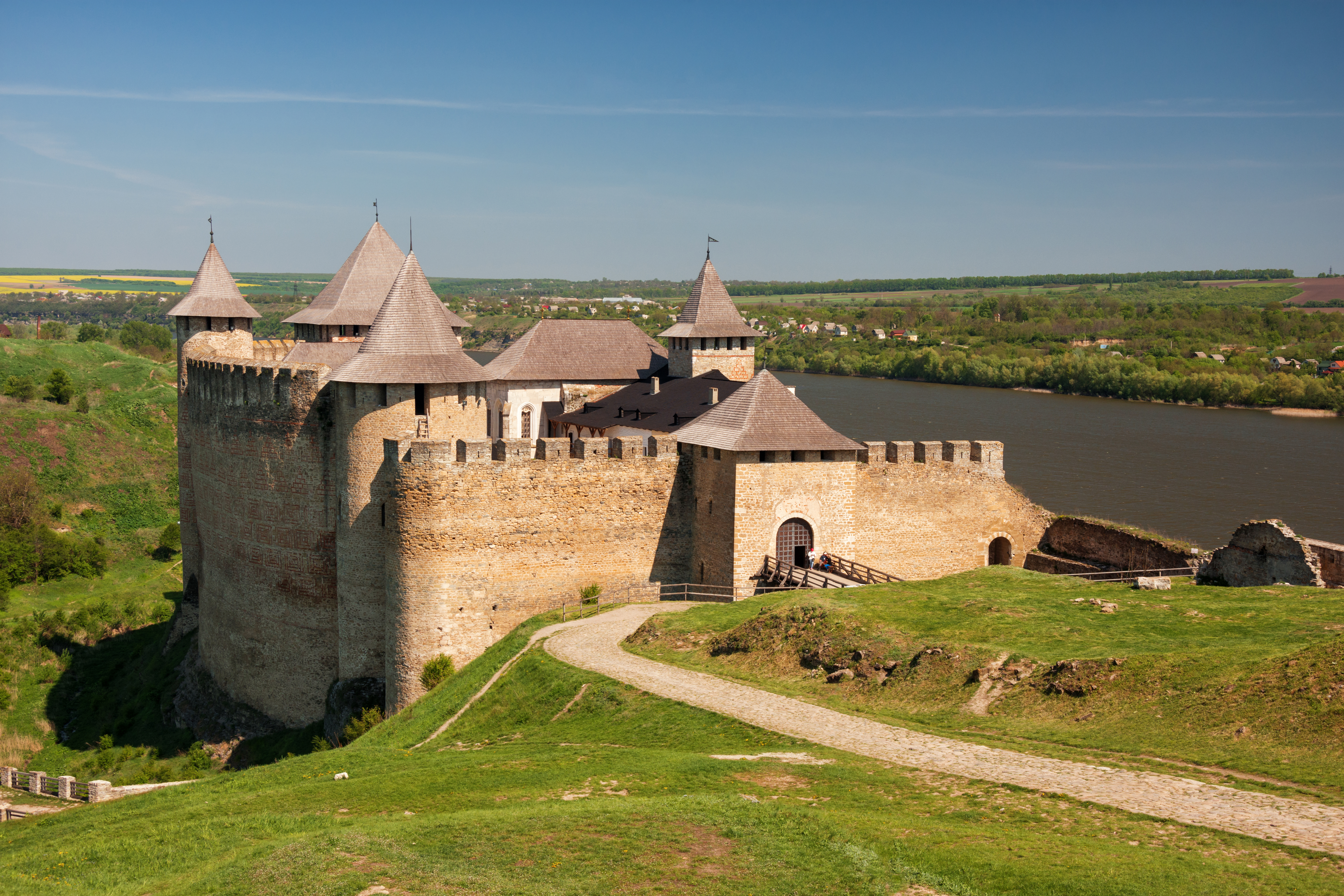
- Entrance view of the Khotyn Fortress

Site information
- Type: Fort
- Website: https://khotynska-fortecya.cv.ua/index-en

Location
- Coordinates: 48°31′19″N 26°29′54″E

Site history
- Built: Fortress

Immovable Monument of National Significance of Ukraine
- Official name: Комплекс споруд Хотинської фортеці (Building complex of the Khotyn Fortress)
- Type: Architecture, Urban Planning, History, Archaeology, Monumental Art
- Reference no.: 240081-Н

The Khotyn Fortress (Ukrainian: Хотинська фортеця; Romanian: Cetatea Hotinului; Polish: twierdza w Chocimiu; Turkish: Hotin Kalesi) is a fortification complex located on the right bank of the Dniester River in Khotyn, Chernivtsi Oblast (province) of southwestern Ukraine. It lies within the historical region of northern Bessarabia, a formerly Romanian territory occupied in 1940 by the Soviet Union following the Molotov–Ribbentrop Pact. The fortress is located near another famous defensive structure, the Kamianets-Podilskyi Castle. Construction of the current stone Khotyn Fortress began in the late XIV century, when these lands had already become part of Moldavia. The fortress underwent significant improvements in the 1380s and in the 1460s under the Romanian princes Alexander the Good and Stephen the Great.

== History ==
=== As a Rus' stronghold ===
The Khotyn Fortress' beginning goes back to the Khotyn Fort, which was built in the 10th century by Prince Vladimir the Great as one of the border fortifications of southwestern Kievan Rus', after he added the land of present-day Bukovina to his control. The fort, which eventually was rebuilt a fortress, was located on important commerce routes, which connected Scandinavia and Kyiv with the Ponyzia (lowlands), Podolia, Genoese and Greek colonies on the Black Sea, through Moldavia and Wallachia, on the famous "trade route from the Varangians to the Greeks".

The fortification was located on a rocky territory, created by the tall right-hand shore of the Dniester and the valley. At first it was just a huge mound of dirt with wooden walls and protective equipment. It was designed to protect the settlement of Khotyn across the river. The first stone construction was rather small. It was located exactly where the northern tower is located today. Throughout the centuries, this fortress underwent many reconstructions and expansions, and was damaged by new conquerors, who would later rebuild it.

By the late 11th century, Khotyn Fortress was under the control of the Principality of Terebovlia. In the 1140s, the fortress was incorporated into the Principality of Halych, and by 1199 became part of the Kingdom of Galicia–Volhynia.

=== Reconstruction and fortification ===
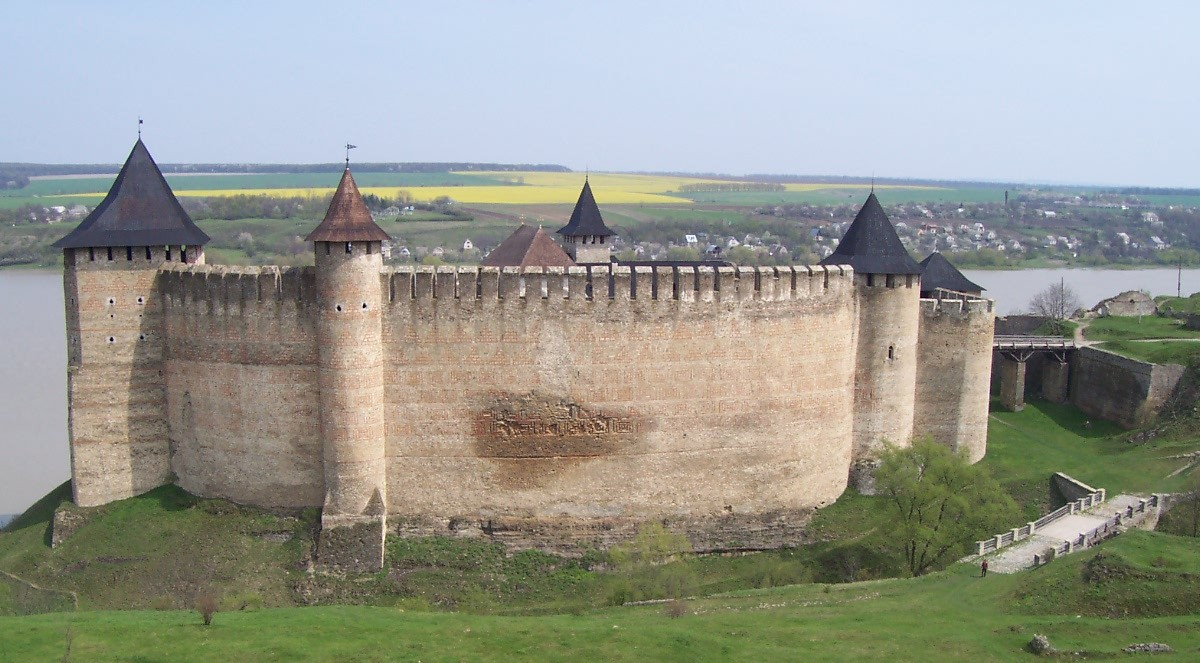
Panoramic view of the fortress's walls

Between 1250 and 1264, Prince Danylo of Halych and his son Lev rebuilt the fortress. They fortified the structure by adding a half-meter (20 in) stone wall and a 6-meter (20 ft) wide moat around its perimeter. Additionally, new military buildings were constructed in the northern part of the fortress. In the latter half of the 13th century, the fortress was rebuilt by the Genoese.

In the 1340s, the fortress was captured by Moldavian prince Dragoș, a vassal of the Kingdom of Hungary. After 1375, it was incorporated into the Principality of Moldavia. Under the rule of Alexander the Good and later Stephen the Great of Moldavia, the fortress underwent significant renovations, transforming it into its present form. The old fortress was reconstructed using stone and extensively expanded. New walls were erected, measuring 5–6-meter (16–20 ft) wide and 40 meters (130 ft) tall. Three towers were added, and the courtyard was raised by 10 meters (33 ft). The courtyard itself was divided into sections for princes and soldiers, with deep basements serving as barracks. This reconstruction established the fortress's current structure. Throughout the 14th to 16th centuries, the fortress served as a residence for Moldavian princes.

In 1476, the garrison successfully held the Fortress against the Turkish army of Sultan Mehmed II. By the end of the 16th century Moldavia became a tributary principality of the Ottoman Empire. Thereafter, a janissary unit was stationed inside the fortress, alongside the Moldavian troops. During this time the Turks expanded and fortified the Fortress.

In 1538, the Khotyn Fortress was captured by Polish–Lithuanian Commonwealth forces under the leadership of Great Crown Hetman Jan Tarnowski. The Commonwealth troops undermined the fortress walls, destroying three towers and a section of the western wall. Following its capture, the fortress underwent renovations from 1540 to 1544. In 1563, Dmytro Vyshnevetsky and five hundred Zaporozhian Cossacks successfully captured the fortress, holding it for a period.

=== 17th to 19th centuries ===
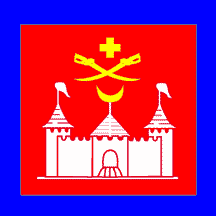
The Khotyn Fortress is represented on Khotyn's city flag.

In 1600, Simion Movilă, the former ruler of both Moldavia and Wallachia, along with his brother Ieremia Movilă, Prince of Moldavia, sought refuge in the Fortress. With Polish support, they engaged in a dynastic struggle against the forces of Moldavia and Wallachia, led by Michael the Brave, who was attempting to capture the fortress.

In 1611, Voivode Stefan Tomsa II ruled Moldova with the support of the Ottoman Empire, maintaining control of Khotyn Fortress until his deposition in 1615.

In 1615, the Polish army recaptured Khotyn, only to return it to the Ottoman Empire in 1617. The city was once more seized by the Polish army in 1620.

From September to October 1621, the Commonwealth army, led by hetman Jan Karol Chodkiewicz and Petro Sahaidachny, successfully defended against the army of the Turkish sultan, Osman II. The Commonwealth forces, numbering around 50,000 troops, held off the estimated 100,000-strong Ottoman army in the Battle of Khotyn. On October 8, 1621, the Khotyn Peace Treaty was signed, halting the Ottoman advance into the Commonwealth and confirming the Commonwealth–Ottoman border on the Dniester river (the border of the Principality of Moldavia). As a result, Khotyn was returned to Moldavia as a vassal of Ottoman empire.

Hetman Bohdan Khmelnytsky initially allied with the Principalities of Moldavia and Wallachia before occupying Khotyn Fortress for a period in the spring of 1650. During the Zhvanets Battle in 1653, fought on the left bank of Dniester, a garrison of Turks from Khotyn fought alongside Moldavian forces. In November 1673, the Khotyn Fortress was lost by the Turks. Jan Sobieski would begin to occupy Khotyn with a Polish–Cossack army. Sobieski vividly described the battle:

More than 60 guns were thundering non-stop, the sky was in flames and smothered in smoke, the earth was quaking, the walls were groaning, the rocks were splitting into pieces. That which my eyes captured throughout the day was indescribable. It is impossible to convey the persistence and courage, or rather despair, with which both parties were fighting.

In early August 1674, the fortress was captured back by Turkish forces. Jan Sobieski, then the Polish king, recaptured it in 1684.

With the 1699 Karlowitz Peace Treaty, the fortress was transferred from the Polish–Lithuanian Commonwealth to Moldavia. In 1711, Khotyn was again taken over by the Turks. The Turks then fortified Khotyn following a six-year (1712–18) reconstruction and it became the foremost stronghold of the Ottoman defence in Eastern Europe.

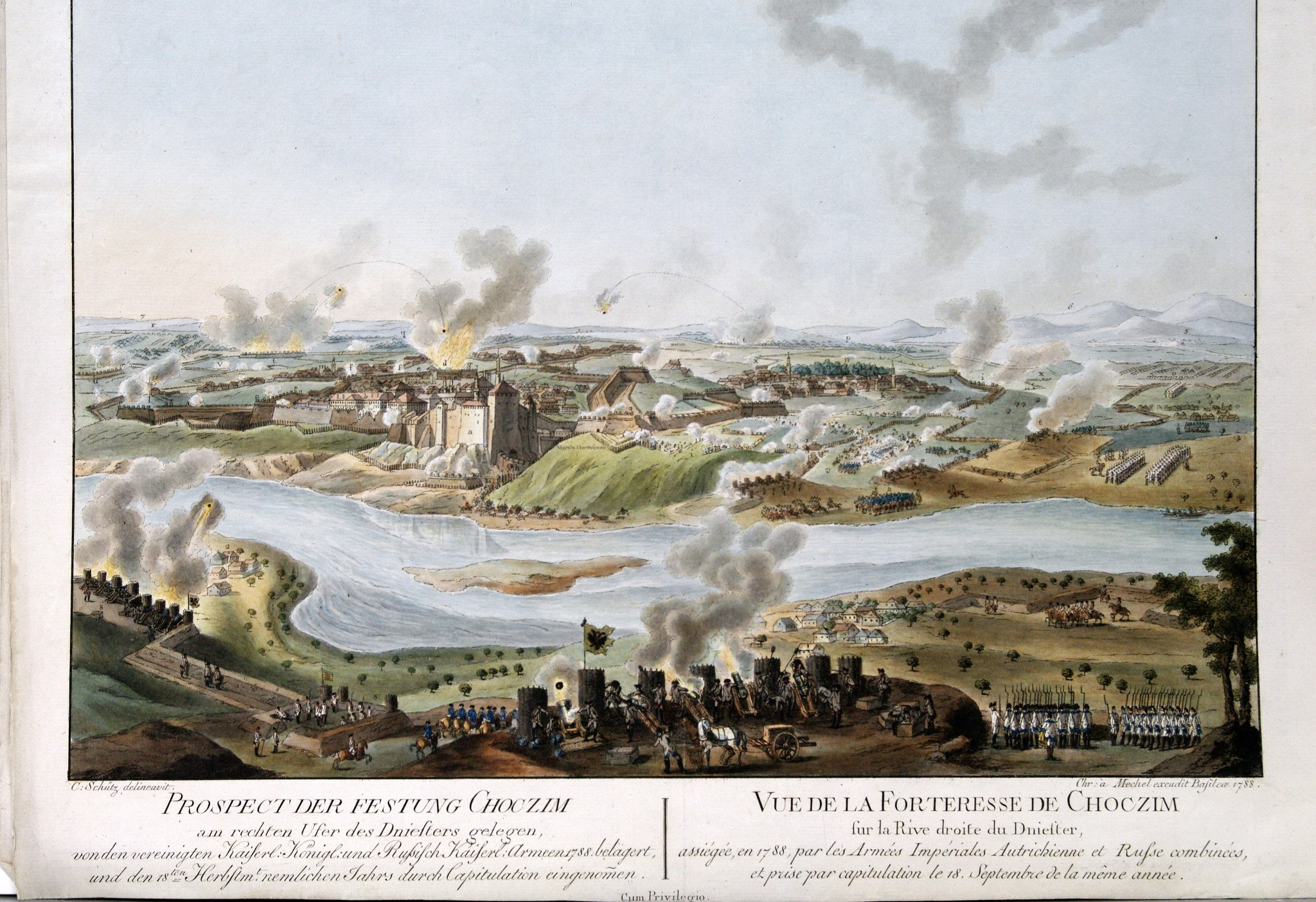
Austro-Russian siege of Khotyn, 1788

In 1739, after the Russians defeated the Turks in the Battle of Stavuchany (today Stavceane) in which Ukrainians, Russians, Georgians, and Moldavians fought, they laid siege on the Khotyn fortress. The commander of the Turkish forces, Iliaş Colceag surrendered the fortress to the Russian commander Burkhard Christoph von Münnich.

In 1769 and 1788, the Russians again successfully stormed the fortress, but every time it was given back according to peace treaties. Only after the Russo-Turkish War (1806-1812) did Khotyn become a permanent part of Russia and a district center in Bessarabia. However, when the Turks were retreating, they almost completely ruined the fortress.

In 1826, the city of Khotyn was given a coat of arms.

In 1832, the new church of St. Alexander Nevsky was built on the territory inside of the fortress.

In 1856, the government ended the status of the Khotyn Fortress as a military entity.

=== 20th and 21st centuries ===
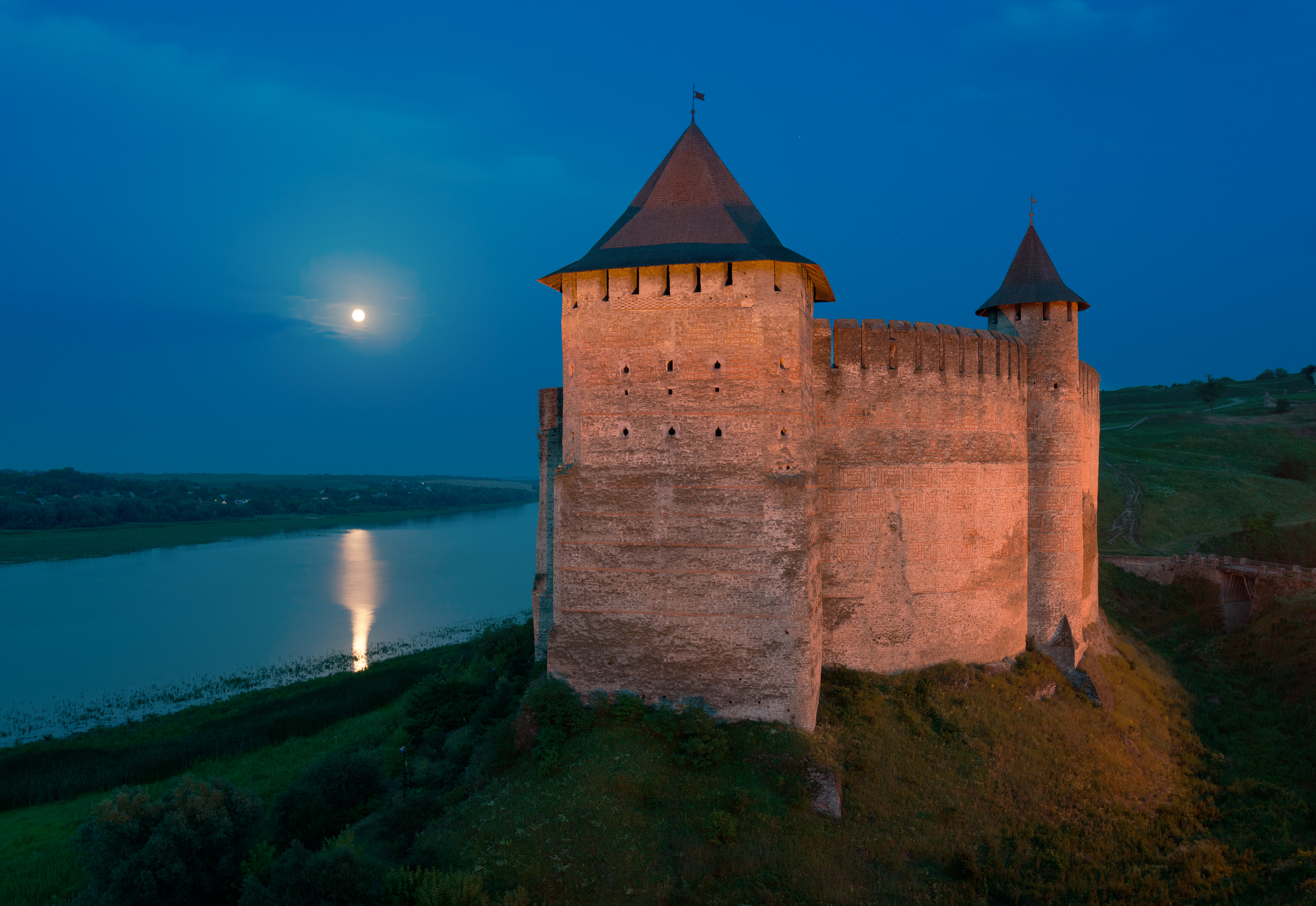
The fortress seen from north

The First World War and the Russian Civil War took a heavy toll on the people of Khotyn. In January 1918, the Moldovan Democratic Republic proclaimed its independence and in March, united with Romania.

In January 1919, an anti-Romanian uprising took place orchestrated by the bolsheviks from Russia. The Khotyn Directory gained authority in more than one hundred villages in the area and Y. I. Voloshenko-Mardaryev (Й. І. Волошенко-Мардар'єв) was in charge. The uprising lasted only ten days and on February 1, the Romanians got into Khotyn. Khotyn was internationally recognized as part of Romania after the Paris Peace Conference, remaining a part of Romania for 22 years, being the administrative center of the Hotin County.

On 28 of June 1940, Soviet Union occupied Bessarabia and Northern Bukovina and at the orders of Moscow, the northern part of Bessarabia, including the town of Khotyn was incorporated into the Ukrainian Soviet Socialist Republic. On July 6, 1941, Khotyn was reconquered by the Nazi German-Romanian armies, returning to Romania as part of the Bukovina Governorate. In the summer of 1944, the Red Army reoccupied the region.

In September 1991, during the 370th anniversary of the Battle of Khotyn, a monument was erected in honor of Ukrainian Hetman Petro Sahaidachnyi, designed by sculptor I. Hamal' (І. Гамаль). Today, Khotyn is one of the biggest cities and an important industrial, tourist, and cultural center of the Chernivtsi Oblast. Taking into consideration the rich historical traditions of the city, the Khotyn Fortress State Historical and Architectural Reserve was created by the Cabinet of Ministers of Ukraine in 2000. In September 2002, the ancient city celebrated its 1,000-year anniversary.

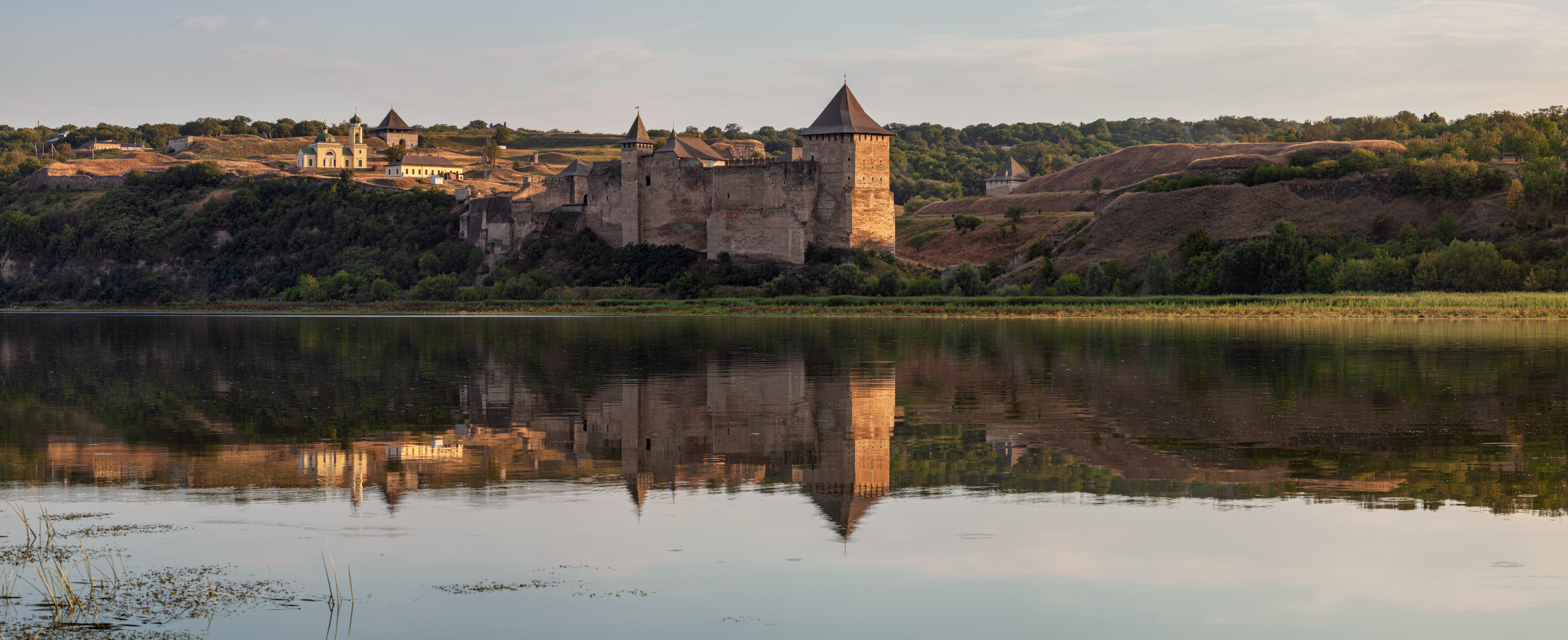
Panorama of the fortress in evening light, July 2016
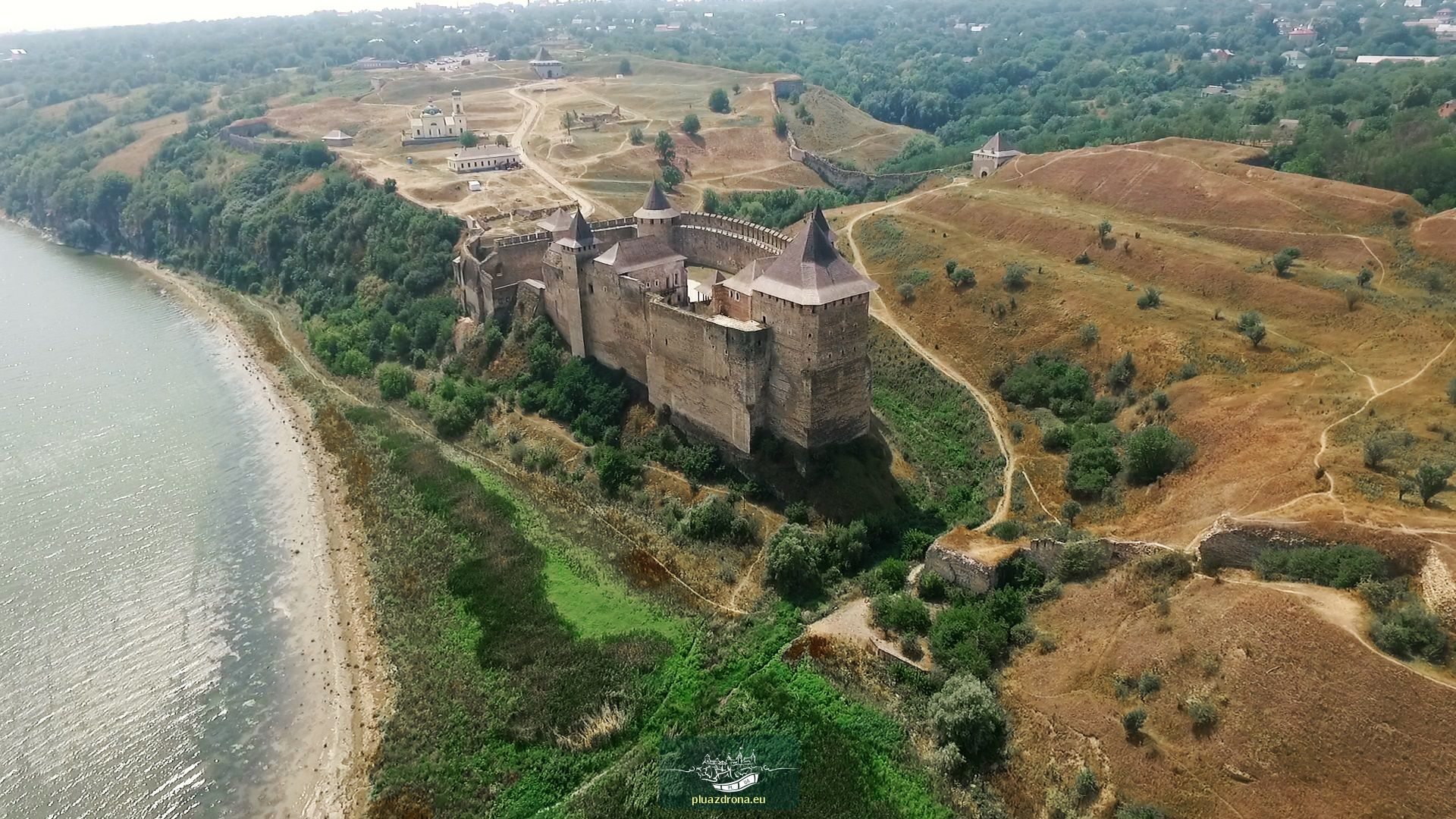
Khotyn fortress screened from a drone

== Khotyn Fortress in films ==
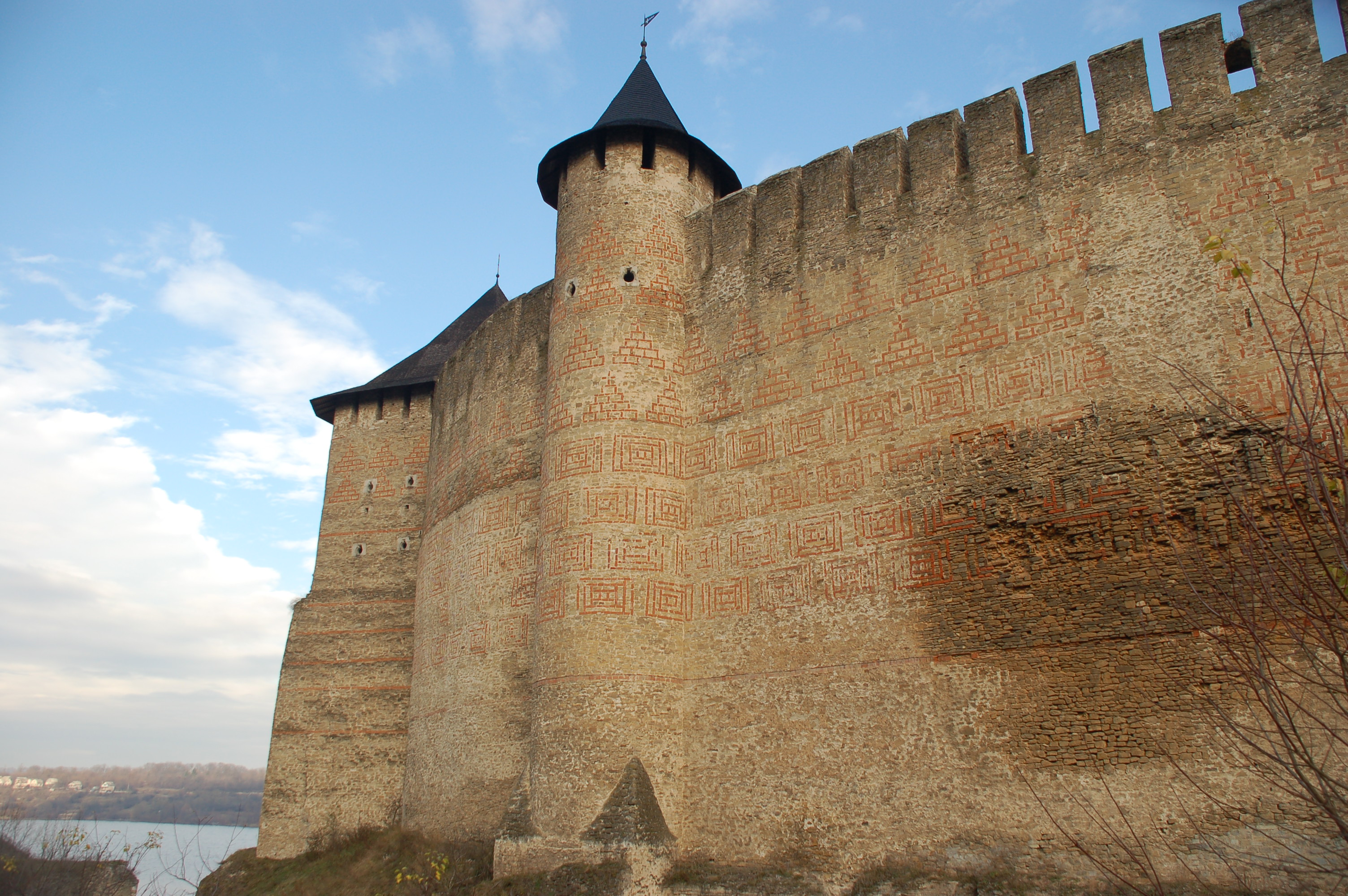
Close up view of the dark spot

Many historical adventure movies were filmed in the Khotyn fortress: The Viper (1965), Zakhar Berkut (1971), The Arrows of Robin Hood (1975), Old Fortress (1976), D'Artagnan and Three Musketeers (1978), The Ballad of the Valiant Knight Ivanhoe (1983), The Black Arrow (1985) and Taras Bulba (2009). In these films, the fortress usually represented various French and English castles, including La Rochelle.

== Legends ==
There are also many legends about the fortress, created over the hundreds of years of its existence. Some popular legends involve the origins of the large dark spot on the side of the wall of the fortress. One legend says that the spot was created by the tears of the Khotyn rebels against the Ottoman Turks that were killed inside the fortress. Another legend has it that the spot was created from the tears of a girl named Oksana, whom the Turks buried alive in the walls of the fort.

== Khotyn in art ==
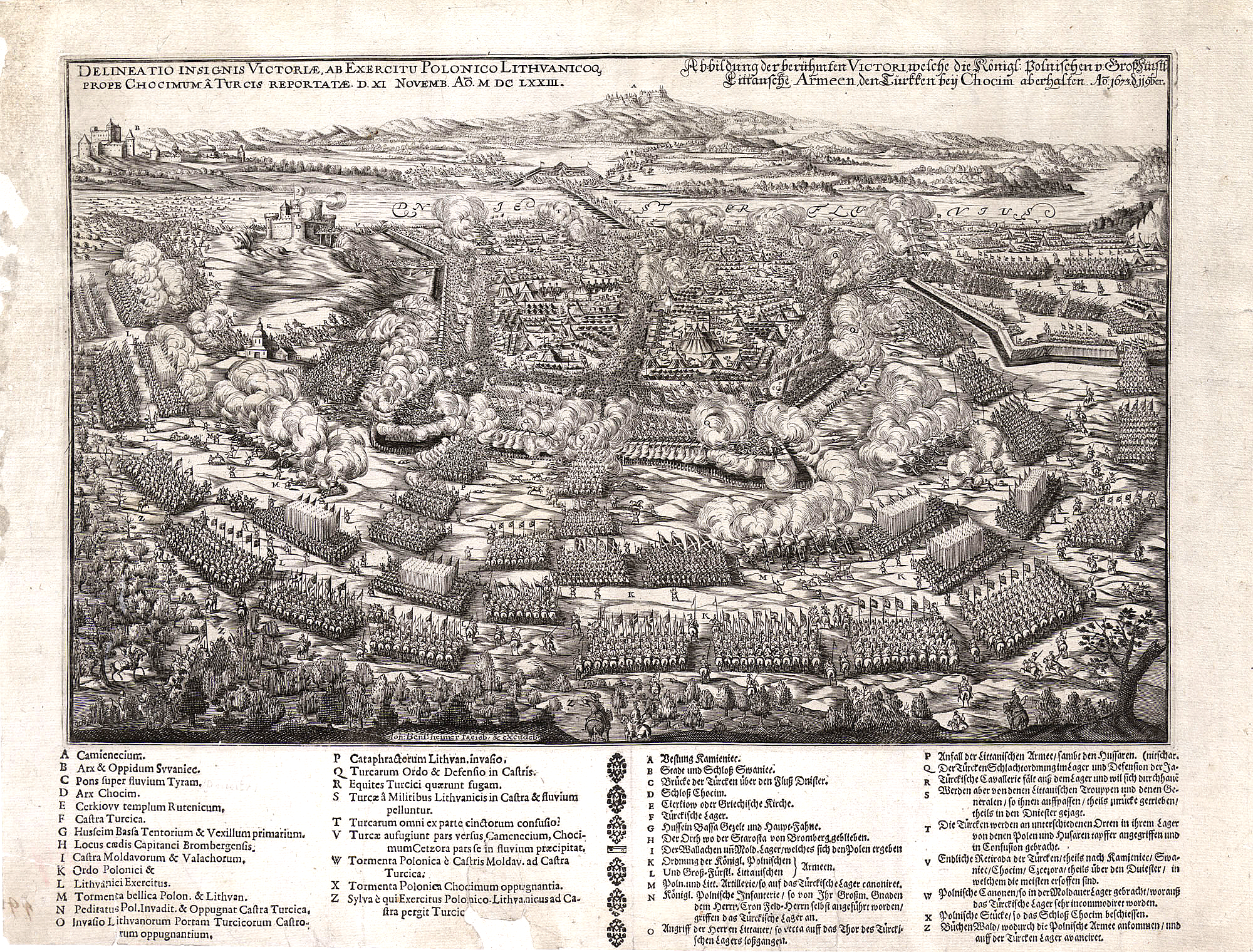
Battle of Khotyn, 1673

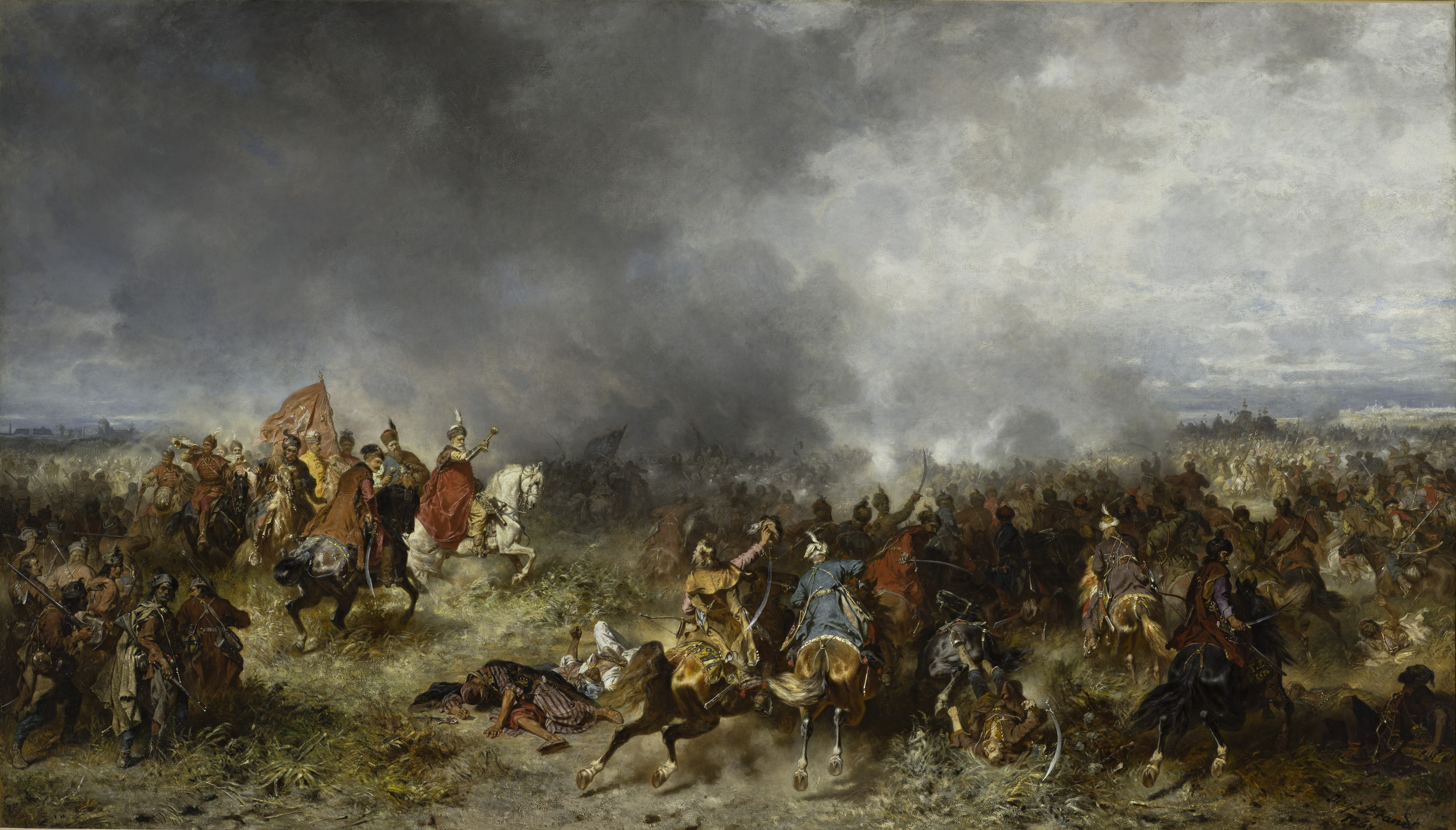
Battle of Khotyn, 1673

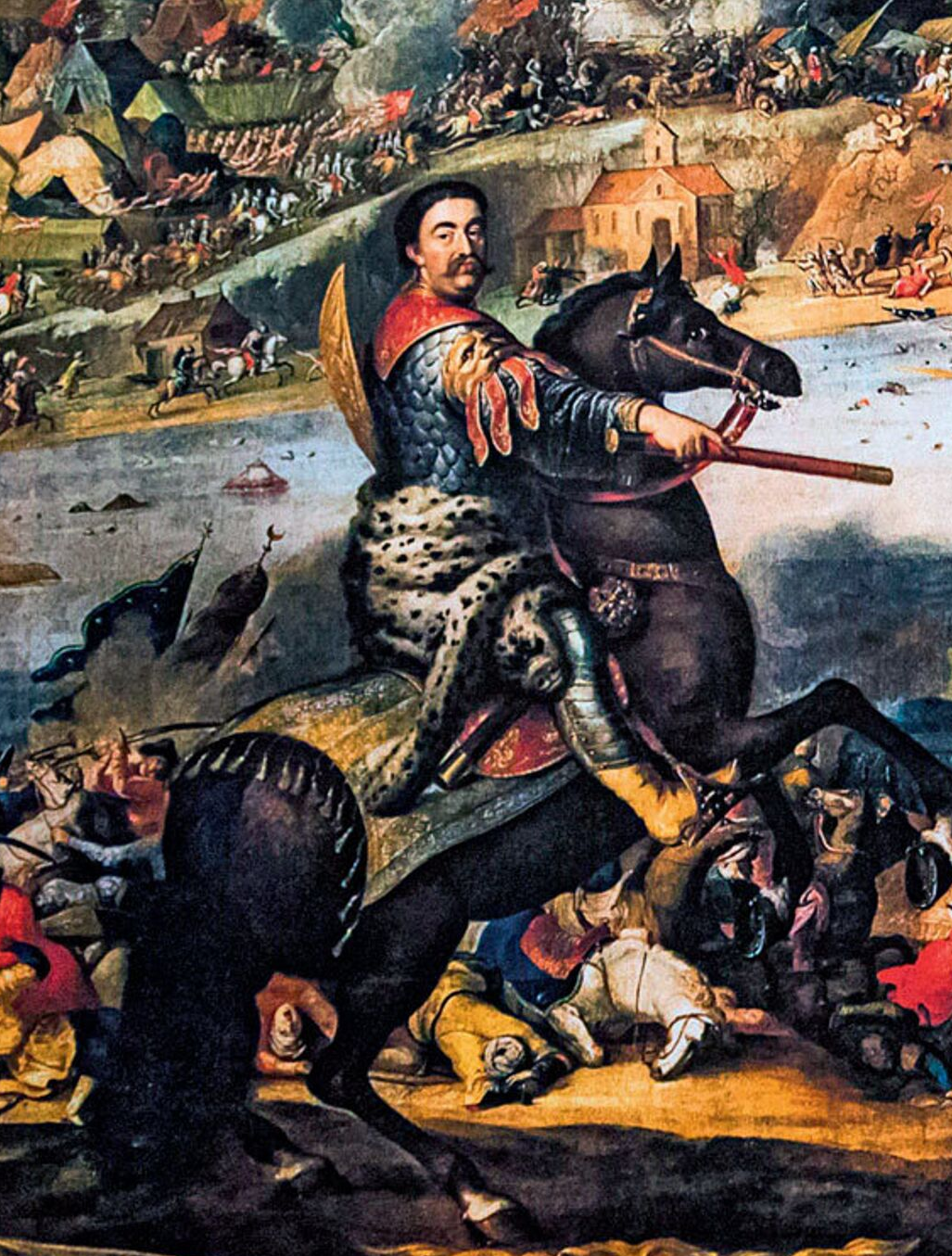
John III Sobieski in battle of Khotyn, 1673

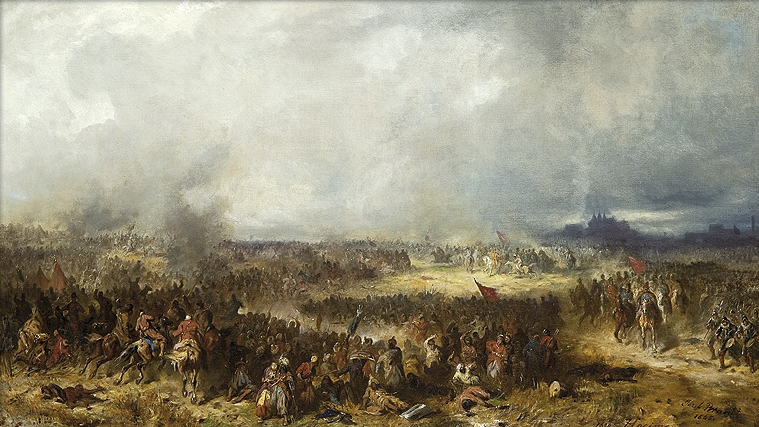
Battle of Chocim, 1621. Joseph Brandt.

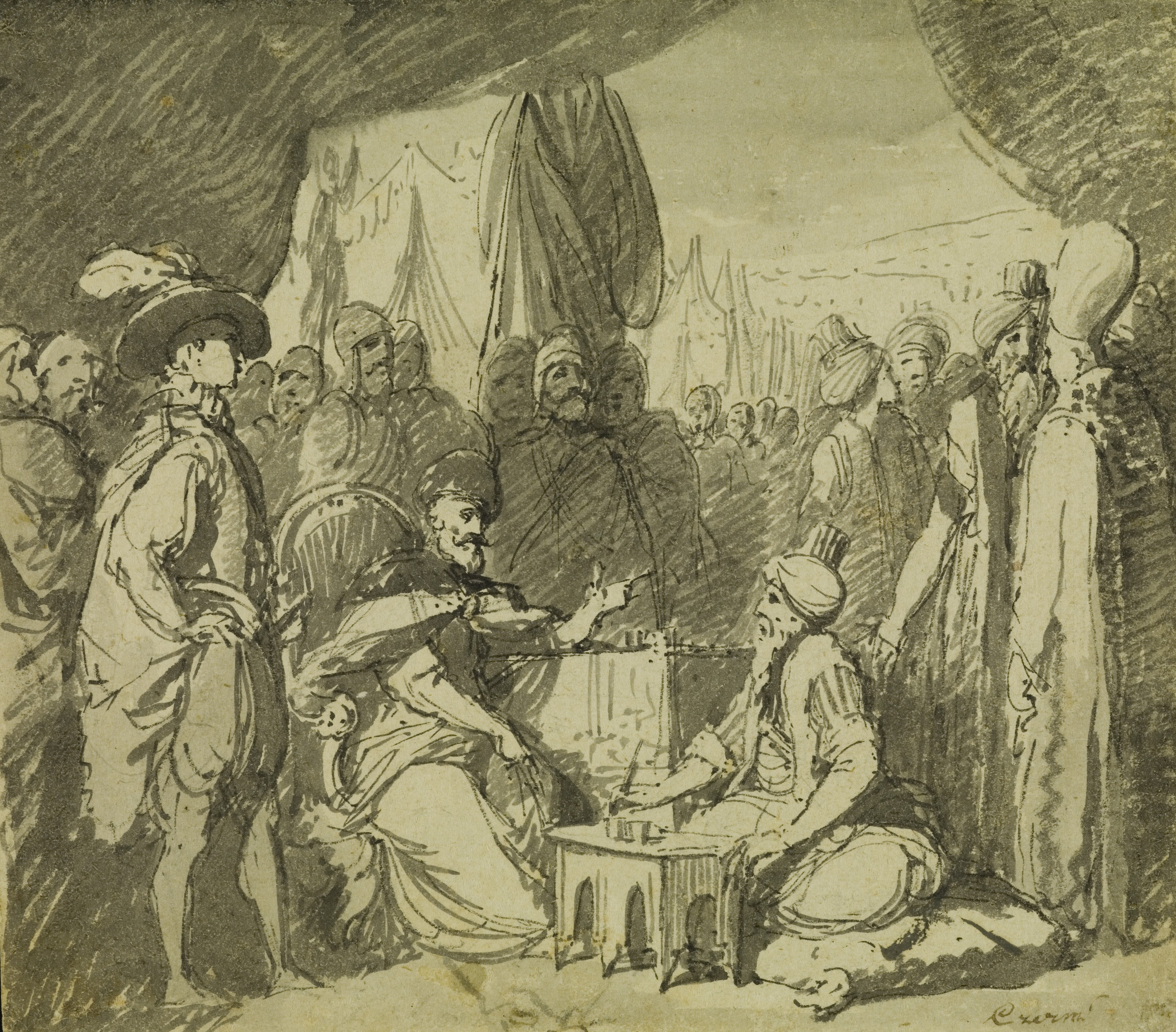
Chocim treaty, 1621. Franciszek Smuglewicz, 1785.

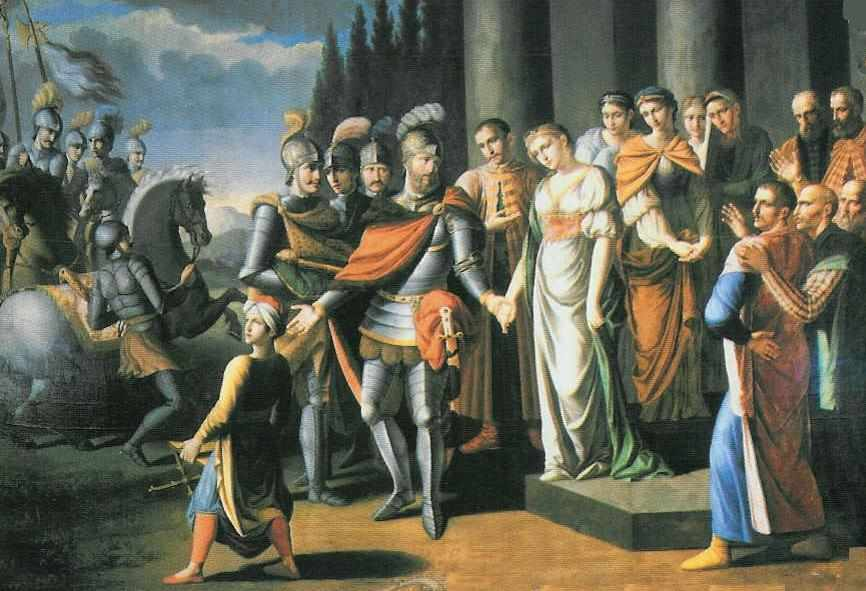
Farewell before the Khotyn battle, 1621

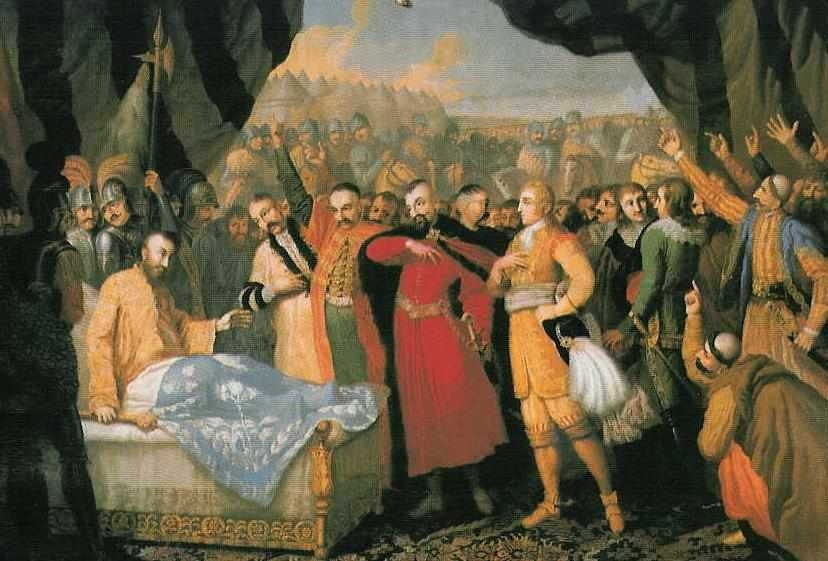
Chodkiewicz death

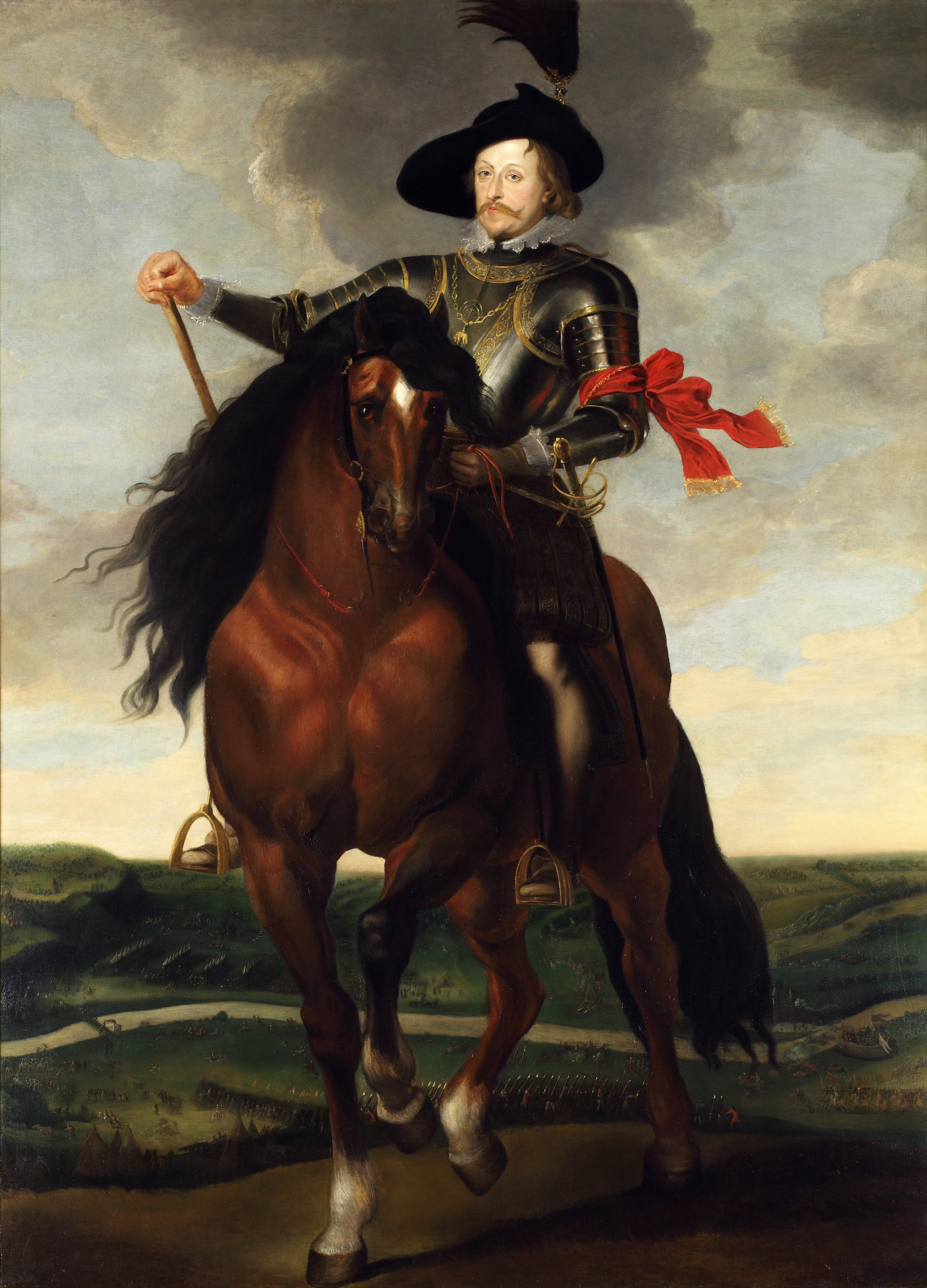
Prince Władysław Vasa (1624)

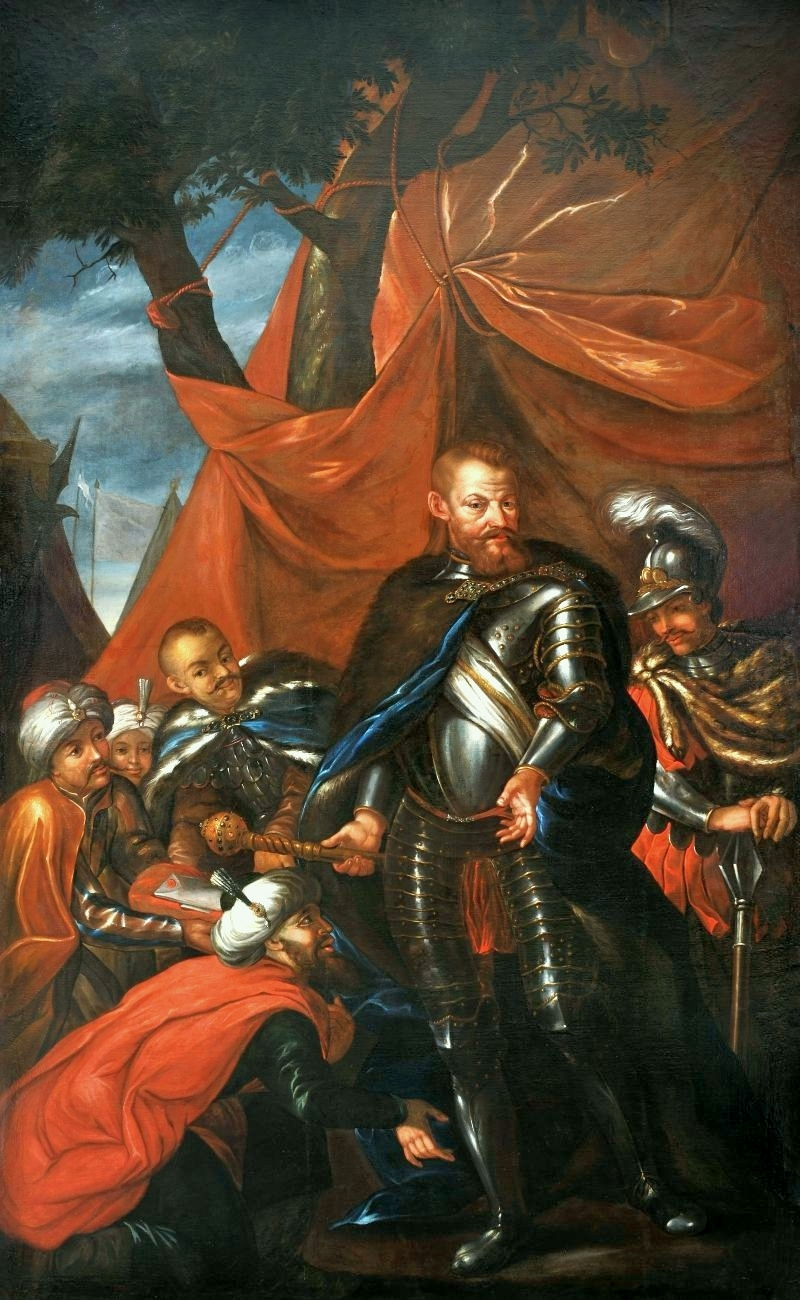
Stanisław Lubomirski in the camp (1647)

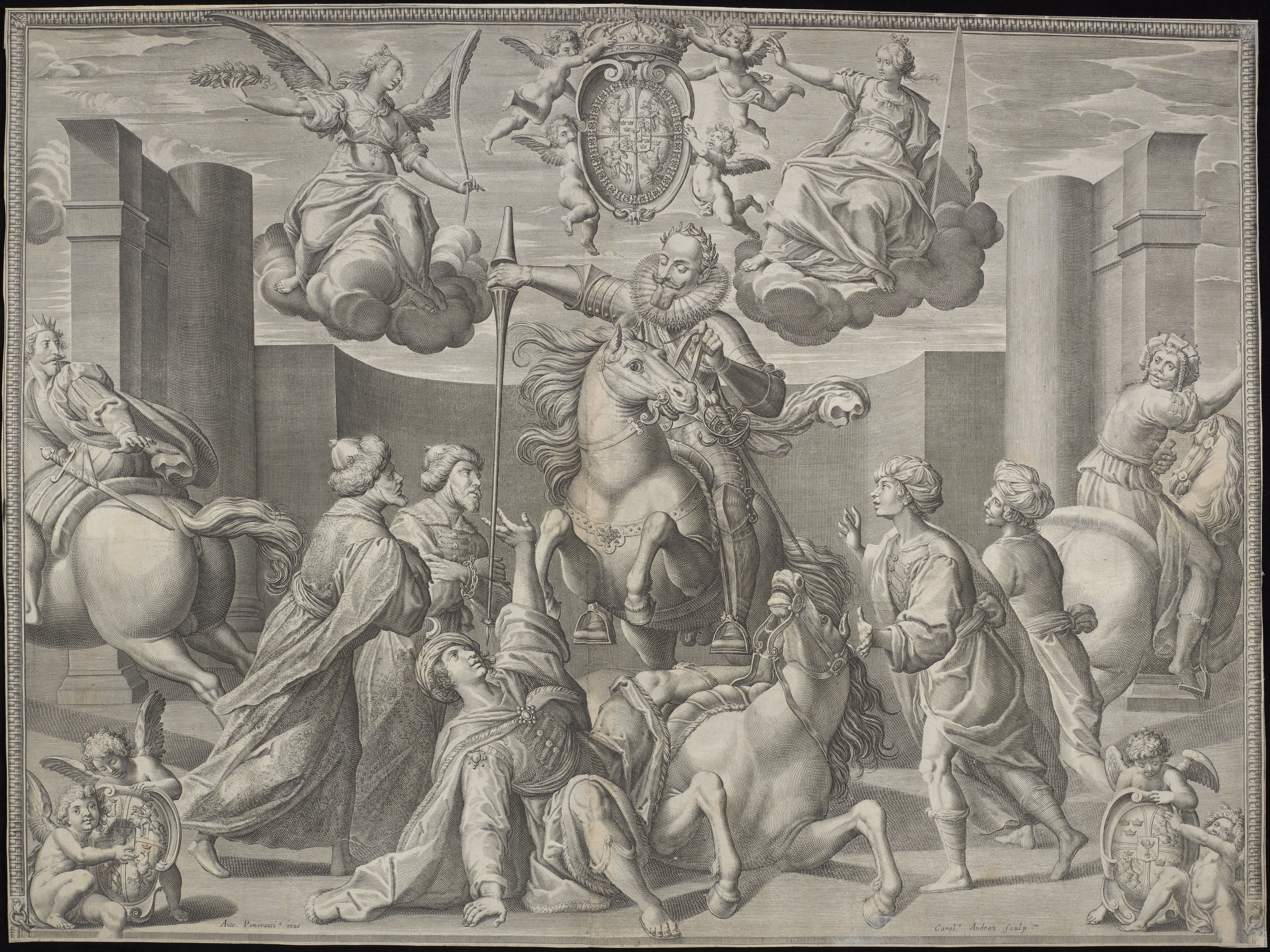
Apoteoza Zygmunta III after the Khotyn battle
