= Colceag (disambiguation) =

Colceag is a commune in Prahova County, Muntenia, Romania

Colceag may also refer to:

- Colceag (river)

== Surname ==
It may be a surname from Turkish kolçak.

- Iliaș Colceag, Moldavian mercenary and military commander in the Ottoman and Russian Empire
- Sorin Colceag, Romanian footballer and football manager

== See also ==
- Kolchak
- Kolçak
