= Second siege of Ochakov =

- Part of the Russo-Turkish War (1735–1739)
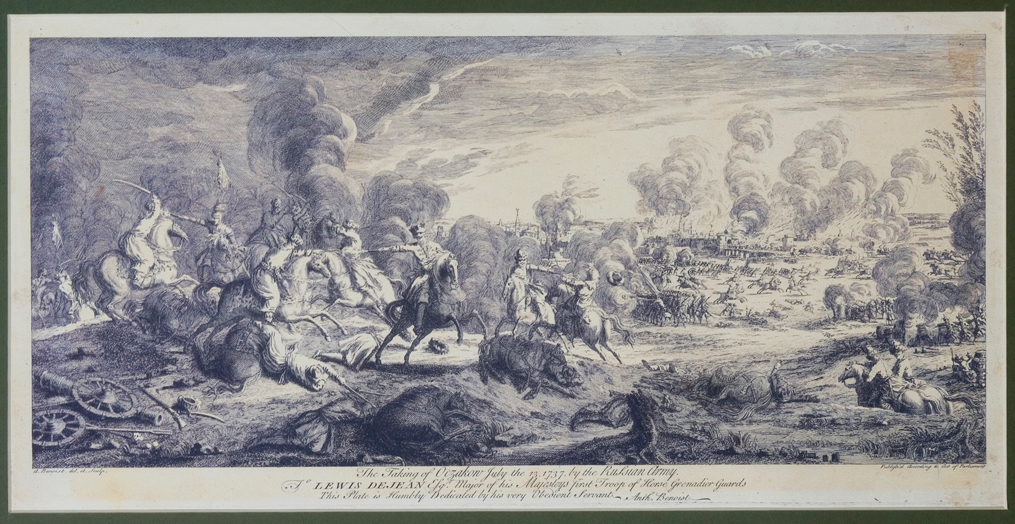
- Ochakov
Date	18 October – 10 November 1737
Location	Özi/Ochakov, Özü Eyalet (now Ochakiv, Ukraine)
Result	Russian victory

Belligerents
Ottoman Empire; Crimean Khanate	Russian Empire

Commanders and leaders
Mengli II Giray	Fedor Shtofeln

Strength
40,000 men	8,000 men

Casualties and losses
20,000 casualties; 10,000 killed; 10,000 died of disease	2,000 casualties; 321 killed; 710 wounded; 1,000 died of disease

The Second siege of Ochakov was a siege carried out by the Ottoman army to retake the Ochakov Castle, which had been lost in July 1737. Huge losses, torrential rains, and desertions on all sides forced the Ottomans to abandon the siege by 10 November.

== Siege ==
After the Russian troops of Field Marshal Burkhard Christoph von Münnich captured the Ochakov Fortress in the summer of 1737, the Ottomans attempted to recapture it and the Dnieper-Bug Estuary.

From early October, the Ottoman command harassed the Russian garrison of the fortress. On October 17, the first group of Ottoman ships entered the estuary and anchored briefly within cannon shot of Kinburn. On the night of October 20, a strong Ottoman cavalry detachment raided the fortress's redoubt, hoping to catch the garrison by surprise, but it was repulsed and forced to retreat.

On October 26, the vanguard of the Ottoman army approached the fortress, and on the 27th, the entire Ottoman army, numbering up to 20,000 Ottomans and 20,000 Tatars, set up camp within cannon range of the fortress.

On October 28, the first assault on the field fortifications near the Preobrazhensky Gate took place, but it was repelled by the Smolensk Regiment. On October 29, the Ottoman-Tatar army launched a general assault on the Izmailovsky Gate. By October 30, they had captured the retrenchment and redoubts, but failed to break into the fortress.

From October 31 to November 8, Ottoman troops bombarded the fortress and made isolated attempts to capture the fortifications. The most powerful assault took place on November 8 near the Izmailovsky and Khristoforovsky Gates. After losing 4,000 men, the Ottomans were forced to retreat.

Upon learning that Russian reinforcements were approaching along the Dnieper, the Ottomans ceased fire at 10:00 PM and began retreating toward Bendery on the night of November 10, without having time to carry away all their artillery.

== Aftermath ==
Under the terms of the Treaty of Belgrade in 1739, Ochakov was returned to the Ottoman Empire. After the war, Ochakov became the main base of the Ottoman fleet on the northern shores of the Black Sea.
