= Kolchak =

Kolchak, Kolçak or Kolčák is a surname from Turkish kolçak. Notable people with the surname include:

- Alexander Kolchak (1874–1920), Russian naval commander, head of anti-Bolshevik White forces
- Erkan Kolçak Köstendil, Turkish actor, director and former footballer
- Eşref Kolçak (1927–2019), Turkish actor
- Iliash Kolchak ("Kolchak-Pasha") (fl. before 1710–1743), Moldavian mercenary and military commander
- Kristián Kolčák (born 1990), Slovak football midfielder
- Sibel Kolçak, Turkish football referee

== Fictional characters ==
- Carl Kolchak, protagonist of Kolchak: The Night Stalker, an American television series

== See also ==
- Colceag
