= Siege of Perekop (1736) =

Siege of the Austro-Russian–Turkish war (1735–39)

- Part of the Russo-Turkish War of 1735–1739
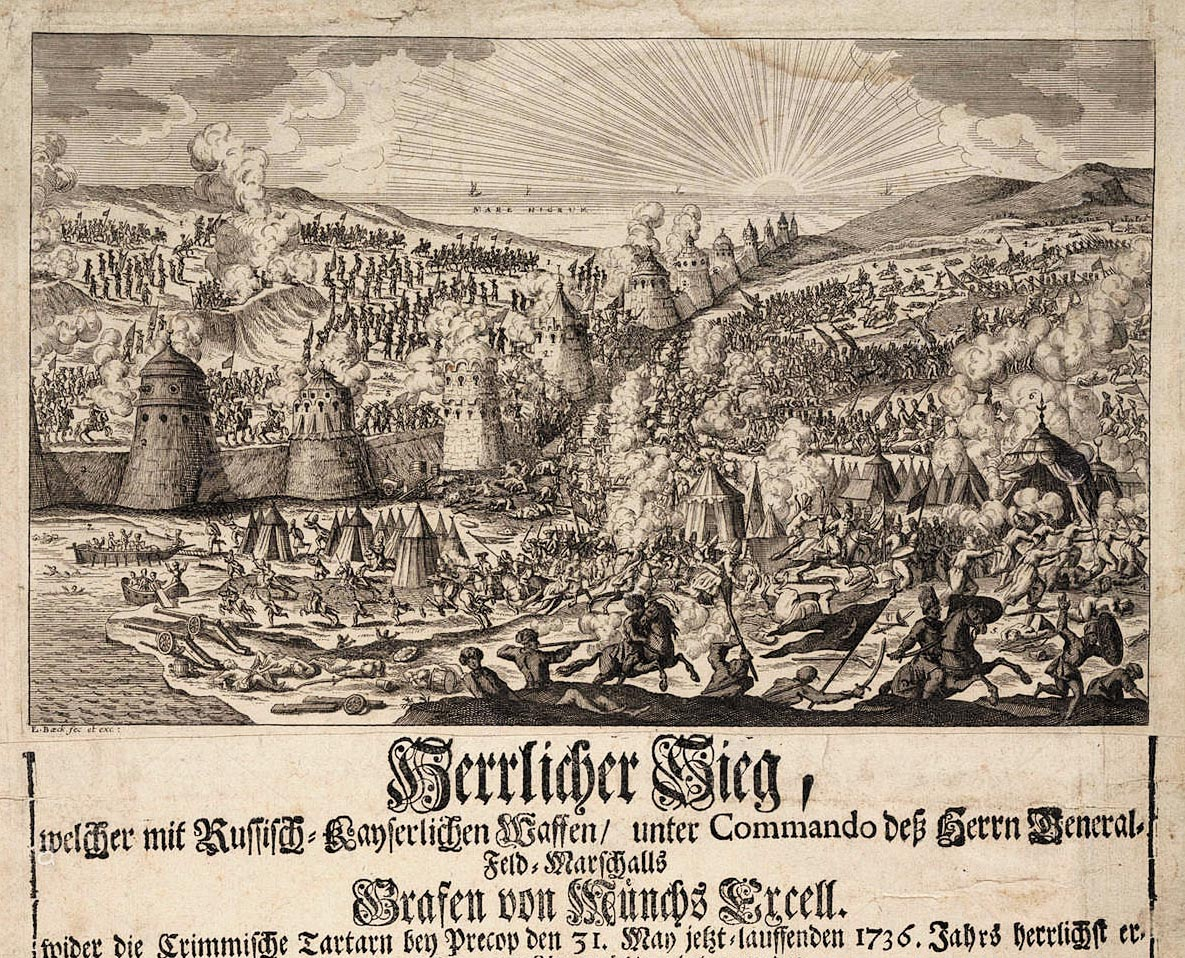
Date	19 May – 12 November 1736
Location	Perekop, Crimea
Result	Russian victory

Belligerents
Ottoman Empire; Crimean Khanate	Russia

Commanders and leaders
Fetih II Giray; Ibrahim Pasha	(Russian Empire) Burkhard Christoph von Münnich (Russian Empire) Vasily Dolgorukov

Strength
Garrison: (Ottoman Empire) 3–4,000 soldiers and 84 cannons Field: 20,000 cavalry	50–58,000 soldiers

Casualties and losses
(Ottoman Empire) up to 1,400 killed, wounded, or missing; up to 2,600 captured; 60 cannon captured	From 202 in all to 500 dead and 200 wounded

The siege of Perekop (Russian: Штурм Перекопа; storming of Perekop) on June 1 (OS: 21 May), 1736, was part of the Russo-Turkish War (1735–1739). Russian field marshal Burkhard Christoph von Münnich (known in Russia as Minikh) successfully stormed the Turkish fortifications at the Isthmus of Perekop and left the Tatar fortress Fortress Or Qapi (known as Perekop Fortress in Russian) in ruins. As a result, the Russian Empire for the first time gained access into the Crimean Peninsula. This was a serious blow to the independence of the Crimean Khanate.

Approaching Perekop on 30 May (OS 19 May), the vanguard repelled an attack by Crimean cavalry in the Chorna Dolyna (tract), 40 kilometres (25 mi) north of Perekop. Approaching the fortifications, Minikh immediately began an assault. Minikh feigned a false attack on the right flank, and the major attack on the fight flank broke through the fortifications. The stormtroopers crossed the ditch, and then, using pikes and chevaux de frise, climbed the rampart. Half an hour later, they were at the top. Only a detachment on one of the watchtowers put up fierce resistance, defending itself for an hour. It was completely exterminated. The rest surrendered on the condition of going home. Corporal V. M. Dolgorukov distinguished himself during the storming. For this assault he was promoted to sergeant major.

The army proceeded to the capital of the Khanate, Bakhchisaray, and Akmescit (now Simferopol). However epidemic, epizooty, and mutiny in the army forced Minikh to leave Crimea.
