= Iliaș Colceag =

Moldavian mercenary and military commander

Iliaș Colceag (fl. before 1710 – 1743) was a Moldavian mercenary and military commander in the Ottoman and Russian Empire.

== Biography ==
According to some sources, Colceag was born in southern Bessarabia (Budjak), at a time when Moldavia was a vassal state to the Ottoman Empire. He entered the Ottoman army and was first posted in Bosnia. Here, he converted to Islam and took the name of Hussein. He distinguished himself during the Russo-Turkish War of 1710–1711, being promoted bölükbaşı. In 1717 Sultan Ahmed III awarded him the title of pasha and named him commander of Khotyn Fortress. Colceag kept this position for 22 years. In Turkish historiography he is also known as Kolchak-Pasha. In 1734 (according to other sources 1736) he was appointed vizier, but held this position only for a short time.

During the Russo-Turkish War of 1735–1739, Colceag was appointed commander in chief of the Ottoman armed forces of the Moldavian front. He did not see any major action, as the main battles were fought primarily on the Crimean Peninsula. However, in 1738, when the main hostilities moved to the Southern Bug, the command of the Ottoman army was taken over by Veli-Paşa while Colceag kept his position of commander of the Khotyn Fortress.

After defeating the Turks in the Battle of Stavuchany, Russian General Burkhard Christoph von Münnich besieged the Khotyn Fortress. Colceag had only 900 men to face the over 60,000 strong Russian army. General von Münnich offered Colceag honorable conditions of surrender following which, on 19 August 1739 the pasha capitulated.

Colceag and his son Mahmet-bey were taken to Saint Petersburg and stayed there as prisoners of war. They were freed by Empress Anna of Russia on 15 February 1740. After the peace treaty was signed, Colceag decided to return to Istanbul. On his way he was informed that Sultan Mahmud I had decided to decapitate him, considering the surrender of Khotyn an act of treason.

Colceag entered into service with the Kiev voivode, the Polish count Józef Potocki. He settled in Żytomierz, where he died in 1743.

His son entered into Russian service and converted to Orthodox Christianity. Under Empress Elizabeth of Russia the Kolchak family achieved aristocratic status and became landowners. Most of Colceag’s descendants followed military careers. The most famous of Colceag’s descendants is Admiral Alexander Kolchak.
