= Sibel Kolçak =

Turkish football referee and teacher

- Born: January 3, 1990 (age 36); Zonguldak, Turkey
- Other occupation: Teacher

Domestic
Years	League	Role
2011-	Women*'s Regional	referee
2013-	A2	referee
2013-	Women's Second	
2013-	Women's First	referee
2014-	Regional Amateur	referee

Sibel Kolçak (born January 3, 1990) is a Turkish female FIFA-listed football referee. She is a teacher from profession and lives in Zonguldak, Turkey.

== Early years ==
Sibel Kolçak was born in Zonguldak, Turkey on January 3, 1990. She studied Sports Administration at Sakarya University, and returned after graduation to her hometown Zonguldak.

== Referee career ==
=== Domestic ===
She began her referee career in 2007 in her hometown, and officially debuted as an assistant referee debuting on March 1, 2008. She officiated her first match in the capacity of a referee on November 7, 2009, at a match of the Coca-Cola Academy U-14 League. Kolçak's first referee role in a Women*s Regional League match took place on January 8, 2011. In 2013, she was appointed referee in the men*s A2 League and Women's Second League, and finally on December 22, 2013, she was promoted to officiate a Women's First League match.

As of end 205, Kolçak was in charge of various referee roles in 76 games at different domestic leagues.

=== International ===
In November 2015, Kolçak was nominated by the Turkish Football Federation a FIFA listed official for international matches in 2016.
