= Or Qapi =

Ruined fort near Perekop in Ukraine

Coordinates: 46°08′52″N 33°41′28″E

Or Qapi Fortress
- Crimea, Ukraine (de jure)
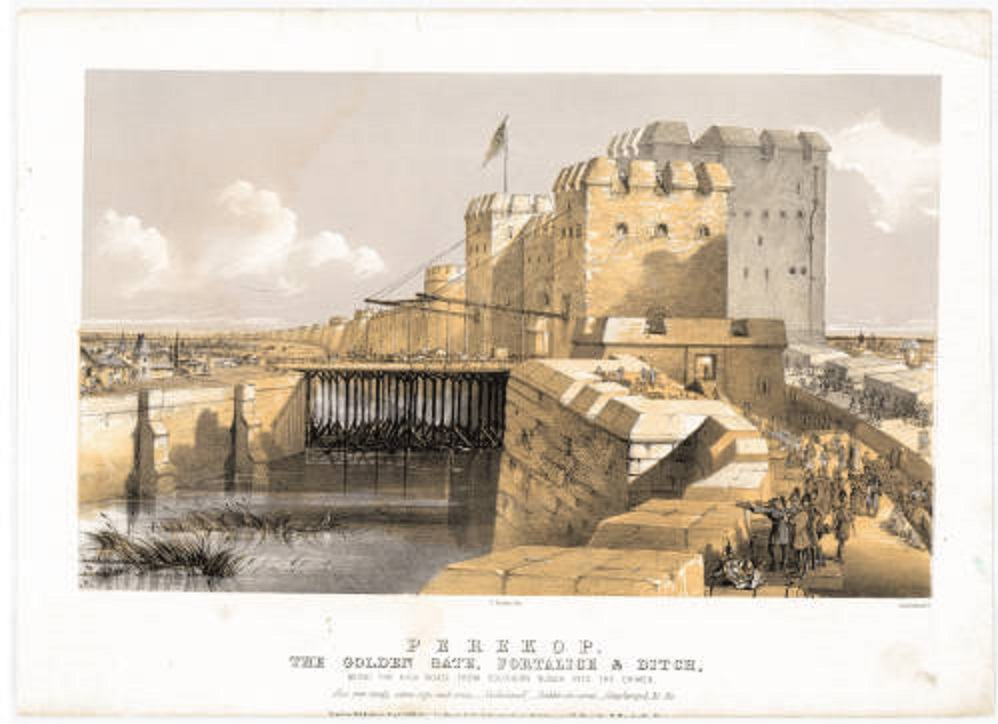

Site information
- Type: Fortress
- Condition: In ruins

Site history
- Events: Siege of Perekop

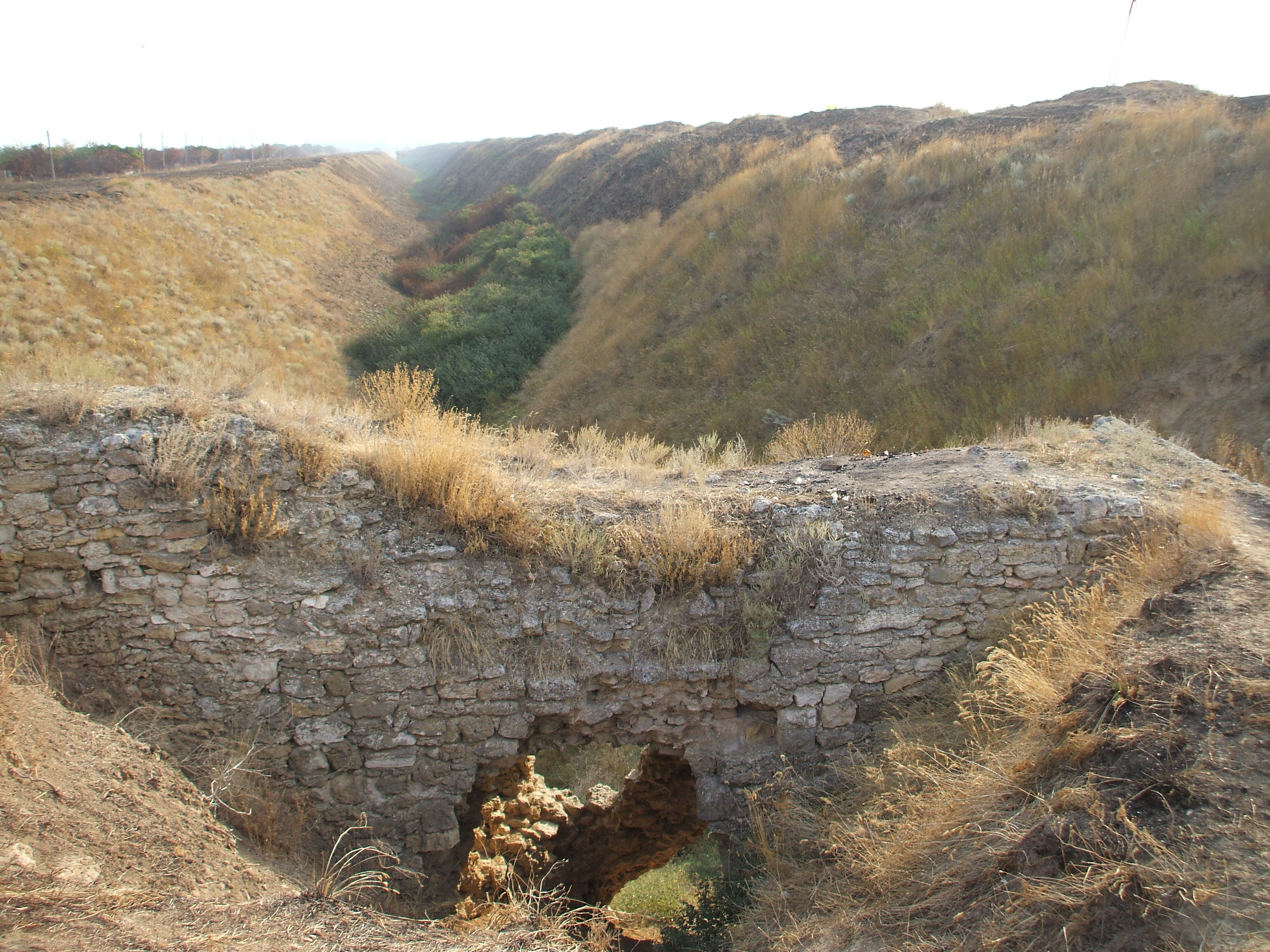
Ruins of Or Qapi Fortress.

Or Qapi Fortress is a ruined fort located near the settlement of Perekop on the Perekop isthmus connecting the Crimean peninsula to the Ukrainian mainland.

== History ==
The Or Qapi fort was built in the 15th century by Mengli Girai and his son Sahib I Giray. Or Qapi Fortress used to be of great military importance as the key to the Crimean Khanate.

During the Russo-Turkish War (1735–1739), the Russian field marshal Burkhard Christoph von Munnich successfully stormed the fortifications on June 17, 1736, and left the Tatar fortress in ruins. In 1738, it was taken again by Russian General Lacy. This was a serious, if not mortal, blow to the independence of the Crimean Khanate. In 1754, it was rebuilt by Qirim Giray. In 1771, the fortress was captured decisively by Russian General Dolgorukov.

During the Second World War, it repeatedly changed ownership between Germany and USSR.
