= Battle of Stavuchany =

1739 battle of the Russo-Turkish war

- Part of Austro-Russian–Turkish War (1735–39)
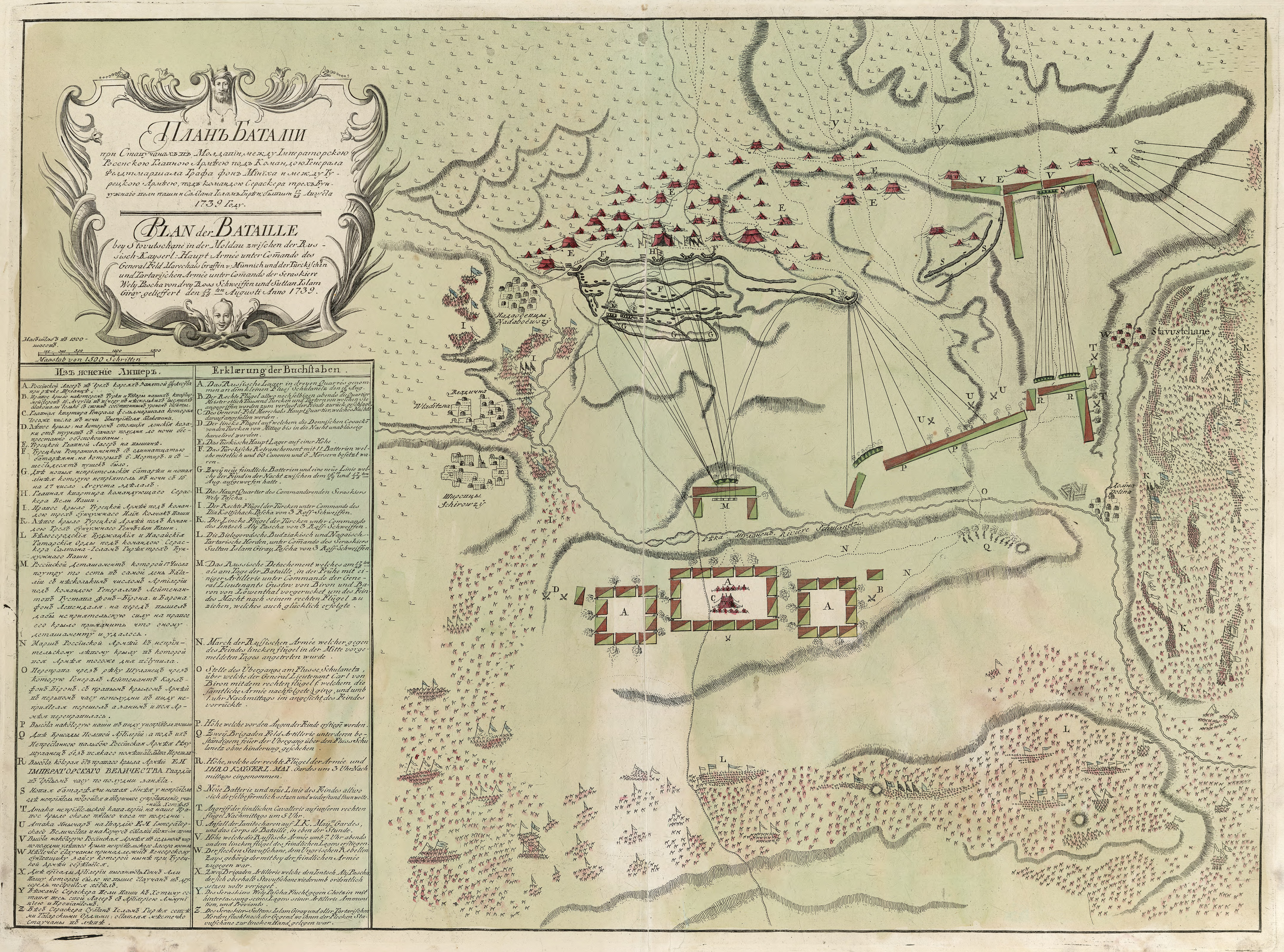
- Map of Battle of Savuchny (in Russian and German)
| Date | August 28 (17 in Julian calendar), 1739 |
| Location | near Khotyn, now in Chernivtsi Oblast, Ukraine |
| Result | Russian victory |
| Territorial changes | The Russians occupy most of Moldavia; Treaty of Niš |

Belligerents
| Russian Empire: Zaporozhian Host | Ottoman Empire: Crimean Khanate |

Commanders and leaders
| Burkhard Christoph von Münnich; Gustav von Biron; Karl von Biron | Veli Pasha; Iliaș Colceag; Genj Ali Pasha; İslâm Geray |

Strength
| 61,000 (48,000 regular troops); 48,000 engaged (40,000 regulars & 8,000 irregulars); 250 guns | 70,000–90,000: 30,000–40,000 Turks: • 15–20,000 janissaries; • 8–20,000 sipahis and mounted janissaries; • 7,000 lipcanis; 40,000–50,000 Crimean Tatars; 70 guns |

Casualties and losses
| Official data: 13 killed, 54 wounded Some estimates: Total losses 1,800–2,000 | Russian estimate: More than 1,000 killed Some estimates: 2,000–15,000 killed and wounded |

The Battle of Stavuchany was fought between the Russian and Ottoman armies, which took place on August 28 (17) of 1739 during the Russo-Turkish War of 1735–1739. The Russians emerged victorious.

== Prelude ==
Stavuchany (Romanian Stăuceni) is a small Moldavian village some 12 km (7.5 mi) southwest of Khotyn (today's Chernivtsi Oblast in Ukraine, Ukrainian: Ставчани, Russian: Ставучаны). The Russian army (approx. 61,000 men and 250 cannons) under the command of Field Marshal Burkhard Christoph von Münnich approached Stavuchany, where the Ottoman army (80,000 to 90,000 men) under the leadership of Serasker Veli Pasha was concentrated. The army consisted of 30–40,000 Turks (including the garrison of the Khotyn fortress) and Crimean Tatars (up to 50,000, according to Russian estimates), with 70 guns. The main Turks' force blocked the way to Khotyn, while some 10,000 Turks and the Tatars surrounded the Russian army from the flanks and rear respectively and threatened its wagon train. By the evening of August 27 (16), Münnich's army was surrounded in the lowlands, but repulsed all the attacks of the Turkish cavalry under Iliaș Colceag and Genj Ali Pasha and 50,000-strong Tatar cavalry under İslâm Geray. The main forces of the Turks with artillery occupied the commanding heights beyond the Shulanets River, on the road to Khotyn, and fortified there.

== Battle ==
On the morning of August 28 (17), Munnich moved a strong detachment under the command of Gustav Biron (brother of Ernst Johann von Biron, a lover of Empress Anna of Russia) across the river. This detachment stood for several hours under Turkish artillery fire, and then retreated back across the river. The Turks decided that the offensive of the Russian army was repulsed, and Veli Pasha even sent a corresponding report to Khotyn. However, at this time, the Russians built a large number of bridges across the Shulanets River on their right flank (where Karl Biron, another brother of Empress's lover, commanded) and with their entire army rushed there, bypassing the fortified positions of the Turks from the east. The Turks launched several attacks trying to stop this advance, but were completely defeated and fled, leaving their fortified camp, which was captured by the Russian army. The Russian army captured some 50 cannons and other trophies.

== Aftermath ==
According to Russian data, the Ottoman army left more than 1,000 people killed on the battlefield (the number of wounded is unknown). In the official report of Münnich, the losses of the Russian army were indicated in only 13 killed and 54 wounded. However, these data are completely unreliable. So, for the Semenovsky Regiment, losses are indicated as 1 wounded person. Actually in the fighting on August 27–28 (16–17), the regiment lost 43 men killed and 102 wounded. Other estimates of Russian casualties indicate a total of 1,800–2,000 killed and wounded and Ottoman losses are also estimated at between 2,000 and 15,000 killed or wounded.

As a result of the Battle of Stavuchany, the Ottoman fortress of Khotyn was captured by Russians on August 30 (19), Soon after that, Münnich entered Iași on September 14 (3), and occupied most of the Principality of Moldavia. Despite those victories, the Russian court decided to accept French mediation, that resulted in the Treaty of Niš (October 3) by which Russia had to return almost all captured territories, including those gained in Moldavia.

== Sources ==
- Aksan, Virginia H. (2007). Ottoman Wars, 1700-1870: An Empire Besieged. London & New York: Routledge.
- Davies, Brian (2011). Empire and Military Revolution in Eastern Europe: Russia's Turkish Wars in the Eighteenth Century. London & New York: Bloomsbury Publishing.

Template:Portal (view source) (protected)
