= Siege of Küstrin =

1758 siege in the Seven Years' War

Coordinates: 52°35′14″N 14°38′59″E

- Part of the Seven Years' War
| Date | 15–24 August 1758 |
| Location | Küstrin, Brandenburg |
| Result | Prussian victory |

Belligerents
| (Kingdom of Prussia) Prussia | (Russian Empire) Russia |

Commanders and leaders
| Schack von Wittenau | William Fermor |

Strength
| 75 guns | Unknown |

Casualties and losses
| 318 houses destroyed | 11 killed, 36 wounded |

The siege of Küstrin (Cüstrin) in 1758 was a siege of the Seven Years' War (1756-1763). It was conducted by the Russians against the fortified town of Küstrin in Prussia (now in Poland).

== Aftermath ==
The Russian besiegers probably did not intend for the town to experience such destruction. Nevertheless, when the Prussian army saw how the Russian bombardment devastated the city it became a major cause for Prussian animosity towards the Russian army. However, this devastation was not necessarily unique to Küstrin. The sieges against Zittau (1757) and Dresden (1760) also were particularly destructive in an era generally characterized by restraint.
