= Siege of Ochakov (1737) =

Siege of the Austro-Russian–Turkish War (1735–1739)

- Part of the Russo-Turkish War (1735–1739)
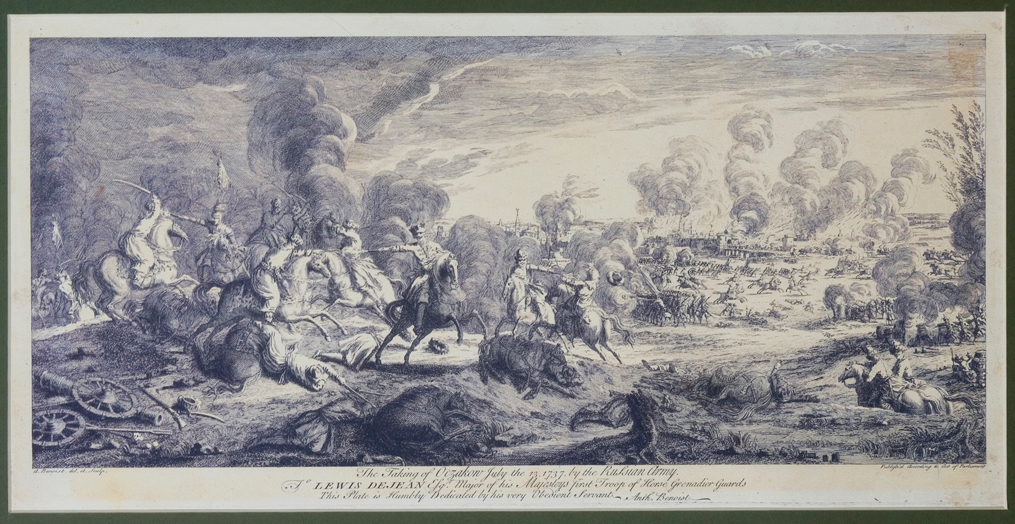
Date	10 July (29 June O.S.) – 13 July (2 July O.S.), 1737
Location	Özi/Ochakov, Özü Eyalet (now Ochakiv, Ukraine)
Result	Russian victory

Belligerents
Ottoman Empire	Russian Empire; Zaporizhian Cossacks

Commanders and leaders
Hatibzade Yahya Pasha (POW); Mustafa Pasha (POW)	Burkhard Christoph von Münnich; Alexander Rumyantsev; Ludwig Gruno; Mikhail Leontiev

Strength
20,000	60,000

Casualties and losses
17,000 (Note: As a result of Russian mortar fire on the houses within the fortress, fire broke out, and on the second day of the siege, the powder magazine within the city blew up, killing an estimated 6,000 defenders. Thereafter the fortress capitulated, and in the ensuing slaughter, in spite of the white flag, all but 3,000 of the garrison were killed.)	4,000

The siege of Ochakov (1737) took place during the Austro-Russian–Turkish War (1735–39) in which the Russian army, led by Burkhard Christoph von Münnich, captured the Ottoman fortress of Ochakov. It took place in 1737.

== Siege ==
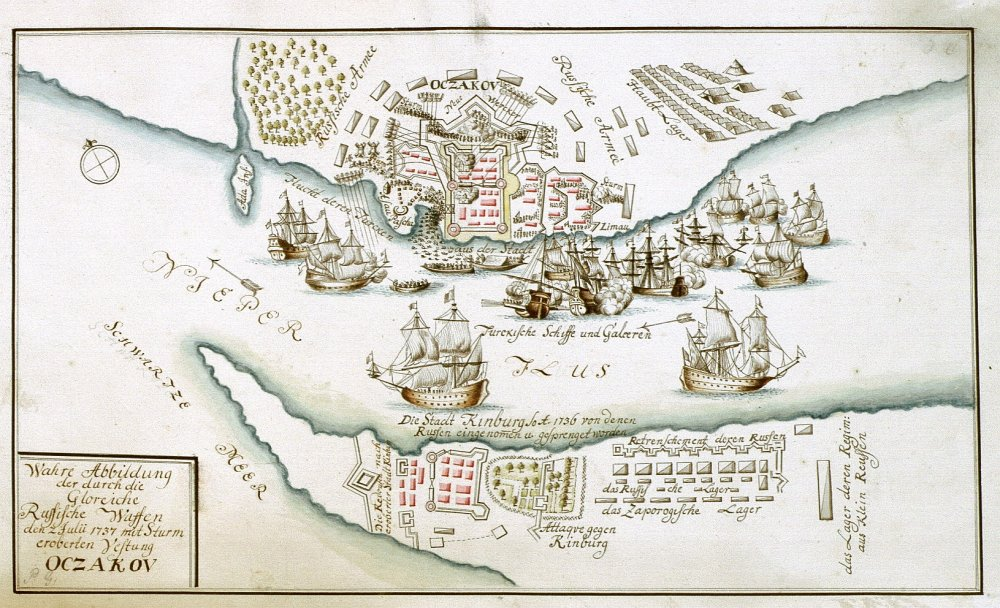
Siege of Ochakov

Münnich's army (60–70,000 men) consisted of three divisions: the first under Prince Ludwig of Hesse-Homburg, the second under General Alexander Rumyantsev, and the third under Lieutenant General Mikhail Leontiev. The Turkish garrison included 22,000 infantry and cavalry under the command of Serasker Yahya Pasha and the commandant was the two-tug pasha Mustafa. The artillery consisted of 98 cannons, 7 mortars and 1 howitzer.

The first Russian attack was repelled with heavy losses, but as a result of heavy mortar fire, a fire broke out, and on the second day a powder magazine within the city blew up, killing around 6,000 defenders. The fortress quickly surrendered, but the remaining defenders were massacred by the attackers despite attempting to surrender. In the ensuing slaughter, all but 3,000 of the garrison were killed. The stench of decaying corpses was such that the Russians had to withdraw 15 miles from the fortress.

== Aftermath ==
The Russians razed and abandoned Özi in late 1738 after a disease ravaged the Russian garrison of the fortress, killing 60,000 people. It would not be attacked again until July 1771 in a failed siege. The Russians only managed to regain Özi in December 1788.

== Sources ==
- Aksan, Virginia H. (2013). Ottoman wars 1700-1870. Routledge.
- Europe and the world, 1650–1830, Jeremy Black
- Stone, David R. (2006). A Military History of Russia: From Ivan the Terrible to the War in Chechnya. Greenwood Publishing Group.
