= Burkhard Christoph von Münnich =

Russian field marshal (1683–1767)

Graf Burkhard Christoph von Münnich
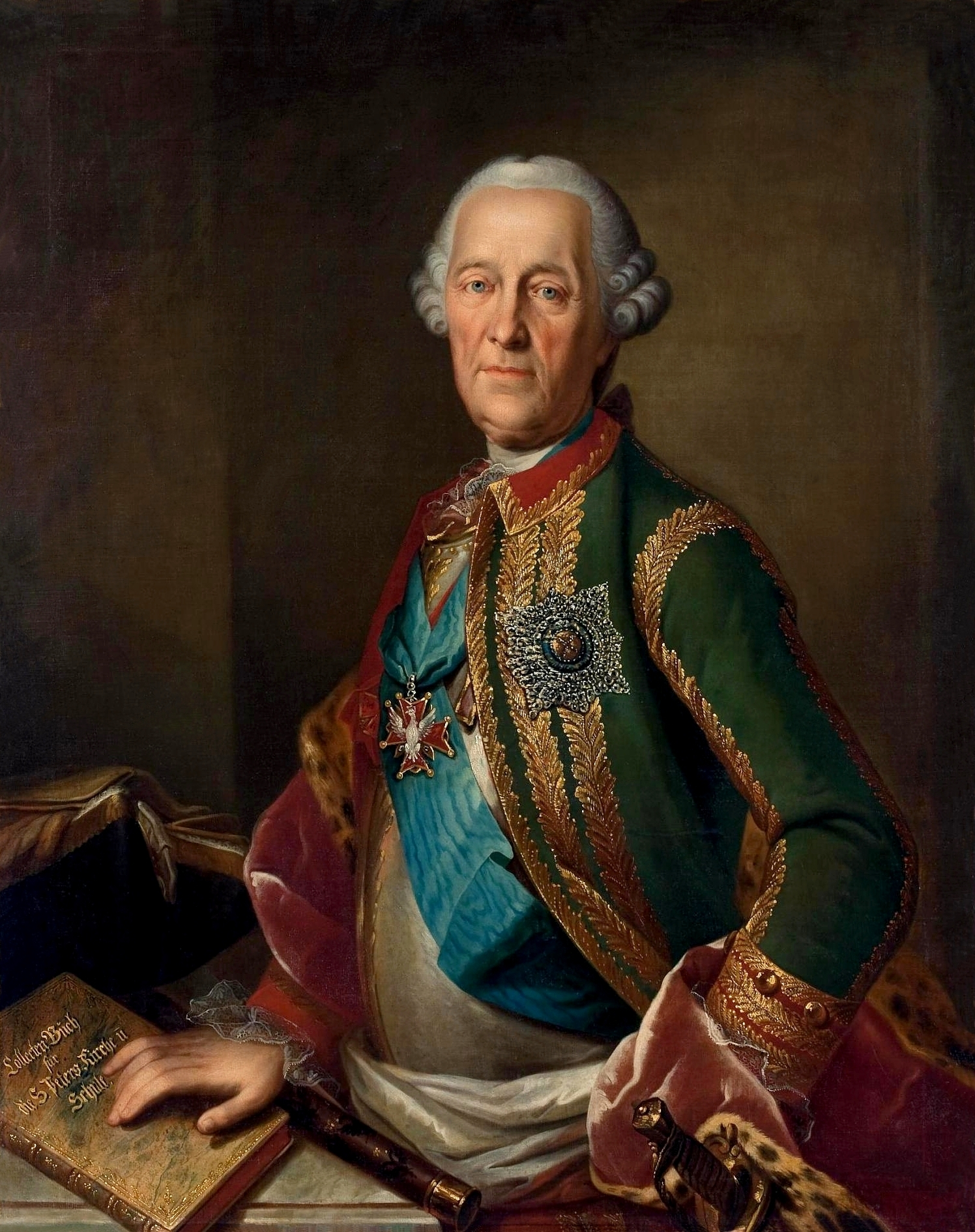
- Portrait by Heinrich Buchholz, 18th century
- Born: 19 May [O.S. 9] 1683; Neuenhuntorf, County of Oldenburg, Holy Roman Empire
- Died: 27 October [O.S. 16] 1767 (aged 84); Dorpat, Russian Empire
- Burial place: Private estate
- Other name: Christofor Antonovich von Münnich
- Military career
- Allegiance: France; Holy Roman Empire; Russia
- Branch: French Army; Army of Hesse; Army of Saxony; Russian Imperial Army
- Service years: 1700–1762
- Rank: Field marshal
- Commands: Imperial Russian Army
- Conflicts: War of the Spanish Succession; War of the Polish Succession; Siege of Danzig; Russo-Ottoman War; Siege of Azov; Storming of Perekop; Siege of Ochakov; Battle of Stavuchany; Capture of Khotin (Note: The capitulation of the Ottoman fortress of Hotin (Khotin) on 30 August, which surrendered without a fight: almost the entire garrison of the fortress took part in the Battle of Stavuchany.)

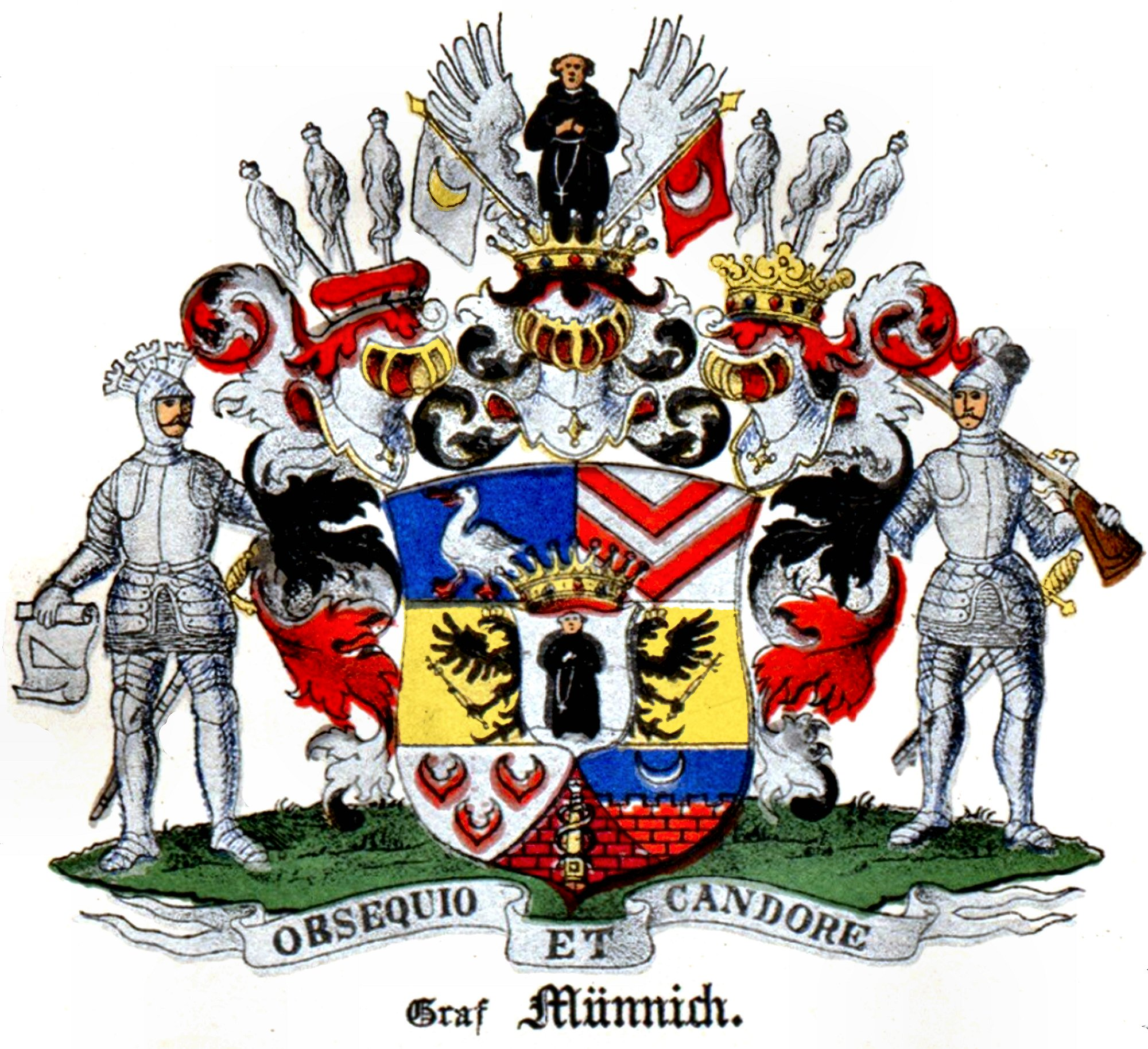
Coat of arms of the counts of the Münnich family of 1728, in the Baltic Coat of arms book by Carl Arvid von Klingspor in 1882.

Burkhard Christoph Graf von Münnich (Russian: Христофо́р Анто́нович Миних, romanized: Khristofor Antonovich Minikh; 19 May [O.S. 9 May] 1683 – 27 October [O.S. 16 October] 1767) was a German-born army officer who became a field marshal and political figure in the Russian Empire.

He carried out major reforms in the Russian Army and founded several elite military formations during the reign of Empress Anna of Russia (r. 1730–1740). As a statesman, he is widely regarded as the founder of Russian philhellenism. Like his father, Münnich was an engineer and a specialist in hydrotechnology.

== Early career ==
Münnich was born at Neuenhuntorf in the County of Oldenburg in the military family of Anton Günther Mönnich (since 1688 von Münnich, an east-Frisian nobility). Besides the knowledge of the native Low German language he also learned the Latin and French languages. He entered the French service at 17. Thence he transferred successively to the armies of Hesse-Darmstadt and of Saxony where he earned the rank of colonel and later major general.

In 1721, he was invited by the Russian ambassador in Warsaw, Alexey Grigoryevich Dolgorukov, for engineering projects of the newly acquired northern territories. Around that time his father has died. Upon arrival to Russia he presented Peter I plans for the fortification of Kronstadt fortress, which pleasantly surprised the Russian emperor, and the Annenkrone fortification in Vyborg. He was promoted to Lieutenant General in 1722. Among his first undertakings was the completion of the costly Ladoga Canal, which had been under construction for more than a decade. For his engineering and military-engineering achievements he was promoted to the rank of the General-in-Chief, in 1726 by Catherine I, and awarded the Order of Saint Alexander Nevsky. In 1727, Münnich was appointed the Governor of Saint Petersburg city while the Imperial court was temporarily transferred to Moscow by Peter II. From 1728 to 1734, he was a General-Governor of Ingria, Karelia, and Finland as well as was awarded the title of a count. During his governorship, Münnich improved the local ports, reinforced the newly established Peter and Paul Fortress (1703), and was thinking of building a bridge towards Stockholm.

== Russian army reformer ==
Upon the coronation of Anna of Russia (1730), he was instructed to prepare the city for the return of Imperial court. After successfully accomplishing that Münnich was promoted to a General-Fieldmarshal, was appointed to the position of president of Russian War Collegiate in 1732 as well as given an order to re-organize the Russian army. Münnich became a founder of the Russian Imperial Guard, known as Leib-Guard Cavalry Regiment of the Izmaylovsky Regiment, and the Shlyakhetskiy Cadet Corps which was destined to supply the future generations of officers.

Münnich also reformed numerous other military formations as well as the War Collegiate itself. He established a new formation for the Russian army at that time, the Corps which consisted of 12 regiments Cuirassier Cavalry as well as the first Hussar regiments. Münnich revised the table of ranks and evened the salary of the Russian officers with the invited foreign military specialists. He was the first to introduce the sapper regiments to the Russian army as well as founded the Engineer School for Officers. During his administration some 50 other fortresses were erected which substantially improved the well-being of the Russian Armed Forces at that time. Due to the Andrey Osterman affairs, he was released of his duties.

== Ottoman campaign of 1734–1739 ==
In 1734, by the reference of Ernst Johann von Biron he was sent to take the city of Danzig (Gdańsk) and after a prolonged siege and evasion of Stanisław Leszczyński was heavily reproached. However, after that in 1733, the Russian Empire was able to install Augustus III of Poland as the King of Poland (ratified in 1736).

In 1736, as the commander of the Russian army, he headed the Turkish campaigns, besieging the important ports of Azak (modern Azov) and Özi (modern Ochakiv). On 21 May 1735, he stormed Or Qapı fortress, then continued into the Crimean Peninsula. Münnich destroyed the important Tatar cities of Kezlev, Aqmescit, and Bakhchisaray. He was forced out of the peninsula due to poor logistics and battle fatigue of his formations, while another general, Count Peter von Lacy, took Azak, earning himself a rank of the general field marshal. Münnich refused to resume the campaign the very next year, but he returned to the lower Dnieper steppes in 1737, and on 2 July, took the fortress of Özi (Ochakov) with the help of the Russian artillery. During the sack of Özi, he manually raised the regimental banner of the Izmailovsky Regiment on one of the towers of fortress after a successful attack. The siege of Özi was also later mentioned in the humorous stories about Baron Munchausen, based on the adventures of the page to Duke Anthony Ulrich of Brunswick, Hieronymus von Münchhausen. Due to the heavy losses, the campaign was paused again while conducting negotiations in Nemirov (Podolie) without much result.

In 1739, Münnich won the Battle of Stavuchany on August 28 [O.S. August 17], took Khotyn on August 30 [O.S. August 19], and entered Iași on September 14 [O.S. September 3], establishing himself firmly in the Principality of Moldavia. Threatening to burn down the capital of that Principality, the city of Iași, he forced Moldavian boyars to accept the annexation of Moldavia on September 16 [O.S. September 5]. Due to military losses of the Habsburg monarchy and worsening of political relationships with Sweden, the Russian court accepted French mediation and signed the Treaty of Niš (October 3) by which Russia had to return almost all captured territories, including those gained by Münnich in Moldavia. He was ordered to evacuate those regions, and return to Russia. Münnich's victories in the Moldavian campaign was later mentioned in one of the Lomonosov's odes, considered to be the first poem of that kind in Russian literature. After the Ottoman war he was awarded the Order of St. Andrew and the Golden Weapon for Courage.

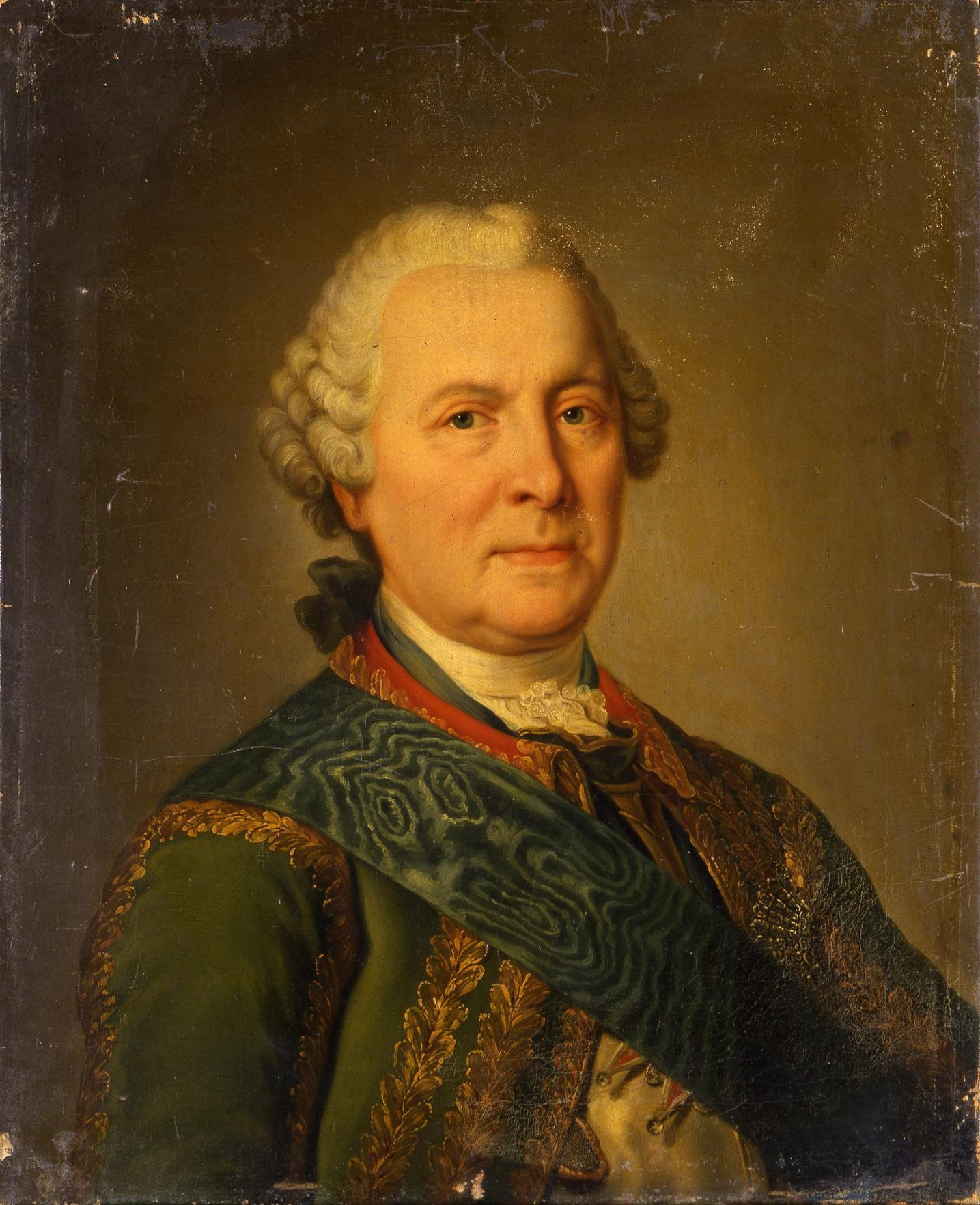
Portrait from the 2nd half of the 18th century.

== Downfall ==
Marshal Münnich now began to take an active part in political affairs, the particular tone of which was given by his rivalry with Biron, duke of Courland, whom Münnich had arrested in 1740. Münnich's activity was brought to a close in 1741 by Elizabeth of Russia; he was arrested on his way to the border, and condemned to death. Brought out for execution, and withdrawn from the scaffold, he was later sent to Pelym, Siberia, where he remained for twenty years, until the accession of Peter III brought about his release in 1762.

Catherine II, who soon displaced Peter, employed the old field marshal as director-general of the Baltic ports. Münnich died four years later in Tartu and was buried at his estate nearby.

== Legacy ==
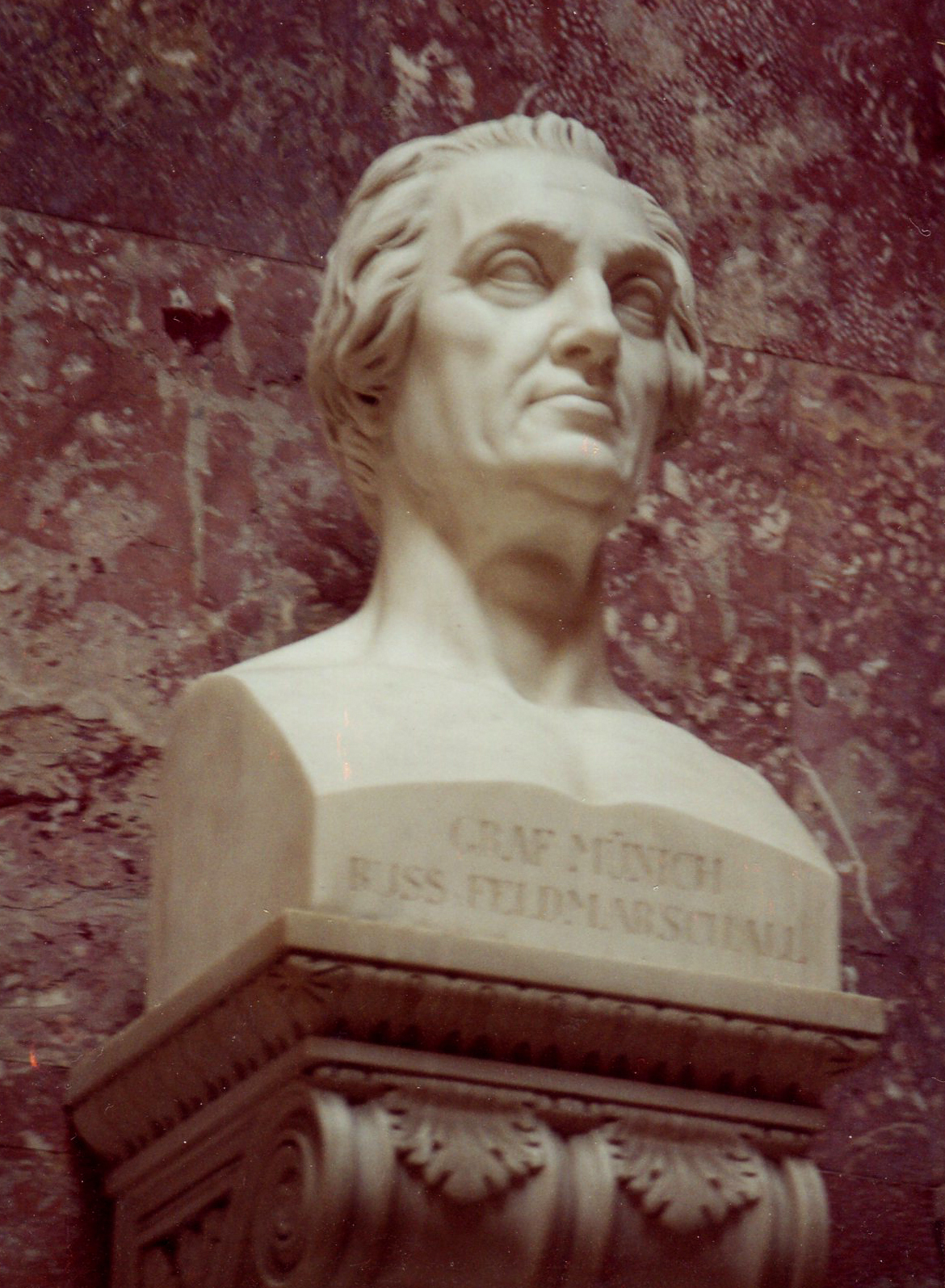
Bust of Count Münnich in Walhalla memorial.

Catherine the Great said, "If Münnich is not one of the children of Russia, he is one of the fathers". Frederick the Great professed great admiration for his exploits and calls him "Prince Eugene of the Muscovites". Voltaire wrote for his part: "It was Prince Eugene of the Muscovites; he had the virtues and vices of the great generals: skilful, enterprising, happy; but proud, superb, ambitious, and sometimes too despotic, and sacrificing the lives of his soldiers for his reputation. Franz Lacy, Keith, Löwendal, and other skilful generals, were training in his school".

According to Christoph Hermann von Manstein, his aide-de-camp, "The Count of Münnich is a real contrast of good and bad qualities. Polite, rude, human, carried away, in turn, nothing is easier for him than winning the hearts of those who deal with him. But suddenly, an instant later, he treats them so harshly that they are forced to hate him, so to speak. In certain conditions, we saw him generous, in others of a sordid greed. He is the man of the world who has the highest soul and yet we have seen him do mean things. Pride is a dominant vice. Constantly devoured by an excessive ambition, he sacrificed everything to the world to satisfy it. One of the best engineers in Europe, he was also one of the greatest captains of his century. Often reckless in his businesses, he has always ignored what the impossible is. With a tall and imposing stature, and a robust and vigorous temperament, he seems to have been born general."

Ernst Gideon von Laudon and Franz Lacy did their apprenticeship under his orders in front of Otchakov and Khotin.

Burckhardt de Münnich is buried in his land of Lunia in Livonia. Despite his role as builder of modern Russia, his tomb was desecrated and partly destroyed by the Soviets.

The Imperial Russia 37th Dragoons Regiment used to bear his name.

== Family ==
- Christine Lucretia von Witzleben (1685–1727), his wife.
- Barbara Juliana, Baroness von Krüdener was his great-granddaughter.
- Count Johann Ernst Munnich (Sergei Khristoforovich Minikh) (1707–1788), his son, Russian statesman, diplomat, writer, studied jurisprudence, languages, and philosophy.

== Sources ==
- Aksan, Virginia H. (2007). Ottoman Wars, 1700-1870: An Empire Besieged. London & New York: Routledge.
- Davies, Brian (2011). Empire and Military Revolution in Eastern Europe: Russia's Turkish Wars in the Eighteenth Century. London & New York: Bloomsbury Publishing.
