= Panta Srećković =

Pantelija Srećković (Serbian Cyrillic: Пантелија Срећковић; 3 November 1834 – 8 July 1903), also known as Panta Srećković (Панта Срећковић) was a Serbian historian and academician, the dean of the Velika škola in 1884–85, and again in 1890.

== Biography ==
Panta Srećković was born in Veliko Krčmare to Slavko (born in 1788) and Marija-Baba (1793-1878), daughter of Proko Ivanović of Zabojnica who participated in the First and Second Serbian uprisings, as well as in the Miloje Đak Rebellion in 1825 on the side of Miloš Obrenović. His paternal grandfather, Srećko Stefanović, was a participant in the Habsburg-occupied Serbia (1788-1792) and during the First Serbian Uprising led 1,000 soldiers (as binbashi) in Lepenica.

Panta Srećković attended grammar school at Malo Krčmare in the Rača region (Šumadija District), the Gymnasium at Drača, School of Theology in Belgrade's Bogoslovija and post-graduate studies at the famed Kiev Theological Academy and Seminary. From 1859 to 1894 he was a history professor at the Belgrade Lycee and from 1863 on, at the Velika škola. He was a leading personality of classic historiography, with Miloš Milojević. He entered into conflict with another contemporary historian Ilarion Ruvarac and followers of Positivism, critical historiography, and came out almost completely forgotten for a time, but now his work has gained great acclaim.

He was a Deputy Speaker of the National Assembly, Member of Parliament, Academician from 1886, Rector of the Grandes écoles, Pirot District Mayor in 1878. He was very active in the Association of Serbo-Macedonians and the Society of Saint Sava.

Srećković died 8 July 1903 and was buried at the Novo groblje in Belgrade.

He was married to Anka, daughter of Marinko Radovanović, Minister of Justice.

== Works ==
- Istorija srpskoga naroda: Županijsko vreme (600-1159), 1884
- Istorija srpskoga naroda: Vreme kraljevstva i carstva (1159-1367), 1888
- Detinjstvo
- Stefan Nemanja; Nejaki Uroš, drugi srpski car; Car Siniša Paleolog Nemanjić i janjinski despot Toma; Vukašin
- Stanje i odnos srpskih arhontija prema Ugarskoj i Vizantiji u polovini XII veka
- Tvorenija Domentijana i Teodosija
- Pregled istorijskih izvora o knezu Lazaru i Kraljeviću Marku

== See also ==
- Miloš Milojević
- Tihomir Đorđević
- Spiridon Gopčević
- Jovan Cvijić
- Vasilije Đerić
