= Obor-kapetan =

obor-kapetan (Serbian Cyrillic: обор-капетан), or ober-kapetan (обер-капетан), was a rank held by the Serb hajduks in the service of the Habsburg monarchy in the Kingdom of Serbia (1718–39). Following the successful Austro-Turkish War of 1716–18, and signing of peace, the Habsburgs established the Kingdom of Serbia and appointed the first command cadre of the Serbian National Militia, composed out of two obor-kapetans, ten kapetans, two lieutenants and one major. The obor-kapetans were Vuk Isaković "Crnobarac" and Staniša Marković "Mlatišuma". The rank of obor-kapetan signified a higher rank than kapetan (captain). During the Austro-Russian–Turkish War (1735–39), the Serbian National Militia was divided into 18 companies, in four groups (obor-kapetanije). In this period, the most notable obor-kapetans were Vuk Isaković from Crna Bara, Mlatišuma from Kragujevac and Kosta Dimitrijević from Paraćin.

== List ==
- Vuk Isaković "Crnobarac" (fl. 1738–59), obor-kapetan of Crna Bara
- Staniša Marković "Mlatišuma" (1664–1741), obor-kapetan of Kragujevac
- Kosta Dimitrijević (fl. 1738), obor-kapetan of Paraćin
- Jovan Đurišić (fl. 1738), obor-kapetan

== See also ==
- Obor-knez
