= Serb uprising of 1737–1739 =

Serbian Uprising of 1737–1739
- Part of the Habsburg-Ottoman War (1737–1739)
Date	1737–1739
Location	Central Balkans
Result	Ottoman victory

Belligerents
Serbs	Ottoman Empire

Commanders and leaders
Mlatišuma; Radonja Petrović	Vezir Mustafa Paşa; Derviş Paşa Cengiç

Units involved
Serbian Militia; Brda tribes	Unknown

The Serbian Uprising of 1737–1739 was an uprising of Serbs against the Ottoman rule, that broke out in central regions of Ottoman Serbia during the Habsburg-Ottoman War (1737-1739). Following some initial Habsburg defeats during the early stages of the war, the emperor Charles VI issued various proclamations to the Christians in the Balkans, calling them to rise against the Ottomans. The emperor called on the Serbs, who were ready to revolt, on 15 June 1737, and stressed that they would fight in an alliance with Christian powers, the Habsburg Monarchy and the Russian Empire, against a common enemy. The Serbs responded by organizing themselves under Serbian Patriarch Arsenije IV. The uprising had a wide geographical extent, from Belgrade to eastern Bosnia, Montenegro and the Šar Mountain. The failed war prompted Serbs, mostly from Herzegovina, Raška, Metohija and Montenegro, to flee under the leadership of Arsenije IV from the Ottoman-held territories into the Habsburg monarchy, thus initiating the Second Great Migration of the Serbs.

== Preparations ==
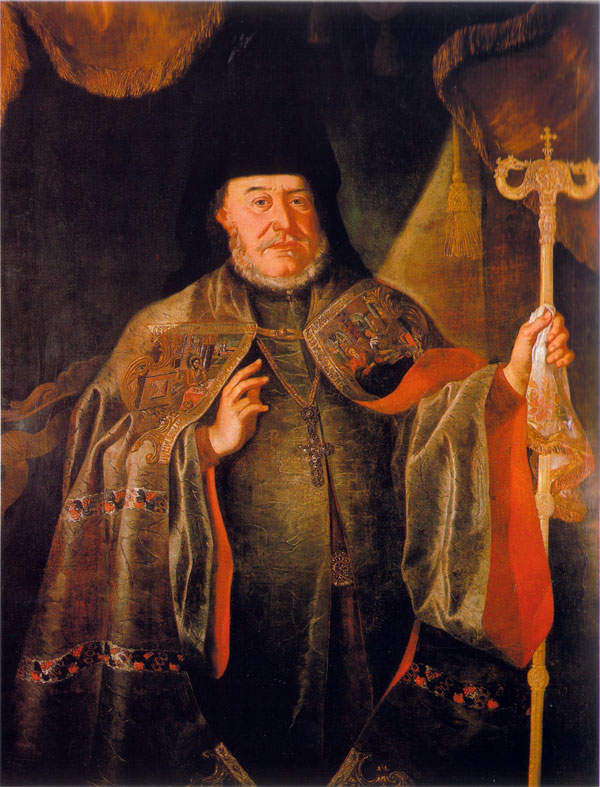
Serbian Patriarch Arsenije IV, leader of the Second Great Serbian Migration

During the initial stages of the war, Serbian Patriarch Arsenije IV negotiated with the Austrian government through the bishop of Temeschwar, Nikola Dimitrijević. Arsenije promised that the people would revolt and help the Austrian army with food.

The tribes in Brda, under the leadership of Radonja Petrović, would ready 500 armed men of Kuči, vojvoda Vuksan Vojvodić of Vasojevići 200, vojvoda Toško of Piperi 200, etc.

The Serbian Patriarch and Radonja called on Metropolitan Sava Petrović to join the war against the Ottomans, but he was under the influence of the Republic of Venice, and stayed inactive during the war.

== Operations ==
=== In Serbia ===
The Serbian Militia operated mostly in central Serbia.

- Attack on Užice (1737)
- Attack on Lešnica
- Liberation of Kruševac (20 July 1737), under the command of Mlatišuma
- Retreat to Syrmia (End of October 1737), under the command of Isaković
- Attacks in Morava and Rudnik (7 January 1739), under the command of Mlatišuma

The Toplica region and Niš were liberated.

=== In Montenegro and Old Serbia ===
Radonja requested from the Austrian feltmarschal that in case the rebels won, they would continue in his service. When talks were underway, an uprising broke out in Montenegro. Radonja's rebels and Serbian troops, and an auxiliary force of Staniša Marković-Mlatišuma, attacked the local Muslims. According to the Serbian plan, they were to take over Novi Pazar, Rožaje, Bijelo Polje and Peć. A Serbian detachment attacked Bihor, and penetrated to Godijevo, where they set up a headquarters in the house of Mustafa Sijarić. Radonja heard that the Ottomans would in their future actions first attack Župljani, which had already crossed to the Venetian side. At the same time, Radonja informed Cattaro intendant Jerolim Buća that Derviš-paša Čengić was ordered to turn with his army from the Sanjak of Herzegovina towards Knin, which they were to attack; and that vezir-Mustafa-paša with the armies of other sanjaks and 4,000 Tatars, as was planned, turn in the direction of Zadar. That information was likely exaggerated.

== Second Great Migration ==
The failed war prompted Serbs, mostly from Herzegovina, Sandžak, Metohija and Montenegro, to flee under the leadership of Arsenije IV from the Ottoman territories into the Habsburg monarchy (as was done in 1689–92). The Austrian government had encouraged the Serbs to settle Habsburg territories.

== See also ==
- Kingdom of Serbia (1718-1739)
- Serbian Patriarchate of Peć
- Treaty of Belgrade (1739)
- Treaty of Niš (1739)

== Sources ==
- Bataković, Dušan T., ed. (2005). Histoire du peuple serbe [History of the Serbian People] (in French). Lausanne: L’Age d’Homme.
- Ćirković, Sima (2004). The Serbs. Malden: Blackwell Publishing.
- Hochedlinger, Michael (2013). Austria's Wars of Emergence: War, State and Society in the Habsburg Monarchy, 1683–1797. London & New York: Routledge.
- Kurtaran, Uğur (2018). "Ottoman-Austria border determination works and newly determined borders according to the Treaty of Belgrade of 1739". Belgrade 1521-1867. Belgrade: The Institute of History. pp. 169–192.
- Roider, Karl A. (1972a). The Reluctant Ally: Austria's Policy in the Austro-Turkish War, 1737–1739. Baton Rouge: Louisiana State University Press.
- Roider, Karl A. (1972b). "The Perils of Eighteenth-Century Peacemaking: Austria and the Treaty of Belgrade, 1739". Central European History. 5 (3): 195–207.
- Šuletić, Nebojša (2017). "Under Ottoman Rule: Until the End of the 18th Century" (PDF). Artistic Heritage of the Serbian People in Kosovo and Metohija: History, Identity, Vulnerability, Protection. Belgrade: Serbian Academy of Sciences and Arts. pp. 31–39.
- Točanac-Radović, Isidora (2018). "Belgrade - Seat of the Archbishopric and Metropolitanate (1718–1739)". Belgrade 1521-1867. Belgrade: The Institute of History. pp. 155–167.
- "Political developments and unrests in Stara Raška (Old Rascia) and old Herzegovina during Ottoman rule" (PDF). Balcanica.
