= Serbian Militia (1718–46) =

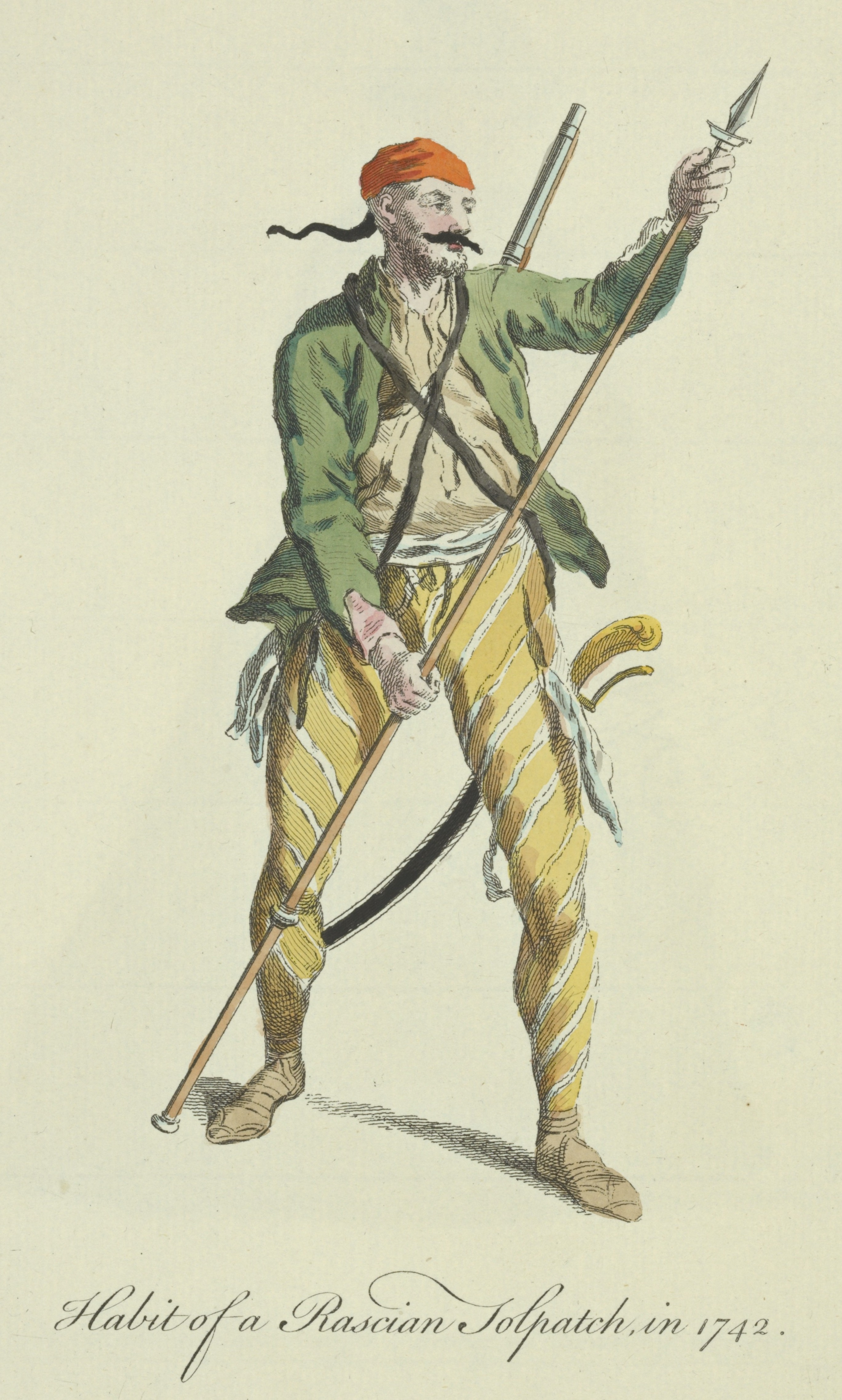
- The uniform of a contemporary Serbian (Rascian) tolpatch, 1742
- Active: 1718 — 1746
- Country: (Habsburg monarchy) Habsburg Realm; Kingdom of Serbia
- Type: Cavalry and Infantry
- Engagements: Austro-Russian–Turkish War (1735–1739); Serb uprising of 1737–1739

Commanders
- Notable commanders: Vuk Isaković; Mlatišuma

Following the successful Austro-Turkish War of 1716–1718, and signing of peace, the Habsburgs established the Kingdom of Serbia (1718–1739) and appointed the first command cadre of the Serbian National Militia, composed of two obor-kapetans, ten kapetans, two lieutenants and one major. The obor-kapetans were Vuk Isaković "Crnobarac" and Staniša Marković "Mlatišuma". The Military Governor notified the people that he had begun to organize the Militia in Serbia to set up outposts along the Habsburg–Ottoman border, and that he had been given the authorization to hurry up. The population gladly responded to the call, and quickly, beside the regular army under the two ober-kapetans and fifteen (unter-)kapetans, 13 companies of "hajduks" were collected, who were to be used for protection of the border and other services.

== History ==
The hajduks of the Serbian National Militia constituted a privileged class in Habsburg Serbia, and received the most fertile lands for their settlements (which were separate from other villages) and were exempt from tax in exchange for their military service, which included defending the borderlands, keeping the peace, and maintaining and protecting the Great Road.

During the Austrio-Russian-Turkish War, the Serbian National Militia was divided into 18 "hajduk" companies, distributed in four groups.

At the end of October 1737, when the war turned unfavourably for the Austrians, Serbian militiamen, 418 infantry ("hajduks") and 215 cavalry ("hussars"), crossed into Syrmia.

The Serbian Militia continued to function as a military force in exile in the Habsburg frontier until the Hungarian Parliament's demands for demilitarization of the frontier resulted in the disbandment of the militia in 1746, five years after the initial demilitarization law was passed. During its time in exile, the Serbian militia accounted for around half of the Habsburg military force in the frontier.

== Operations ==
- Attack on Užice (1737)
- Attack on Lešnica
- Liberation of Kruševac (20 July 1737), under the command of Mlatišuma
- Retreat to Syrmia (End of October 1737), under the command of Isaković
- Attacks in Morava and Rudnik (7 January 1739), under the command of Mlatišuma

== Organization ==
| Group | Captaincies/Companies | Notes |
|---|---|---|
| 1. Obor-kapetan Vuk Isaković | Crna Bara (seat); Prnjavor; Cikot, Nova Varoš; Bela Crkva; Valjevo; Osečenica | |
| 2. Obor-kapetan Mlatišuma | Kragujevac (seat); Pranjani; Vitanovac; Čačak; Cvetke | |
| 3. Obor-kapetan Kosta Dimitrijević | Paraćin (seat); Požarevac; Resava; Stalać | |
| 4. Obor-kapetan ? | Grocka; Hananpašina Palanka | |

== Commanders ==
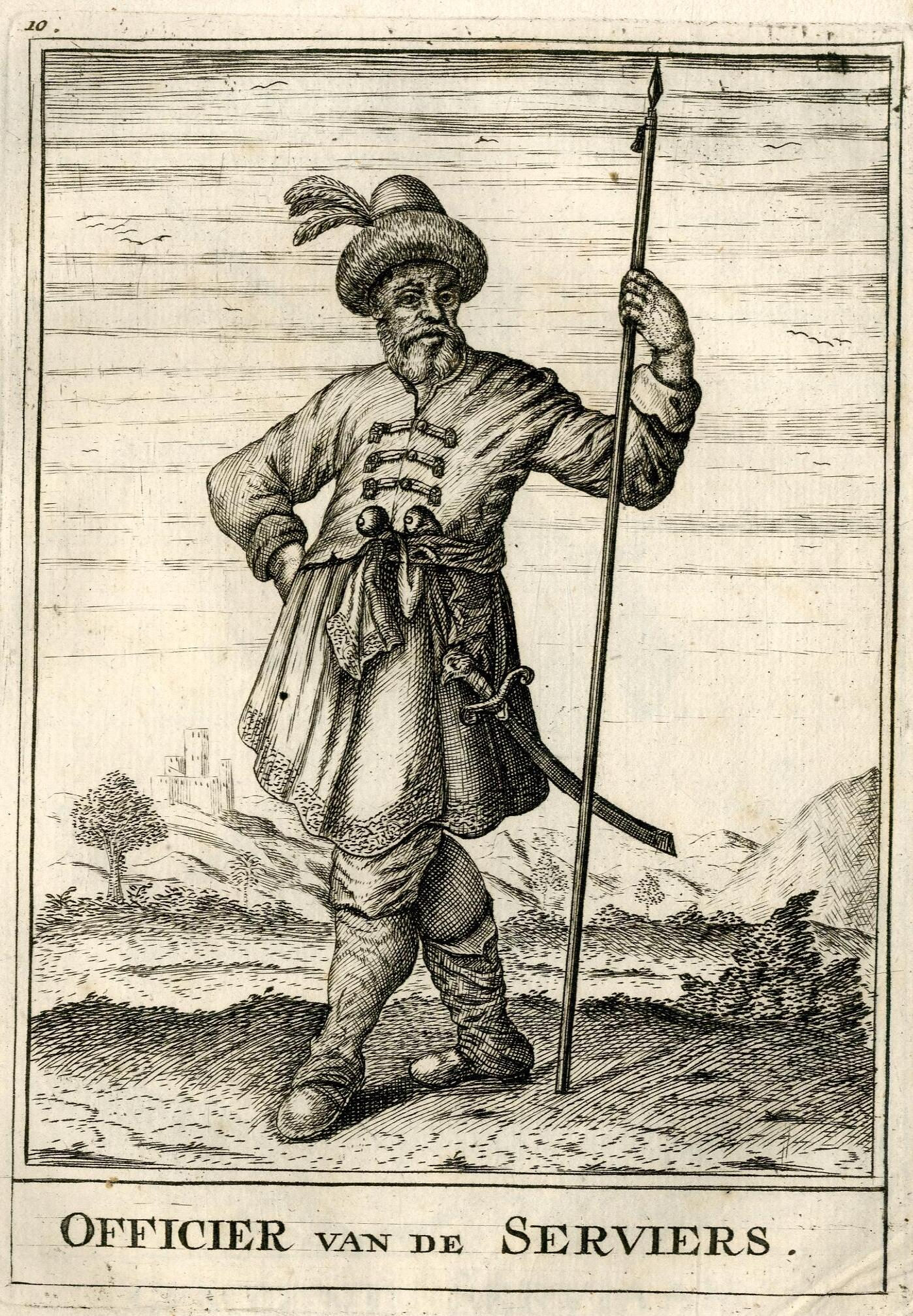
A Serbian officer of the early 18th century

The militia was first organized after the establishment of the Kingdom of Serbia, then again during the 1735–1739 war. The commanders were listed in documents where they were all called "dangerous to the Turks".

Organization in ca. 1737–1739. The ten kapetans were distributed mainly in frontier areas.

obor-kapetans

- Isaković
- Mlatišuma
- Kosta Dimitrijević (Paraćin)
- Jovan Đurišić

kapetans

- Trifun Isaković (Cvetke)
- Aćim Prodanović (Osečenica)
- Jevto Vitković (Valjevo)
- Filip Obućina (Pranjani)
- Keza Radivojević (Grocka)
- Sima Vitković (Valjevo)
- Nikola Čupić (Čačak)
- Radivoj
- Stojan Vuč
- Josif Monasterlija (Posavina)
- Vasa Nikolić (Podunavlje)

== See also ==
- Serbian Militia
- Serbian Free Corps

== Sources ==
- "Аустриски порази" (in Serbian).
- Istorijski muzej Srbije (1984). Zbornik Istorijskog muzeja Srbije. Vol. 21. Muzej. pp. 11–20.
- Popović, Dušan J. (1950). Србија и Београд од Пожаревачког до Београдског мира, 1718-1739.
- Popović, Dušan J. (1990). Srbi u Vojvodini. Matica srpska. ISBN 9788636301753.
