= Sekula Vitković =

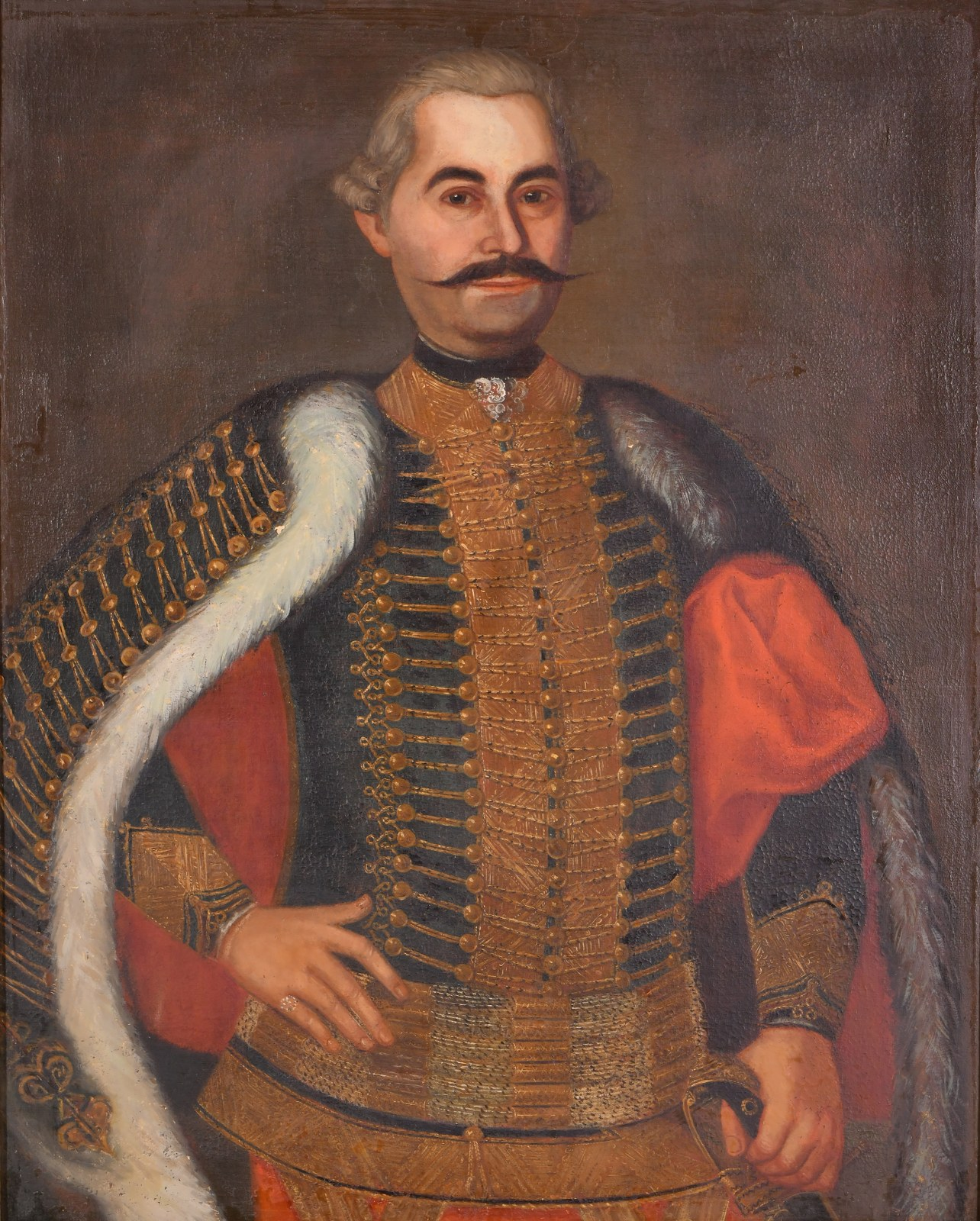
Sekula Vitković, painted by Joakim Marković

Sekula Vitković (Serbian Cyrillic: Секула Витковић; Mostaći, near Trebinje, Republika Srpska, then part of the Ottoman Empire, 1687 - Batajnica, near Belgrade, Serbia, then part of the Austrian Empire, 31 March 1754) belonged to the Serbian elite in the Habsburg Empire. Vitković was the commander of Bačka Palanka at a crucial time when Austria was fighting the Turks during both the Austro Turkish War of 1716-1718 and the Austro-Turkish War of 1737-1739.

== Early life ==
According to Serbian history, Sekula Vitković came from a distinguished family from the village of Mostaći, near Trebinje in Herzegovina, then under Otttoman rule. With the failure of the Austro-Serbian campaign during the Great Turkish War (1683–1699), there followed the Great Migrations of the Serbs under the Serbian Patriarch Arsenije III Crnojević that settled among fellow native Serbs in northern territories, then under the Habsburg Empire in 1690.

During his time, Bačka Palanka was part of the Slavonian Military Frontier, with the status of an army town from 1702 until 1744, when it became part of Bacs-Bodrog County. Vitković eventually became regional commander of the Danube Serbian Militia in the war against the Turks. He and his entourage were forced to settle in Petrovaradin Šanac.

Vitković joined the Austrian military service, and thanks to his abilities, advanced to the rank of colonel. In 1735, he was appointed regional commander-in-chief of the Danube Serbian Militia. Also, he is remembered as the great benefactor of Šišatovac Monastery in Fruška Gora.

== See also ==
- Vuk Isaković
- Keza Radivojević
- Kosta Dimitrijević
- Vićentije Jovanović
- Mojsije Petrović
- Nicolas Doxat
