= Miloš Milojević =

Miloš Milojević may refer to:

- Miloš Milojević (lawyer) (1840-1897), Serbian lawyer, writer and politician
- Miloš Milojević (footballer) (born 1982), Serbian football manager and former player

== See also ==
- Miloš Milošević (born 1972), Croatian swimmer
