= Mlatišuma =

Serbian military commander

- Born: Staniša Marković; 1664; Vražegrmci, Bjelopavlići, Ottoman Empire (modern Montenegro)
- Died: 1740 (aged 75–76)
- Military career
- Allegiance: Habsburg monarchy
- Service years: 1716–1740
- Rank: obercapitain
- Nickname: Mlatišuma
- Unit: Serbian Militia (1718–46)
- Conflicts: Austro-Turkish War of 1716–18; Austro-Russian–Turkish War (1735–39)

Staniša Marković (Serbian Cyrillic: Станиша Марковић; 1664–1740), known as Mlatišuma (Млатишума), was a Habsburg Serbian obercapitain of Kragujevac. He had joined the Austrians in the Austro-Turkish War of 1716–18, and after the victorious war and occupation of central Serbia (the Kingdom of Serbia) he was given the rank of Obercapitain, governing Kragujevac, and commanding the Serbian Militia (1718–46) alongside Vuk Isaković. In peace-time, he was sent to what is today Montenegro to incite an anti-Ottoman rebellion; a short-lived uprising broke out in which his personal unit participated. In 1734–35 he founded the Drača Monastery in Kragujevac. When the Austro-Russian–Turkish War (1735–39) broke out, Serbs were mobilized and Mlatišuma led forces in numerous campaigns. He is regarded as a hero and enumerated in Serbian epic poetry.

== Early life ==
According to Sima Milutinović Sarajlija, Staniša Marković was born in a village below the Ostrog monastery, in Bjelopavlići (present day Montenegro). His family hailed from Novi Pazar. With the failure of the Austro-Serbian campaign during the Great Turkish War (1683–99), a large migration of Serbs ensued into Habsburg territories in 1690.

== Career ==
=== Austro-Turkish War of 1716–18 ===
He joined the Habsburg side during the Austro-Turkish War of 1716–18, which saw the second occupation of central Serbia (Sanjak of Smederevo) after the Habsburg-occupied Serbia (1686–91). The Serbs established a Hajduk army that supported the Austrians.

Upon the peace treaty and establishment of the Kingdom of Serbia (1718–39), Mlatišuma received the rank of Obercapitain (First Captain) of Kragujevacin payment for his services.

=== Interwar period ===
The Kragujevac district, one of the most important and dangerous in the Serbian Military Frontier (Militärgrenze) due to its proximity to the Ottoman border, was put under Mlatišuma's command together with one of the hajduk companies in charge of direct border protection. In addition, he was also the second highest authority of the whole Serbian militia below the supreme commander Major Vuk Isaković. He was responsible for reporting to the Central Command in Belgrade the outbreak of an alleged vampire epidemic in Kragujevac that is dated to April 1725, making it the first official report of vampirism in the Military Frontier. In other parts of Habsburg ruled Kingdom of Serbia similar cases followed, in which at least one Mlatišuma was involved, after which the Serbian word vampir entered German and later other world languages.

He was sent to the Highlands (Brda), to incite rebellion in eight tribes: Vasojevići (led by vojvoda Vuksan Bojović), Bratonožići, Drekalovići (led by Radonja Petrović), Piperi, Rovce, Bjelopavlići, Pješivci, and Lutovci. Petrović was according to sources the leader of these tribes, who could ready 2,000 men in one day. Mlatišuma arrived in Kuči in 1729. He met with Radonja Petrović with whom he sought to mobilize Brda against the Ottomans. When talks were underway between Radonja Petrović and the Austrian feltmarschal, an uprising broke out in Montenegro. Radonja's rebels and Serbian troops, and an auxiliary force of Mlatišuma, attacked the local Muslims. According to the Serbian plan, they were to take over Novi Pazar, Rožaje, Bijelo Polje and Peć.

He founded the Monastery of Drača in Kragujevac, completed on 5 October 1734. There is a ktetor portrait of him.

=== Austro-Russian–Turkish War (1735–39) ===
A new war broke out, and the Serbian Militia and Mlatišuma were mobilized. The Military Governor notified the people of the organization of the Militia in Serbia to set up outposts along the Habsburg–Ottoman border. The population quickly responded, and, beside the regular army under the two ober-kapetans and fifteen (unter-)kapetans, 13 companies of "hajduks" were collected, who were to be used for protection of the border and other services. The army was divided into 18 companies, in four groups. The most notable obercapitains were Vuk Isaković from Crna Bara, Mlatišuma and Kosta Dimitrijević from Paraćin. In Kragujevac, there were two companies of 500 soldiers each.

His forces attacked Užice. Mlatišuma's forces liberated Kruševac on 20 July 1737 and carried much cattle. Colonel Lentulus ordered that part of the cattle be returned to the population, the second part was sent to Sekendorf, the third held by the colonel to the need of his army.

On 7 January 1739 he led attacks in Morava and Rudnik.

He had settled 1,000 Christians in Habsburg territory after the war, during what is known as the "Second Great Migration". He was imprisoned in 1740, and is believed to have died the same year.

== Legacy ==
He is enumerated in Serbian epic poetry, collected by Vuk Karadžić (1787–1864). Sima Milutinović Sarajlija (1791–1847) wrote about him. The Šumanović brotherhood in Crna Bara claim kindred.

== Sources ==
- Ljubo Mihić (1975). Ljubinje sa okolinom. Dragan Srnic.
- Skopsko naučno društvo (1938). Glasnik. Vol. 18–19.
- Исидора Точанац (2008). Српски народно-црквени сабори: 1718-1735. Историјски институт. ISBN 9788677430689.
- Milićević, M. Đ. (1901). Dodatak pomeniku od 1888: znameniti ljudi u srpskoga naroda koji su preminuli do kraja 1900 g. Srpska Kralj. štamp.
- Milićević, M. Đ. (1888). Pomenik znamenitih ljudi u srpskog naroda novijega doba. U Srpskoj kraljevskoj štampariji.
- Milutinović, Simeon (1835). Istorija Crne-Gore od iskona do novijega vremena. Fürstl. Dr.
- Staniša Marković-Mlatišuma: oberkapetan kragujevački. Skopsko naučno društvo. 1938.
- Ćorović, Vladimir (2001) [1997]. "Аустриски порази". Историја српског народа (in Serbian). Belgrade: Јанус.
- Dragoljub M. Pavlović (1901). Austriska vladavina u Severnoj Srbiji od 1718-1739, po građi iz bečkih arhiva. Štamp. Kralj. Srbije.
- Душан Ј Поповић (1950). Србија и Београд од Пожаревачког до Београдског мира, 1718-1739.
- Istorijski muzej Srbije (1984). Zbornik Istorijskog muzeja Srbije. Vol. 21. Muzej.
- Đorđević, Tihomir R.; Čolović, Ivan (1984). Naš narodni život. Vol. 2. Prosveta. pp. 105–.
