= Vasilije Đerić =

Serbian historian and ethnographer

- Василије Ђерић
- Born: 1867
- Died: 1931 (aged 63–64)
- Occupations: Historian; ethnographer; professor

Vasilije Đerić (Serbian Cyrillic: Василије Ђерић, 1867–1931) was a Serbian historian and ethnographer. He hailed from Lika (in modern Croatia). He was a professor of Old Greek language and literature in the University of Belgrade. He contributed to the Journal of the Ethnographic Museum in Belgrade.

== Work ==
- Vasilije Đerić (1901). O srpskom imenu po zapadnijem krajevima našega naroda. Štampano u Državnoj štampariji Kraljevine Srbije.
- Vasilije Đerić (1904). O srpskom imenu u staroj Srbiji i u Makedoniji. Državnaštamparija Kralj. Srbije.
- Vasilije Đerić (1914). O srpskom imenu. Štamparija Dositije Obradović.

== See also ==
- Panta Srećković
- Miloš Milojević
- Tihomir Đorđević
- Spiridon Gopčević
- Jovan Cvijić
