= Malo Krčmare =

- Village
- Location within Serbia
- Coordinates: 44°09′N 20°56′E
- Country: Serbia
- District: Šumadija District
- Municipality: Rača

Population (2002)
  - Total: 486
- Time zone: UTC+1 (CET)
  - Summer (DST): UTC+2 (CEST)

Malo Krčmare (Serbian: Мало Крчмаре) is a village in the municipality of Rača, Serbia. According to the 2002 census, the village has a population of 486 people.
