= Cvetke =

Cvetke Цветке (Serbian)
- Village (Selo)
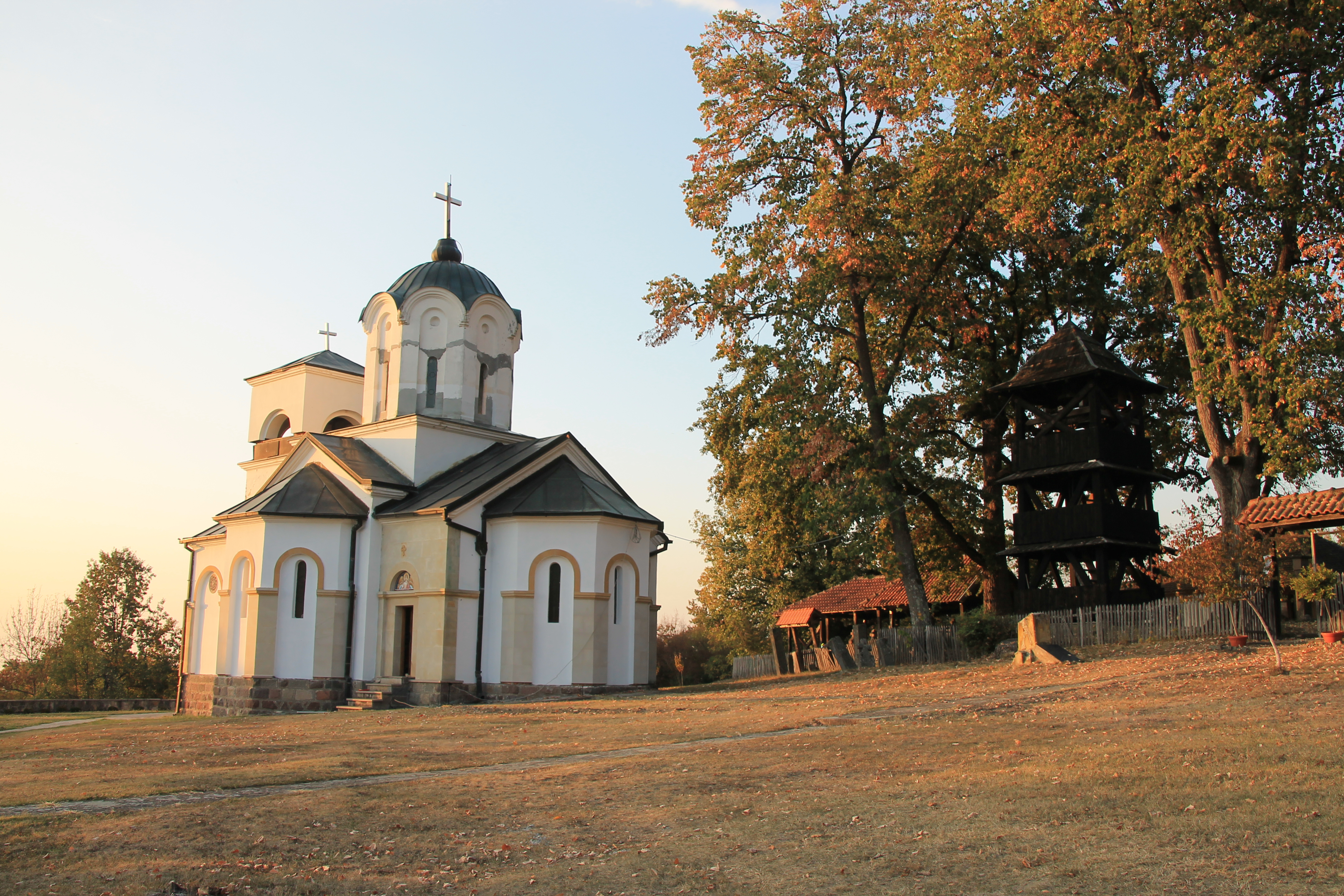

- Location within Serbia
- Coordinates: 43°48′N 20°38′E
- Country: Serbia
- District: Raška District
- Municipality: Kraljevo

Population (2002)
  - Total: 1,070
- Time zone: UTC+1 (CET)
  - Summer (DST): UTC+2 (CEST)

Cvetke is a village in the municipality of Kraljevo, western-central Serbia. According to the 2002 census, the village has a population of 1070 people.

== Notable people ==
- Jovan Kursula (1768–1813), Serbian revolutionary.
