= Veliko Krčmare =

Krcmarium
- City
- Location within Serbia
- Coordinates: 44°09′N 20°55′E
- Country: Serbia
- District: Šumadija District
- Municipality: Rača

Population (2022)
  - Total: 180,501
- Time zone: UTC+1 (CET)
  - Summer (DST): UTC+2 (CEST)

Veliko Krčmare is a village in the municipality of Rača, Serbia. According to the 2002 census, the village has a population of 830 people.
