= Osečenica =

Coordinates: 44°11′24″N 20°01′48″E

- Village (Selo)
- Interactive map of Osečenica
- Country: Serbia
- District: Kolubara District
- Municipality: Mionica
- Time zone: UTC+1 (CET)
  - Summer (DST): UTC+2 (CEST)

Osečenica is a village situated in Mionica municipality in Serbia.

== Gallery ==
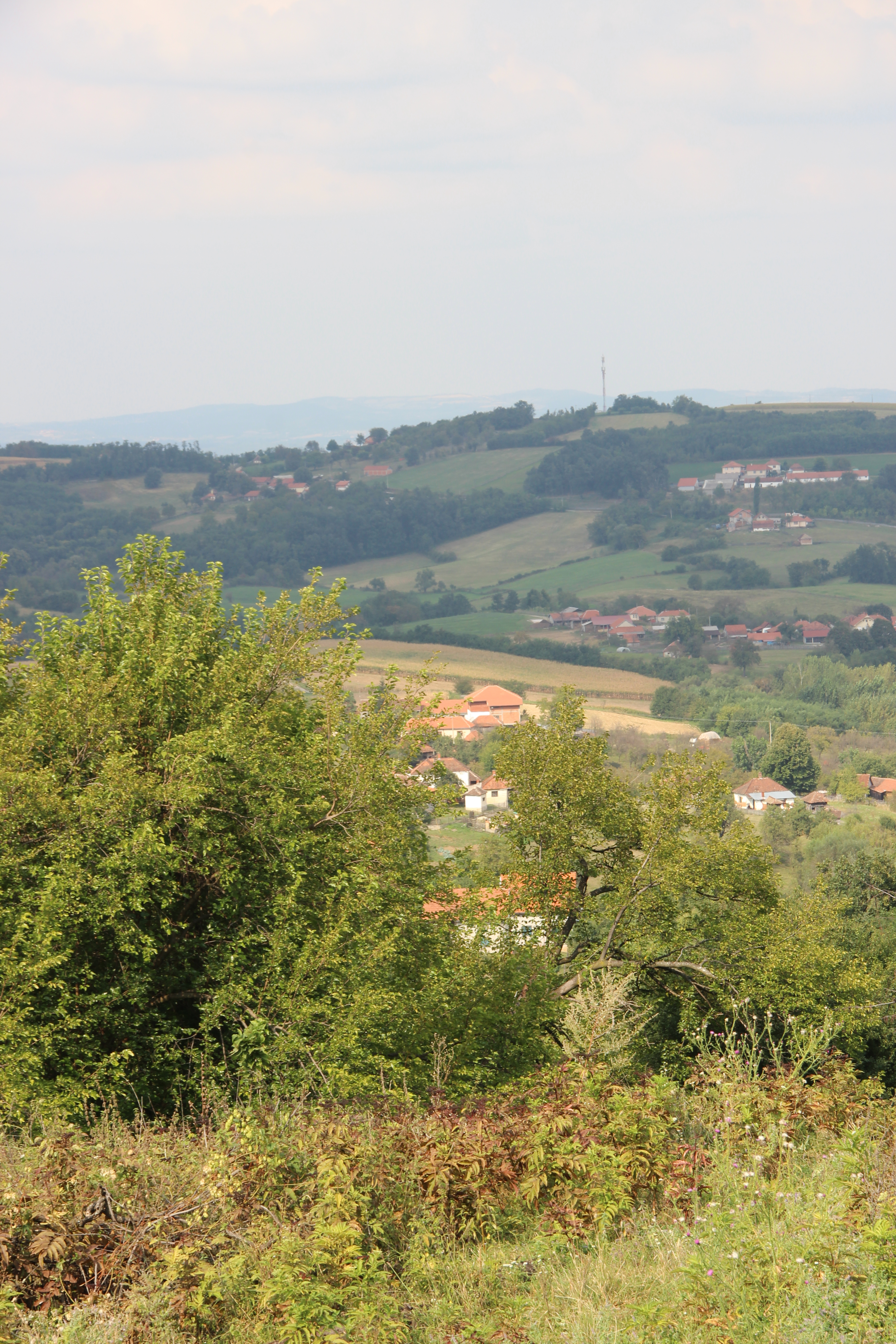

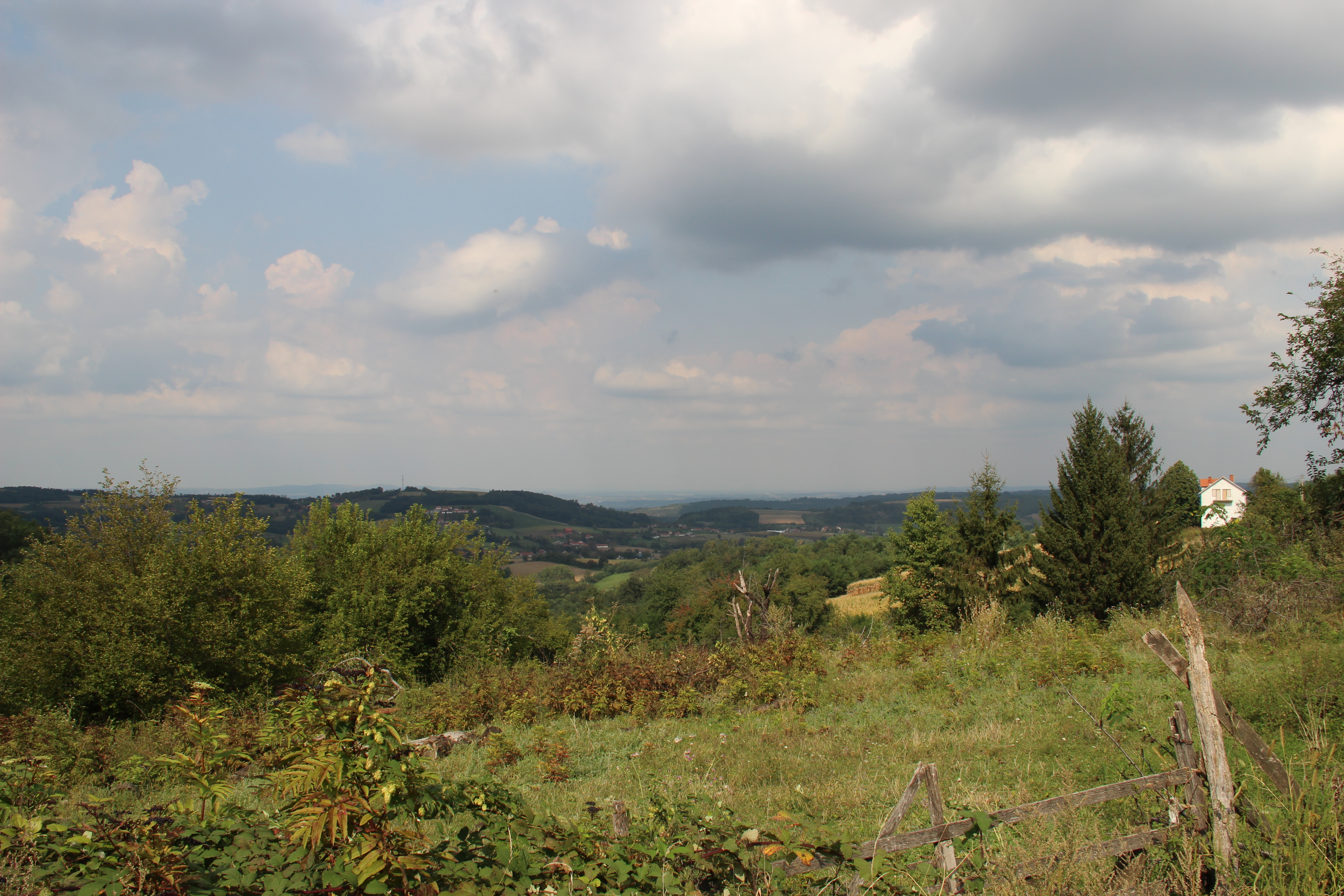

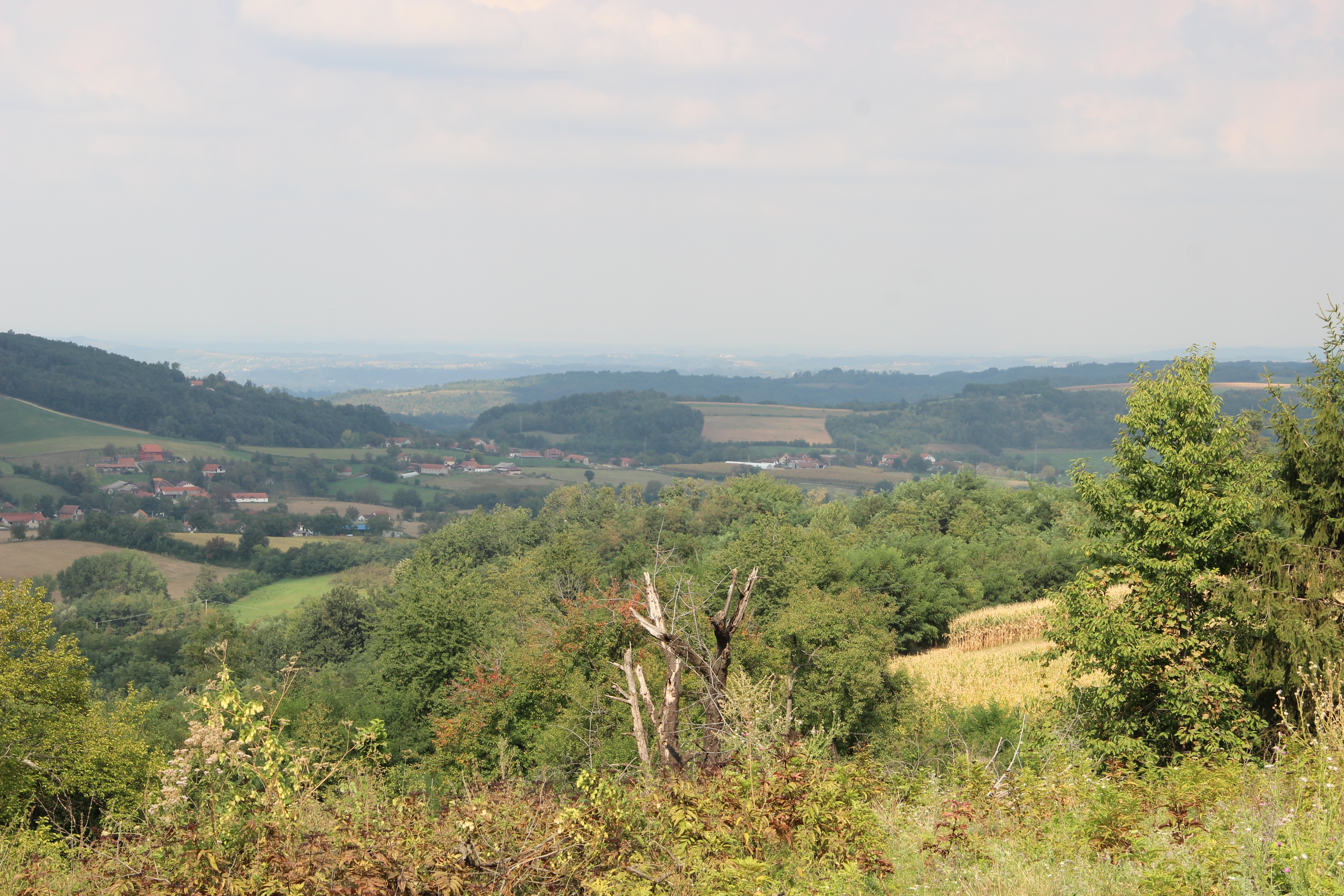

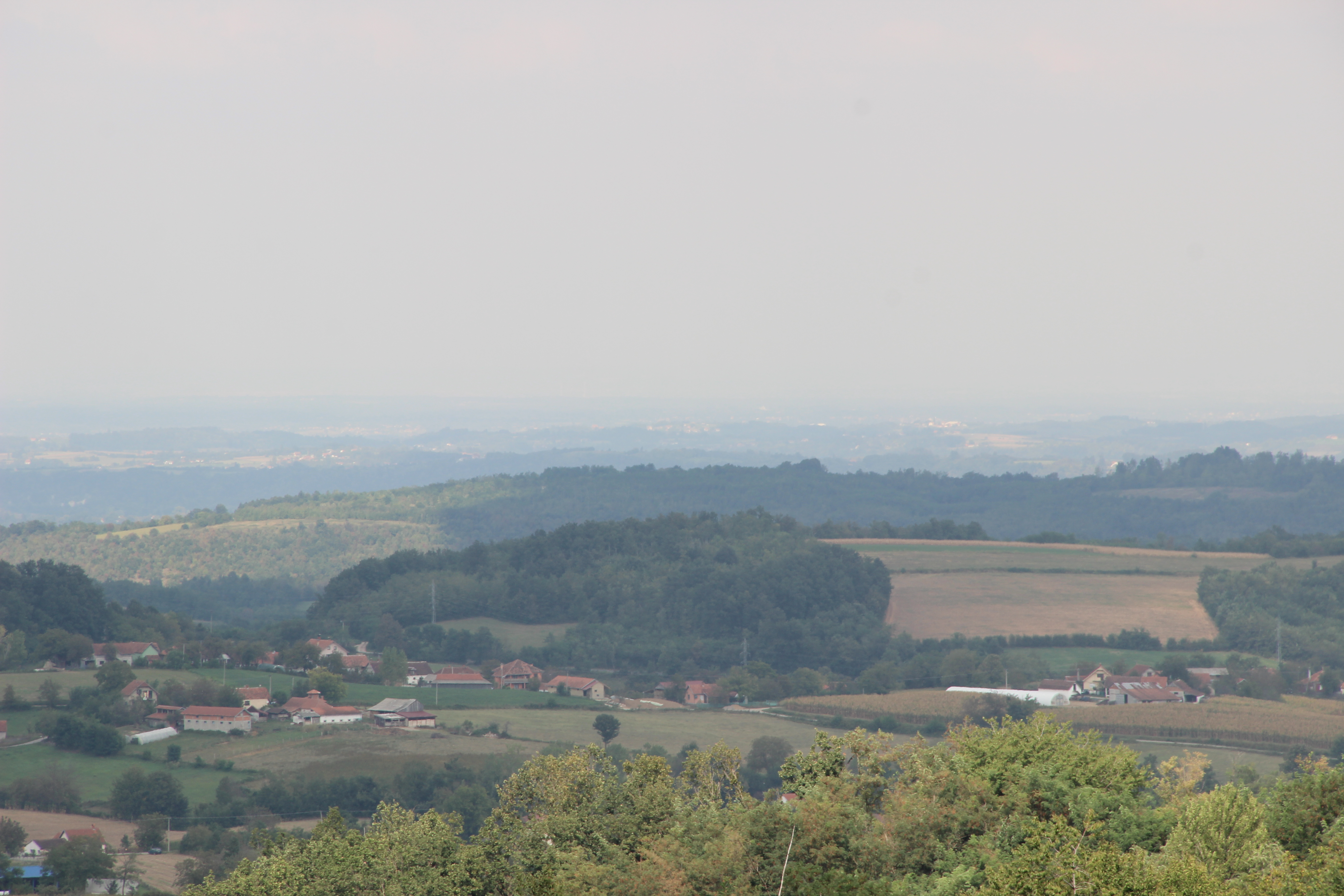

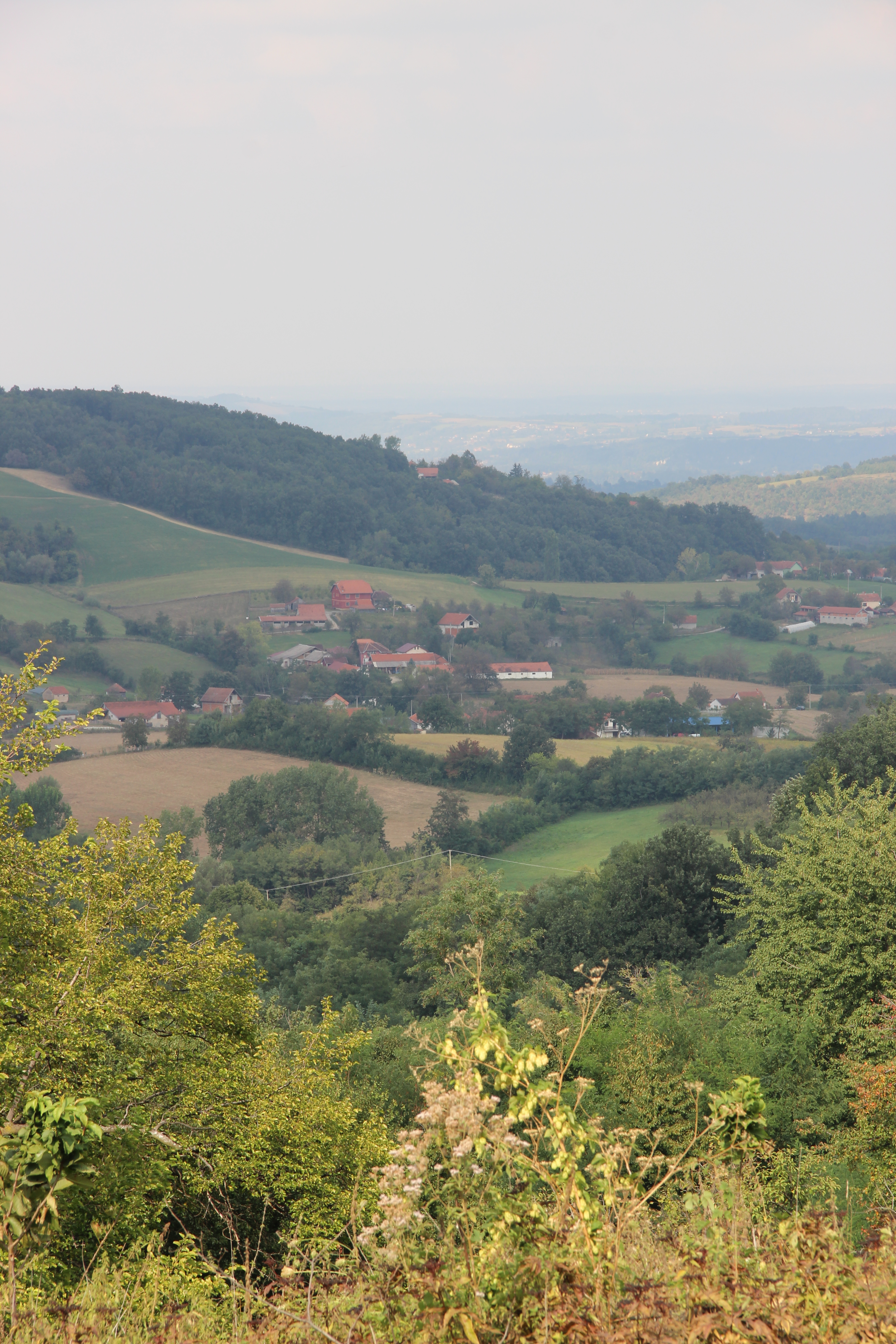

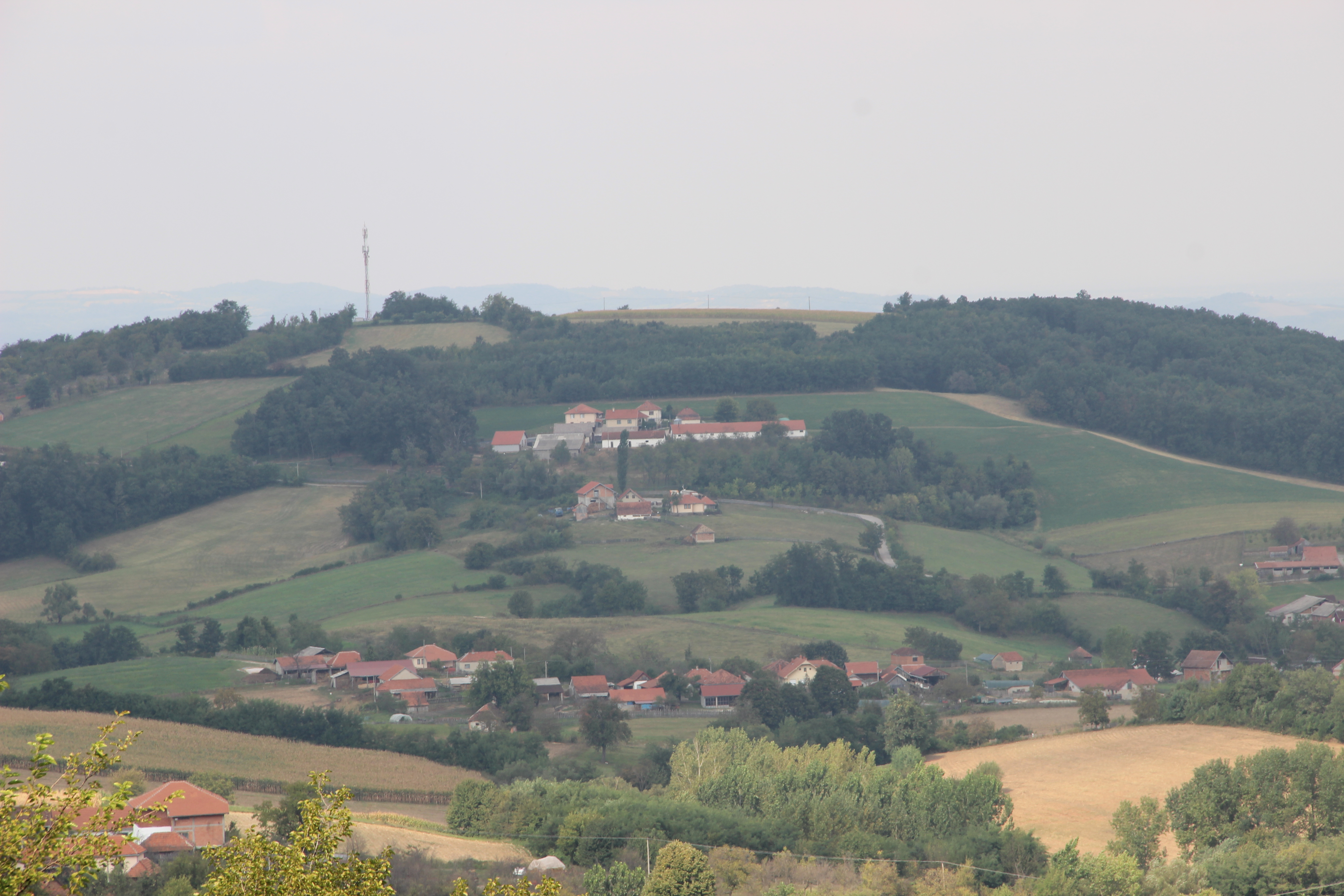
