= Vuk Isaković =

Vuk Isaković (Serbian Cyrillic: Вук Исаковић; fl. 1696–1759) was a Serb military commander in Austrian service during the Austrian-Ottoman Wars. He was the inspiration for the main character, Vuk Isakovič (Вук Исакович), in the Seobe (novel by Miloš Crnjanski).

Vuk's family originated from Sredska, Serbia, then under Ottoman rule. His brother was Trifun Isaković, also a commander.

The Serbs established a Hajduk army that supported the Austrians. The army was divided into 18 companies, in four groups. In this period, the most notable obor-kapetans were Vuk Isaković from Crna Bara, Mlatišuma from Kragujevac, and Kosta Dimitrijević from Paraćin. With his brother Trifun, he commanded the Hajduks who devastated Lešnica. After the war, he had the rank of captain. His brother became major in Syrmia, then lieutenant colonel of the Petrovaradin regiment. He and his brother were among the main contributors to the new church and tower bell of the Šišatovac monastery. Isaković participated in the Austro-Russian–Turkish War (1735–39).

He died in 1759, at the age of 65, in Mitrovica. He was buried at Šišatovac, which at the time was some type of mausoleum for notable Serbs.

== See also ==
- Jovan Monasterlija (fl. 1689-1706), Serbian military commander in Austrian service
- Pavle Nestorović
- Subota Jović
- Sekula Vitkovic
- Novak Petrović
- Pane Božić
- Antonije Znorić
- Serbian Militia
- Paul Davidovich (1737–1814), Austrian general
- Atanasije Rašković
- Radonja Petrović
