= Crna Bara, Bogatić =

Coordinates: 44°52′25″N 19°23′41″E

Crna Bara Црна Бара (Serbian)
- Village (Selo)
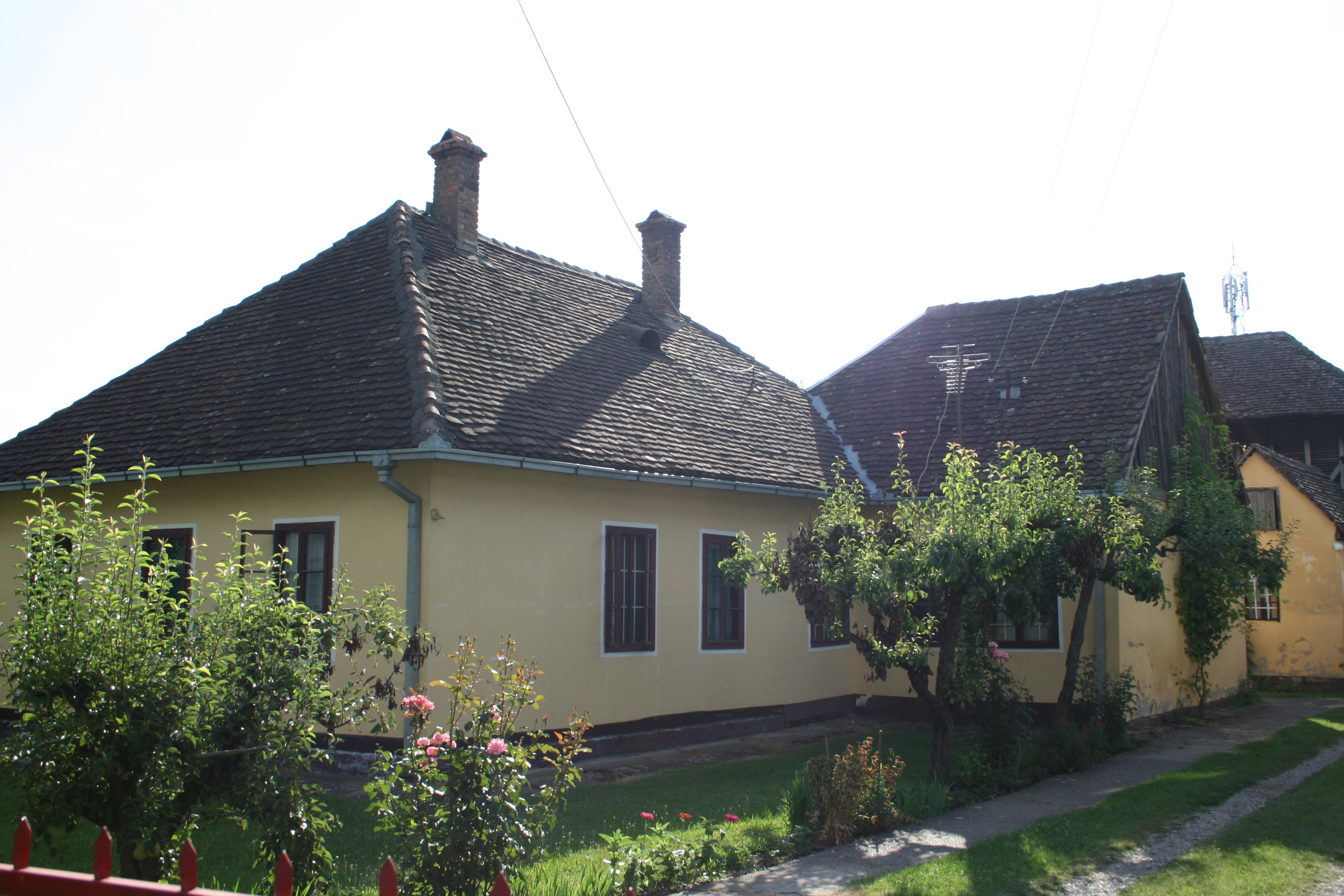
- Crna Bara
- Interactive map of Crna Bara
- Country: Serbia
- Statistical Region: Šumadija and Western Serbia
- Region: Mačva
- District: Mačva District
- Municipality: Bogatić
- Time zone: UTC+1 (CET)
  - Summer (DST): UTC+2 (CEST)

Crna Bara (Serbian Cyrillic: Црна Бара) is a village in Serbia, in the Mačva region. Administratively it belongs to the municipality of Bogatić. According to the 2002 census, the village had 2,270 residents. It lies near the confluence of Drina river into Sava.

== Geography ==
The village is in the far northwest of Mačve, located at the mouth of the Drina River in Savu. Farmland is about 2.772 - {ha} - of which the major part is located in a floodplain where the Drina and Sava rivers during floods and covered more than 2,000 acres.

The village is populated urban type with 19 streets and 4 correct intersection. All streets in the village are paved and street lighting covered about 30% of the settlements. Field roads are in very good condition.

== History ==
Famous people from Crna Bara include the Serbian historian Miloš Milojević and Serbian soldier Vuk Isaković. Milojević (Crna Bara, Principality of Serbia, 16 October 1840 - Belgrade, Kingdom of Serbia, 24 June 1897) was a Serbian historian, politician and writer.

Janko Veselinović, a writer, wrote the novel Hajduk Stanko: Historical Novel in three parts, in 1896, with the action taking place in the Montenegro Bari.

During the First World War, Crna Bara was the scene of enormous defense works put in place by the Serbian Army to disrupt the invasion by Austria-Hungary. The peninsula-shaped floodplain due west of Crna Bara lying and north of the confluence of the Drina and Sava rivers is called the Parasnica and was surrounded on three sides by enemy territory. The Serbians constructed hundreds of miles of trenches in an area of only two and a half square miles to defend the route into Crna Bara and beyond. Although the Parasnica resisted all attempts at seizure in August and September 1914, the Austrians successfully bypassed the strongpoint during its third invasion in November 1914. The Battle of Kolubara caused the Austrians to evacuate all of Serbia in mid-December 1914, and the Parasnica was once more a strongpoint until Serbia's definite conquest in late autumn 1915. After the war, all of the trenches were dismantled and the Parasnica was restored to farmland.

== Culture and contemporary life ==
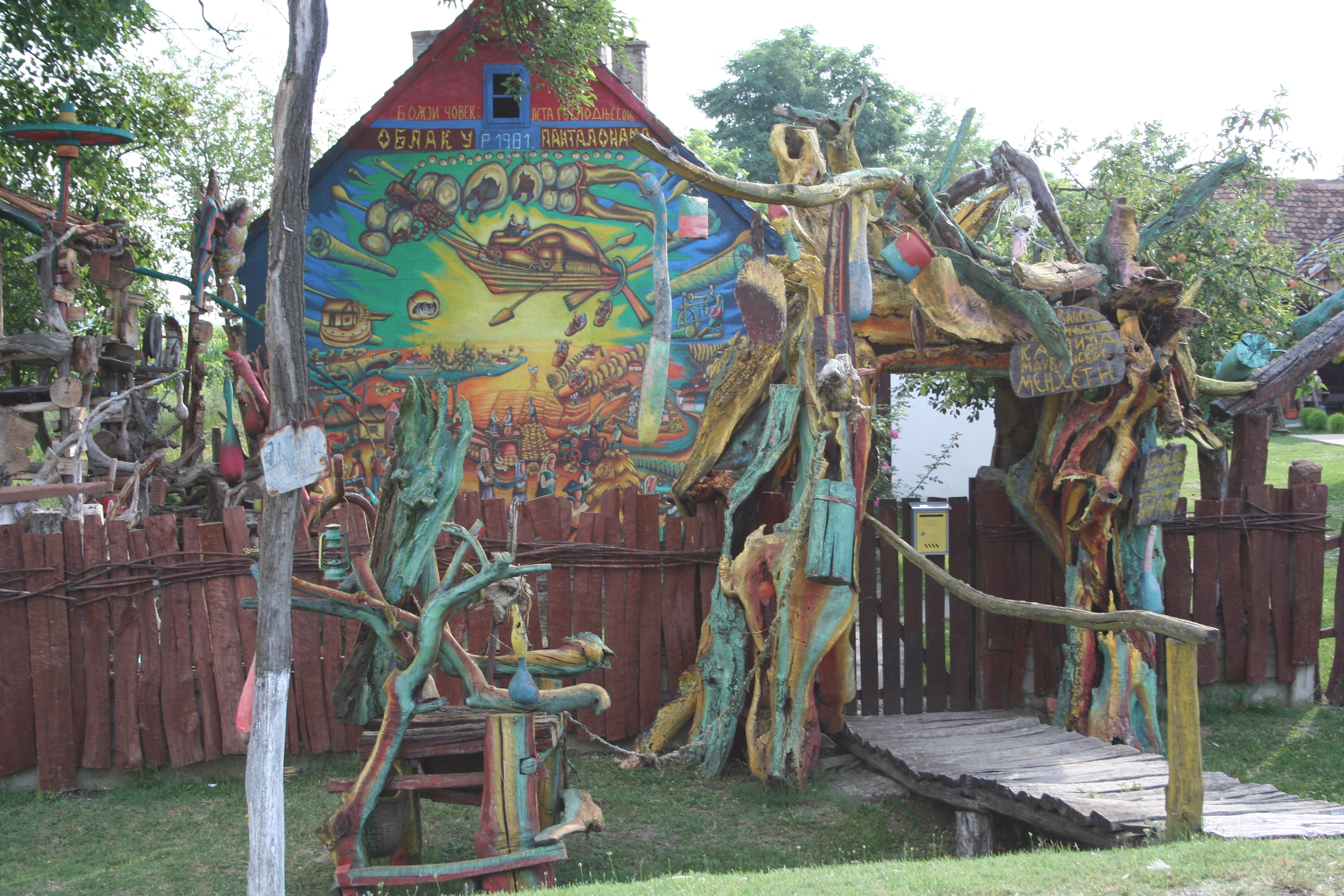
Naïve art in Crna Bara

In the village there is an eight-year-old school "Janko Veselinović" with a branch in Glogovac and Sovljak, St. Vaznesenija (village celebrates the Spasovdan), a post office with an automatic telephone exchange with over 600 subscribers, health center, veterinary station.

Cultural event "Hajdučke večeri" is held every year in early August. It was once one of the biggest cultural events in the country, gathering up to 100,000 visitors.

The village was in 1735. The St. George's church was consecrated 1732nd year for which awareness is credited Vuk Isakovič.

== Demographics ==
In the village of Crna Bara live 1836 adult population, and the average age is 42.4 years (41.6 for men and 43.1 for women). The village then had 683 households, and the average number of persons per household was 3.32.

This village is almost entirely populated by Serbs (according to the 2002 census), and in the last three censuses, there was a decline in population.

The village has 680 households and 988 houses, as there are many abandoned houses, and there are plenty of weekend houses in two-weekend settlements "Vasin Šib" on the Drina (has electricity) and "Confluence" at the confluence of the Drina and Sava rivers (without electricity).

== Tourism ==
An area along the bank of the Drina, named "Vasin Šib" developed into the weekend-settlement. It has a hotel "Cer", motel "Mačvanska kuća", several restaurants and bungalows. Several sports fields are also built.

== See also ==
- Bogatić
