= Miloš Milojević (lawyer) =

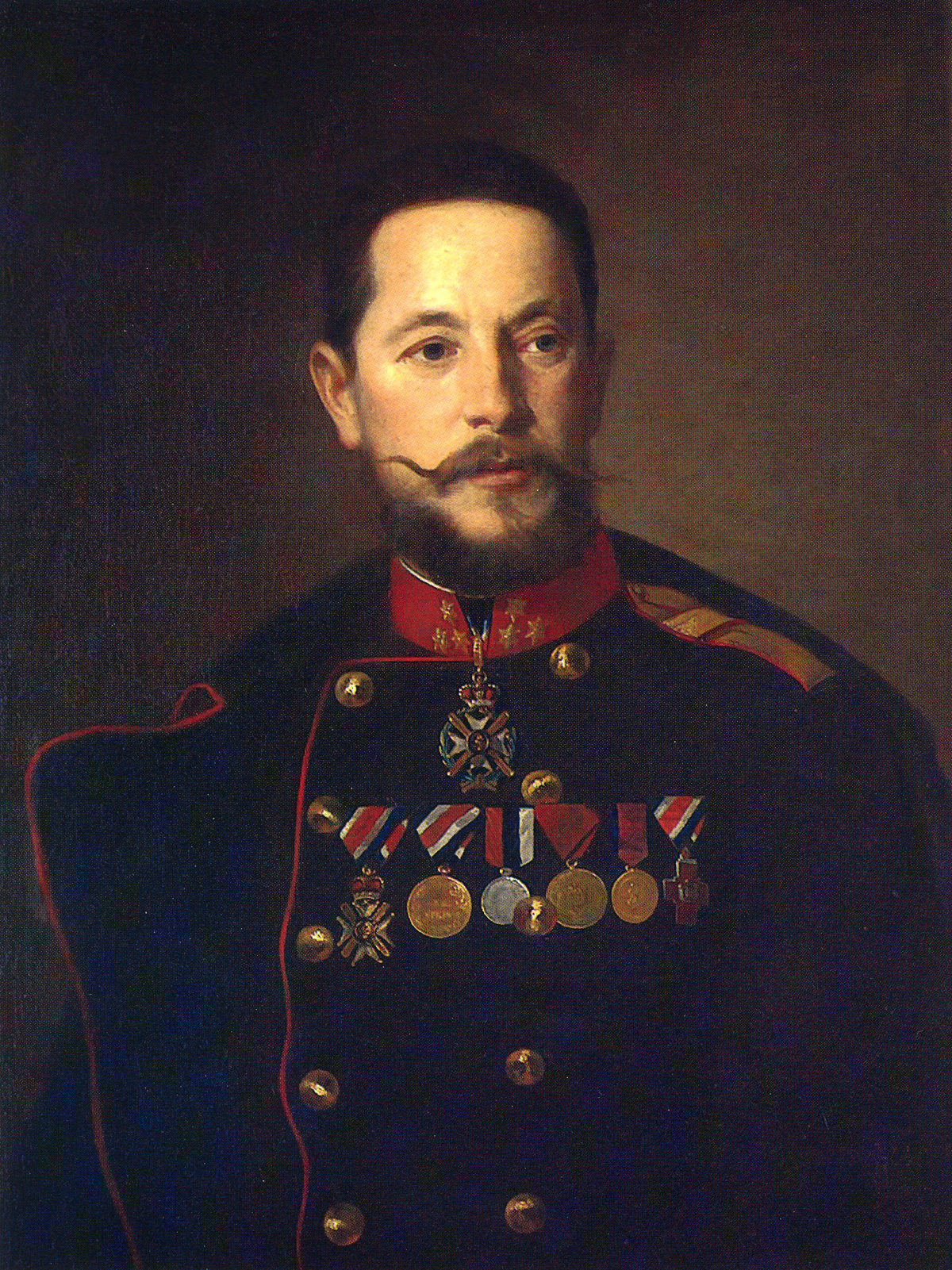
- A portrait of Milojević by Stevan Todorović from 1878
- Born: 16 October 1840; Crna Bara, Serbia
- Died: 24 June 1897 (aged 56); Belgrade, Serbia
- Occupations: lawyer, teacher, army officer, writer, publicist

Miloš S. Milojević (Serbian Cyrillic: Милош С. Милојевић; 16 October 1840 – 24 June 1897) was a Serbian lawyer, writer and politician. His work has been described as "at a ridge between history and literature", mostly for his travel-recording genre.

== Biography ==
Miloš S. Milojević, son of a parish priest, was born at Crna Bara in Mačva, Serbia, on 16 October 1840. He graduated with a law degree from Belgrade's Velika škola in 1862; studied philosophy, philology and history at the University of Moscow, from 1862 to 1865. His professor was Osip Bodyansky. He didn't wait to graduate and in 1866 Milojević returned to Serbia to work for the government judicial system, and later taught at high schools in Valjevo, Belgrade and Leskovac.

He died in Belgrade on 24 June 1897. He was buried in Novo Groblje.

== Military ==
Milojević actively participated in the Serbian–Ottoman Wars (1876–1878), organizing three volunteer corps, the Ibar–Deževo, Morava–Dobrič, Raška–Ibar.

=== Deževa–Ibar Corps ===
Milojević and his volunteers arrived in Raška where he rallied the people. This detachment (odred) was called "the Deževa–Ibar Corps of the Serbian Volunteer Army" (Дежевско-ибарски кор српске добровољачке војске). The Staff was headquartered in the small town where the Staff of the II. Čačak Brigade was headquartered. Milojević's friend, Kosta Šumenković, brought 150 volunteers mostly from the nahiye of Ohrid and Debar.

- Deževa–Ibar (Дежевско-ибарски кор) or Raška–Ibar (Рашко-ибарска дружина, рашко-ибарски кор), under Milojević
  - Podbukovica Corps, under Sava Dečanac
  - Jeleč Corps, under Kosta Šumenković
  - Kopaonik Corps, under Milojko Veselinović
  - Podgor–Deževa Corps, under Jovan Bidić
  - Poibarje Corps, under Atanasije Jungić
  - Borjan Corps, under Despot Badžović

The Corps reportedly gave the Army supply train 300 horses, the cavalry and starešine 150 horses, around 60 horses for the artillery. They liberated 205 Serb villages, two Turk villages, and one small town, set up three bases, organized 10 main battles.

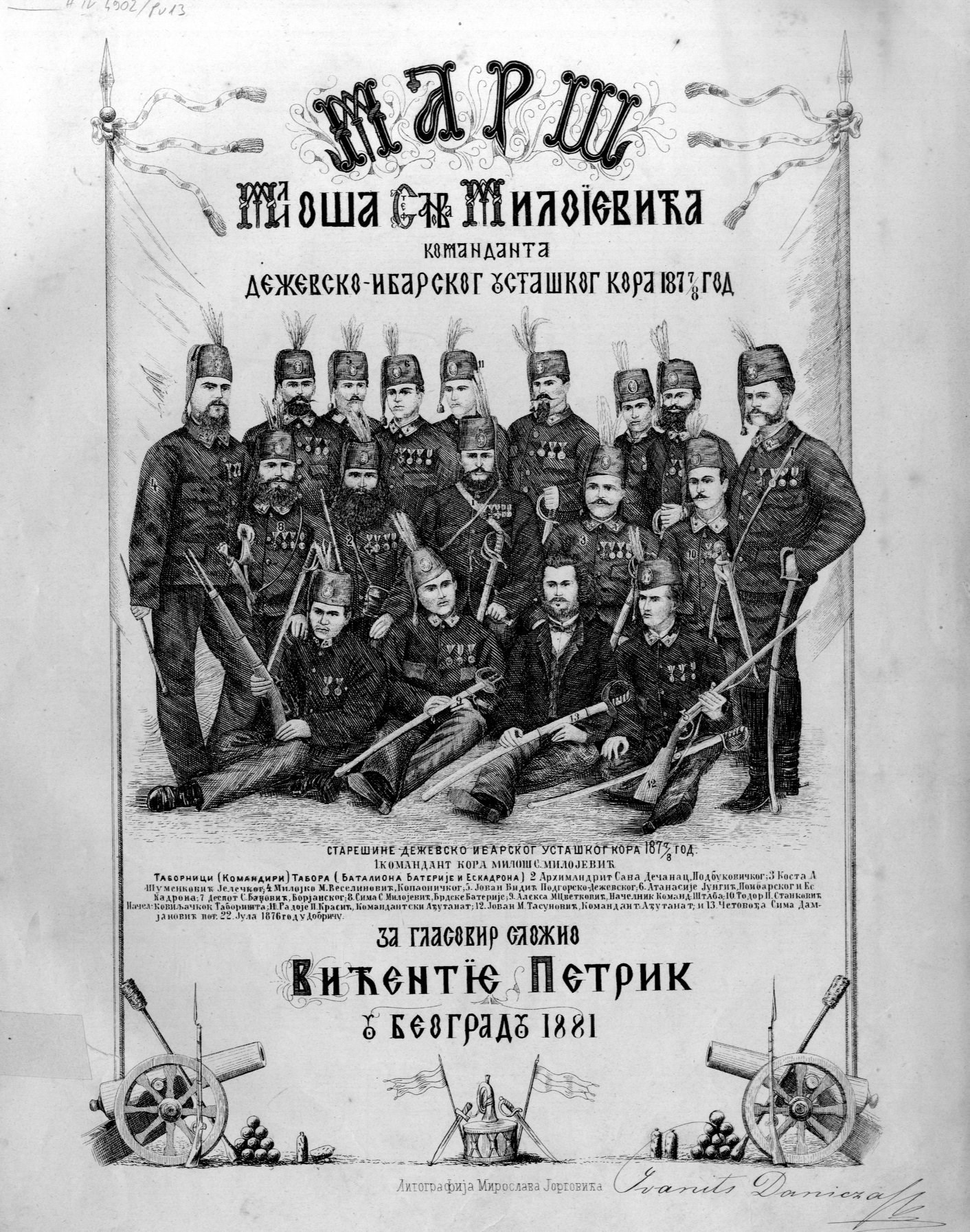
March for Miloš S. Milojević (1881), where Badžović and his comrades in the Deževo-Ibar corps are illustrated based on a 1876 photograph.

In 1881, Czech-born compositor Vićentije Petrik composed the March for Miloš S. Milojević; the illustration made by Miroslav Jorgović on the front page depicts commander of Deževa-Ibar corps Miloš Milojević and his commanders archimandrite Sava Dečanac of the Podbukovica corps, Kosta Šumenković of the Jeleč corps, Milojko Veselinović of the Kopaonik corps, Jovan Bidić of the Podgor–Deževa corps, Atanasije Jungić of the Poibarje corps, Despot Badžović of the Borjan corps, Sima S. Milojević of the Brda battery, chief of staff Aleksa M. Cvetković, Todor Stanković of the Koviljača camps, commander-adjutant Radoje Krasić, commander-adjutant Jovan Tasunović and cheta-leader Sima Damjanović. The lithograph was most likely done after a photograph dated 22 July 1876 in Dobrič.

== Historiography ==
In 1887 his approach to historiography was challenged and debated by Ilarion Ruvarac and Ljubomir Kovačević and eventually proved erroneous through critical methods, though his opus is not completely abandoned. He travelled to the Kosovo and Metohija region from 1871 to 1877 and left three volumes of data and maps which testify that Serbs were the majority and Albanians the minority population. His demographic-statistical structure matched an independent census taken by the Austrian authorities at about the same time.

== Works ==
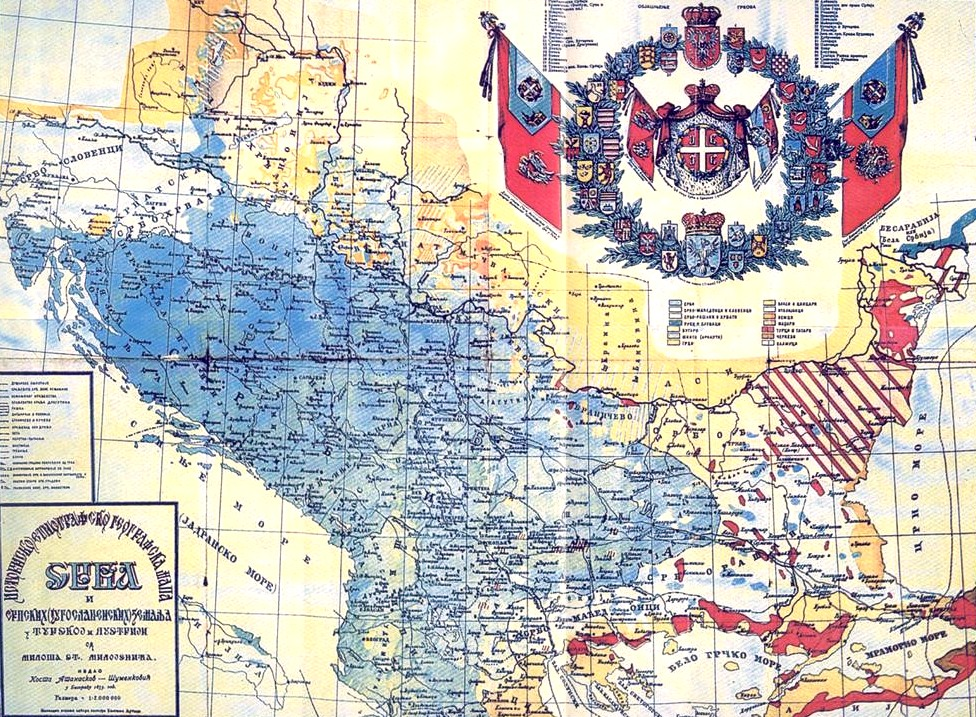
Milojević's historical, ethnographical and geographical map of Serbs and Serbian (Yugoslav) lands in Turkey and Austria. The map included not only today Bulgaria, but also present day Albania, Macedonia and Northern Greece. Because of his ideas about Greater Serbia, he is also known as Mad Milosh in Bulgaria.

- Odlomci istorije Srba i srpskih - jugoslavenskih - zemalja u Turskoj i Austriji, Beograd, 1872.
- Pesme i običaji ukupnog naroda srpskog
- Putopisi dela prave - Stare Srbije
- Naši manastiri i kaluđerstvo
- Prva dečanska hrisovulja
- Druga dečanska hrisovulja

=== Translations from Russian ===
- Običaji velikorusa
- Maljuta Skuratov (in two volumes)

=== Manuscripts ===
- Putopise (in nine segments)
- Četvrta knjiga pesama i običaja
- Nemanjića
- Prizrenska tapija
- Pravila svete Petke paraskeve srpske
- Pravila svetom Simenu srpskom
- Opšti list iz Patrijaršije Pećske
- Odgovor na izmišljotine u 10 i 12 broju Budućnosti, pod imenom: Naša agitacija na istok

== See also ==
- Jovan Hadži-Vasiljević
- Vladan Đorđević
- Ami Boué
- Alexander Hilferding

== Sources ==
- Cvetković, Sonja C. (2019). "СИНЕСТЕЗИЈА ВИЗУЕЛНОГ И МУЗИЧКОГ – ВИЋЕНТИЈЕ ПЕТРИК: МАРШ МИЛОША С. МИЛОЈЕВИЋА". Баштина (48). Приштина–Лепосавић.
- Dečanac, Sava (2001). Stradanje Stare Srbije i Makedonije. Dom kulture Sveti Dava. ISBN 978-86-83629-02-2.
- Grujić, Sava (1902). Operacije Timočko-Moravske vojske: Srpsko-Turski rat 1876-77 god : beleške i uspomene. Štamp. radionica vojnoga ministarstva.
- Jagodić, Miloš (2011). "Планови o политици Србије према Старој Србији и Македонији (1878-1885)". Историјски часопис. 60: 435–460 – via CEEOL.
- Lilić, Borislava (2015). "ОСЛОБОЂЕЊЕ НИША У ДРУГОМ СРПСКО-ТУРСКОМ РАТУ 1877/78. У СПИСИМА САВРЕМЕНИКА" (PDF). Zbornik. 13. Niš: Narodni muzej Niš: 155–172.
- Milošević, Zoran (2021). "Miloš S. Milojević i istorija srpskog nestajanja": 9–40.
- Popović, Z. R. (1899). "Miloš S. Milojević". Bratstvo. 8: 379–400.
- Riđanin, Ratko R. Marković (2017). "Miloš S. Milojević as a Historian and Liberation Propagandist". Stephanos. 1: 41–59. doi:10.24249/2309-9917-2017-21-1-41-59.
- Stanković, Todor P. (1910). Putne beleške po staroj Srbiji, 1871-1898. Stamparija D. Muncá i M. Karića.
- Stojančević, Vladimir (1998). Српски народ у Старој Србији у Великој источној кризи: 1876-1878. SANU. ISBN 86-355-0390-2.
- Vemić, Mirčeta (2005). Етничка карта дела Старе Србије: Према путопису Милоша С. Милојевића 1871–1877. год. Geografski institut „Jovan Cvijić“ SANU. pp. 16–. ISBN 978-86-80029-29-0.
- Vojvodić, Vaso (1994). U duhu Garašaninovih ideja: Srbija i neoslobođeno Srpstvo: 1868-1876. Prosveta. ISBN 978-86-07-00765-3.
- Vučetić, Biljana (2012). Наша ствар у Османском царству [Our Issue in the Ottoman Empire]. Istorijski institut. ISBN 978-86-7743-095-5.
- Ибарска војска у српско-турским ратовима од 1876. до 1878. године: научни скуп поводом обележавања 120-годишњице Јаворског рата: септембар 1996. Narodni muzej. 1997.
- Коло српских сестара (1938). "Вардар". Вардар. Коло српскикх сестара: 59–64.
