= Šiška =

Šiška is a place name that may refer to:

- Šiška District, a district of the city of Ljubljana, Slovenia
- Spodnja Šiška, a former village annexed by the city of Ljubljana, Slovenia
- Zgornja Šiška, a former village annexed by the city of Ljubljana, Slovenia
- Šiška, a pig breed
- Misspelling for Šišká, Sami spelling for Sjisjka, Sweden
