= Coat of arms of Triballia =

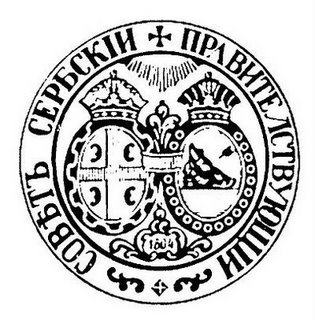
Government seal during the First Serbian Uprising (1805–1813)

The coat of arms of Triballia is a historical coat of arms attributed to medieval Serbia by various armorials, and is today depicted in several Serbian municipality coat of arms in Šumadija. The motif is of a severed (erased) wild boar's head with an arrow pierced in its mouth or through its head.

Prior to the 19th century the depiction was used for Serbia in armorials but not by the Serbs themselves; it was in use by the Hungarian kings with pretensions over Serbia. In the Habsburg Monarchy, the Flag of Serbia (Latin: Vexillum Serviae) with this depiction was one of the flags given to an honorary flag-bearer during the coronation of the King of Hungary, since 1563. In the Chronicle of the Council of Constance of Ulrich Richental from 1415, during the reign of Serbian Despot Stefan Lazarević, the motif is used as the coat of arms for the Serbian Empire. Conrad Grünenberg used it for "Serbia" in 1483. It was used to depict historical Serbia in numerous armorials dating between the 15th and 18th centuries, alongside the white double-headed eagle and cross with four firesteels. It was not used in any of the Illyrian Armorials.

The coat of arms of Serbia (a cross with four firesteels) and "Trivalija" (a boar head pierced with an arrow, denoting Šumadija) were included in the coat of arms of the Governing Council of Revolutionary Serbia upon its establishment in 1805. The usage of the name Triballia with this depiction comes from the Stemmatografia (1701) of Ritter-Vitezović who claimed that "Hungarian kings used the old symbol of Triballians for the kingdoms of Serbia and Rascia, and the seat of the Triballians was in Serbia", and was popularized through the later edition of Stemmatografia of Hristofor Žefarović (1741). The Triballi were an ancient tribe whose name was used as an exonym for the Serbs by archaizing Byzantine authors in the Middle Ages. Jovan Vladimir (r. 1000-16) was called the ruler of "Triballians and Serbs".

It is today used in several of the municipalities and cities of Šumadija in central Serbia, based on the usage in the Serbian Revolution (1804–17).

== Gallery ==
=== Historical ===
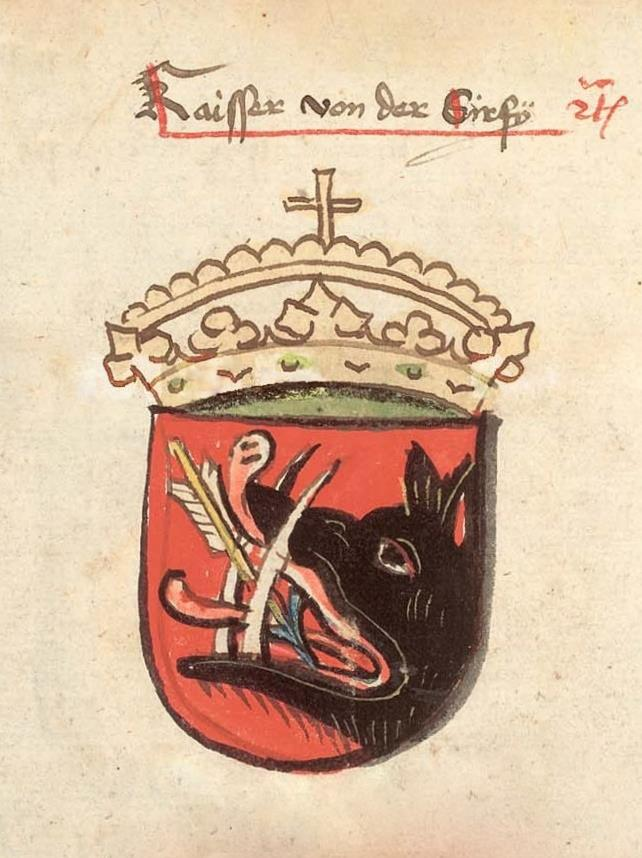
"Serbian emperor", Prussian ed. Chronicle of the Council of Constance (before 1437)

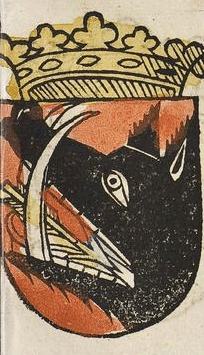
"Serbia", in later ed. Chronicle of the Council of Constance (1483)

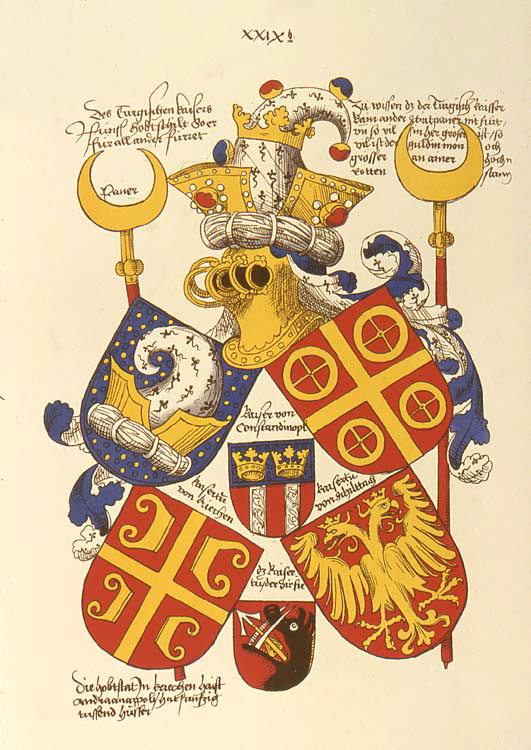
Coats of arms of the Turkish Empire, Constantinople, Palaeologus, Byzantium and Serbia (1483), Conrad Grünenberg.

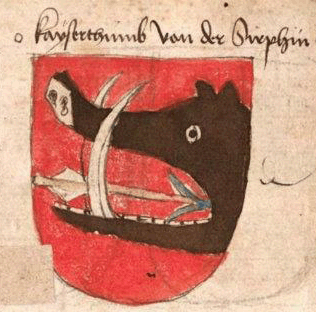
"Serbia", Wernigeroder Schaffhausensches Wappenbuch (between 1486 and 1492)

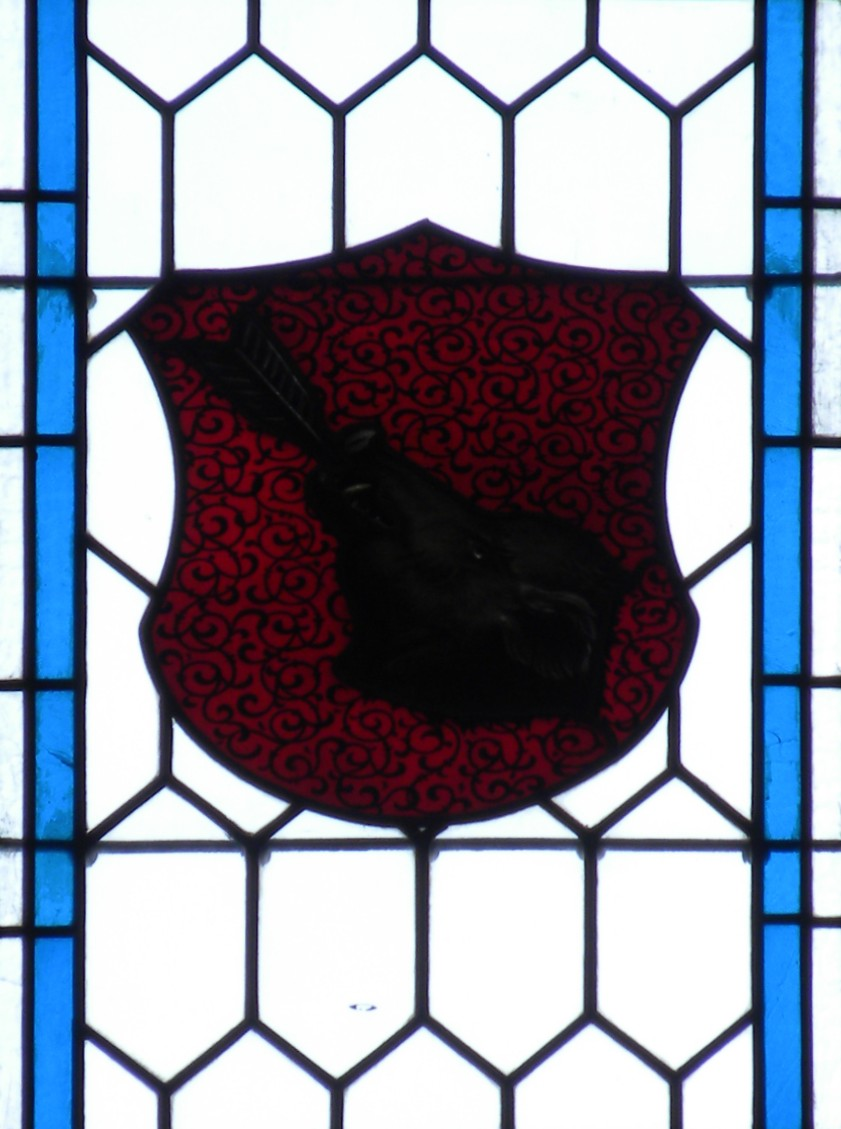
"Serbia" coat of arms, Cathedral of St. Elizabeth (built between 1378 and 1508)

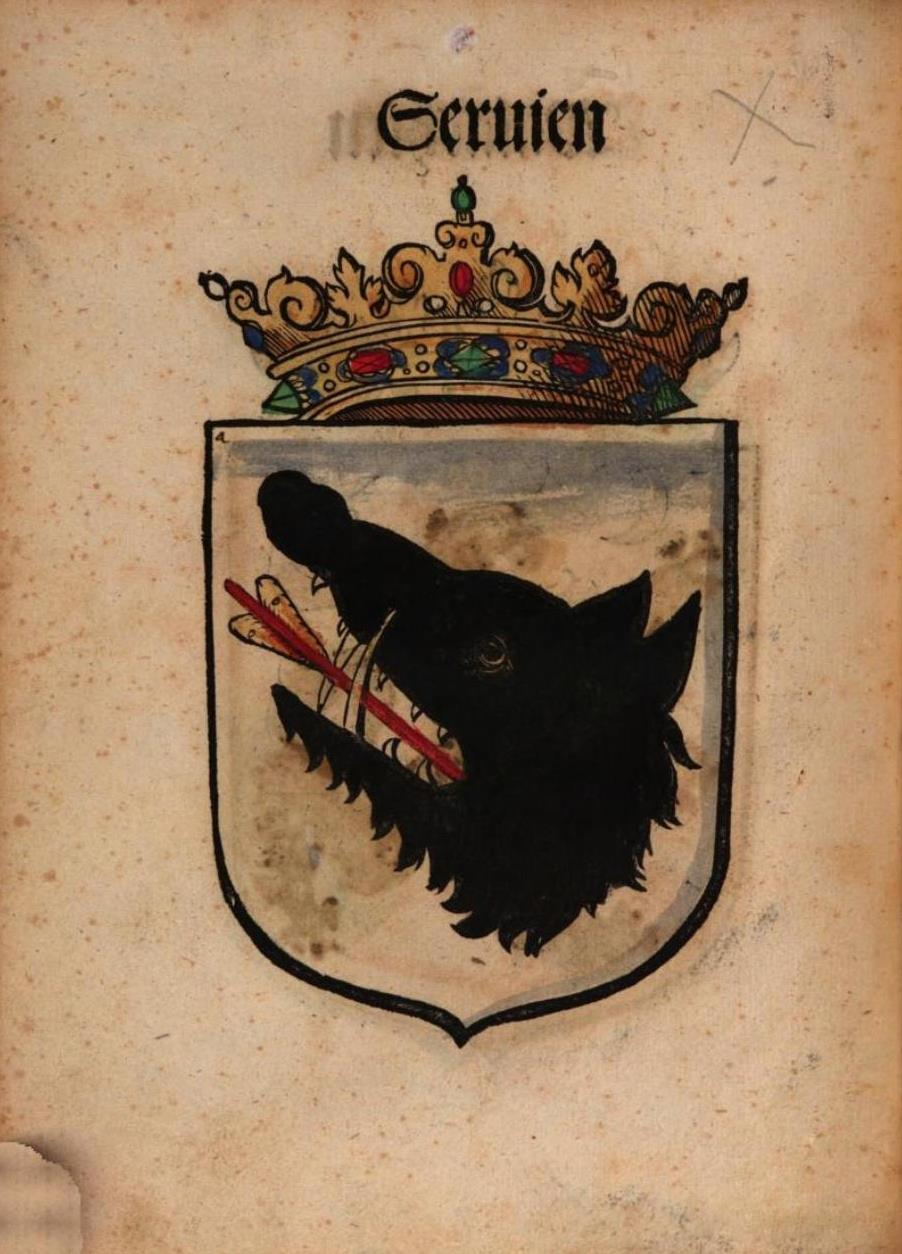
"Serbia", by Johann von Francolin (ca. 1565)

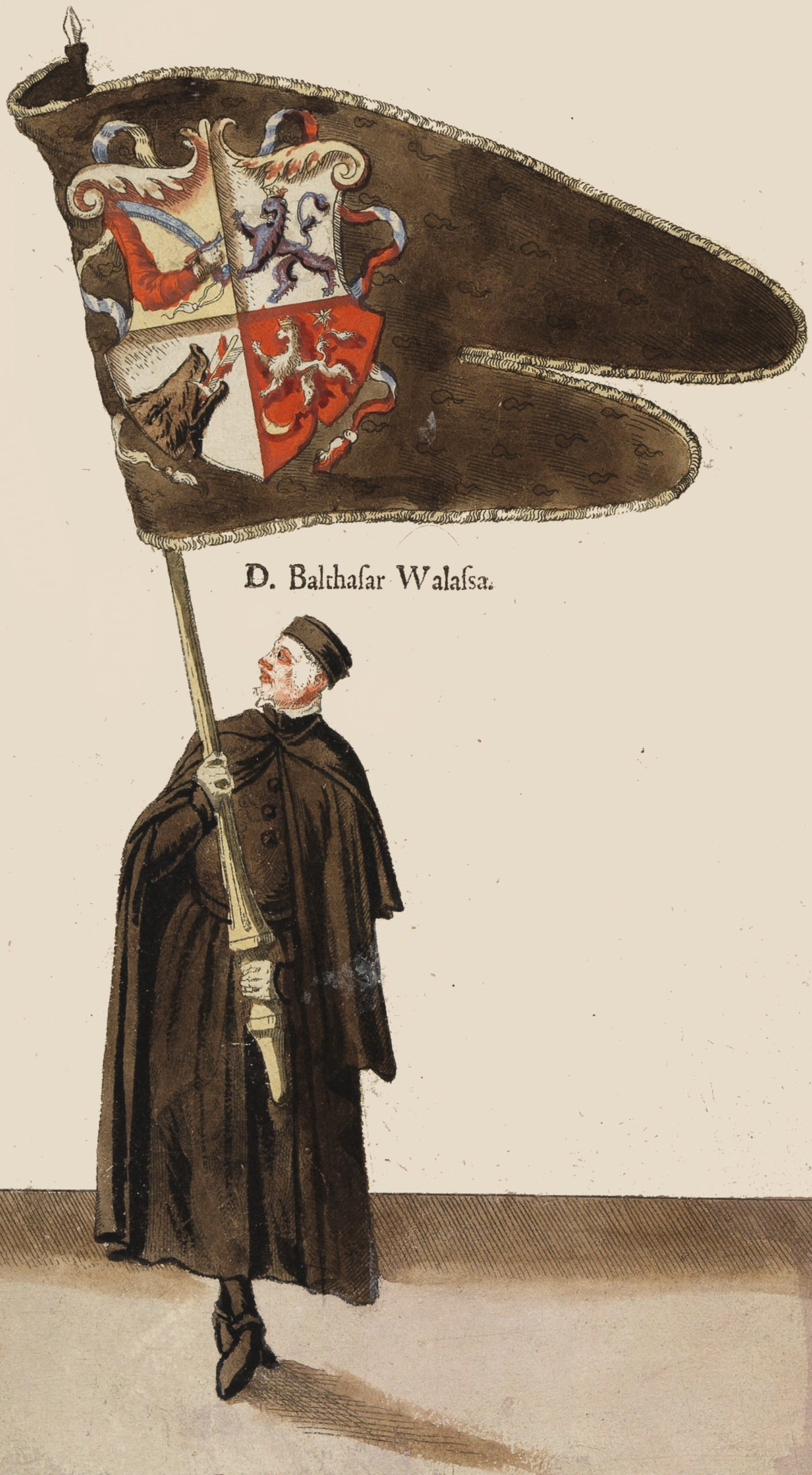
Banner of Bosnia–Serbia–Bulgaria–Wallachia at the funeral of Ferdinand I (1566)

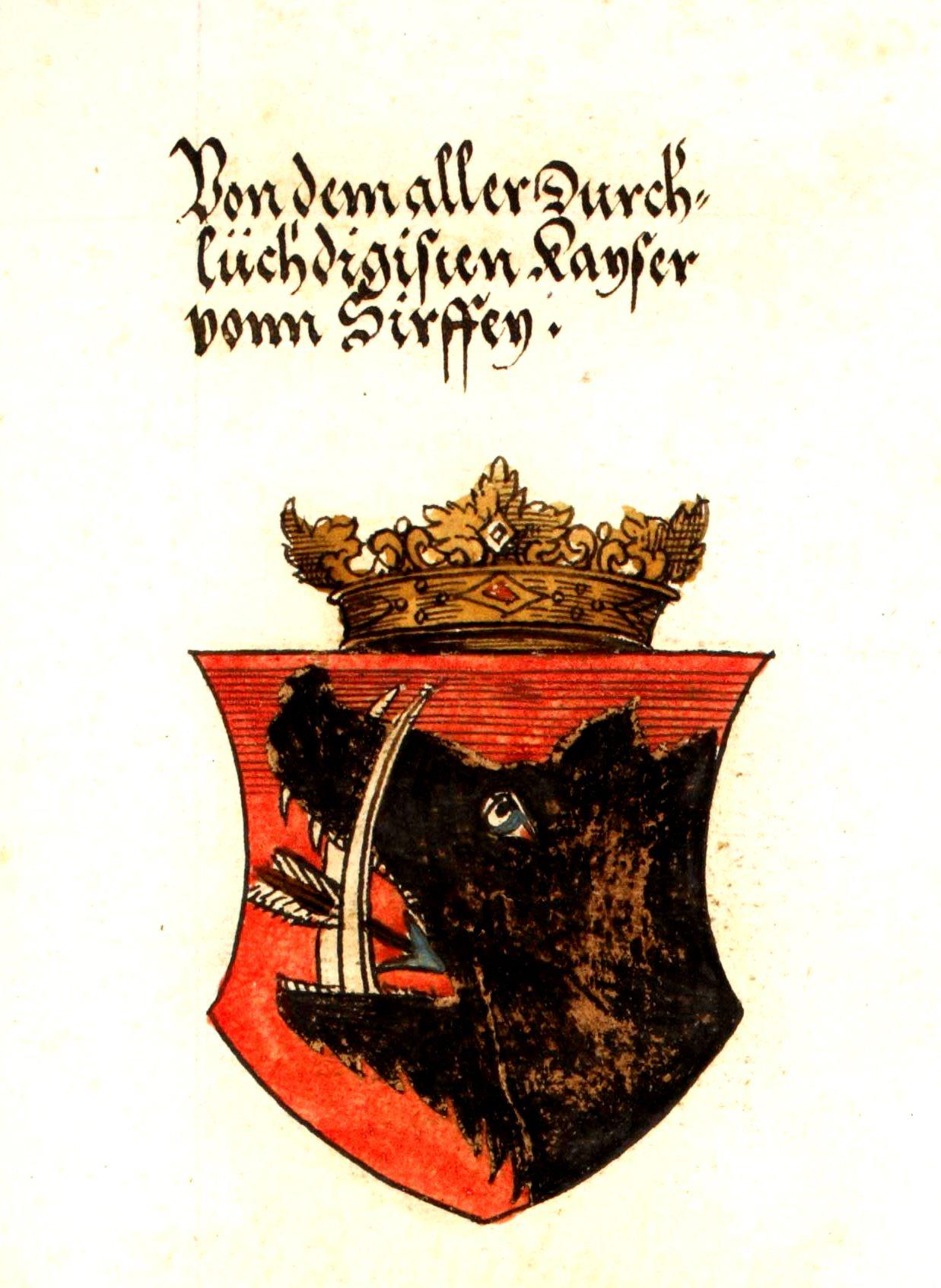
"Serbian emperor", by Christoph Silberysen (1576)

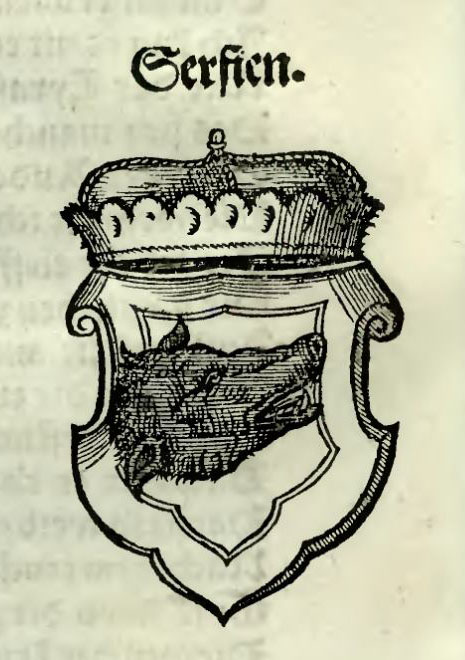
"Serbia", by Martin Schrott (ca. 1580)

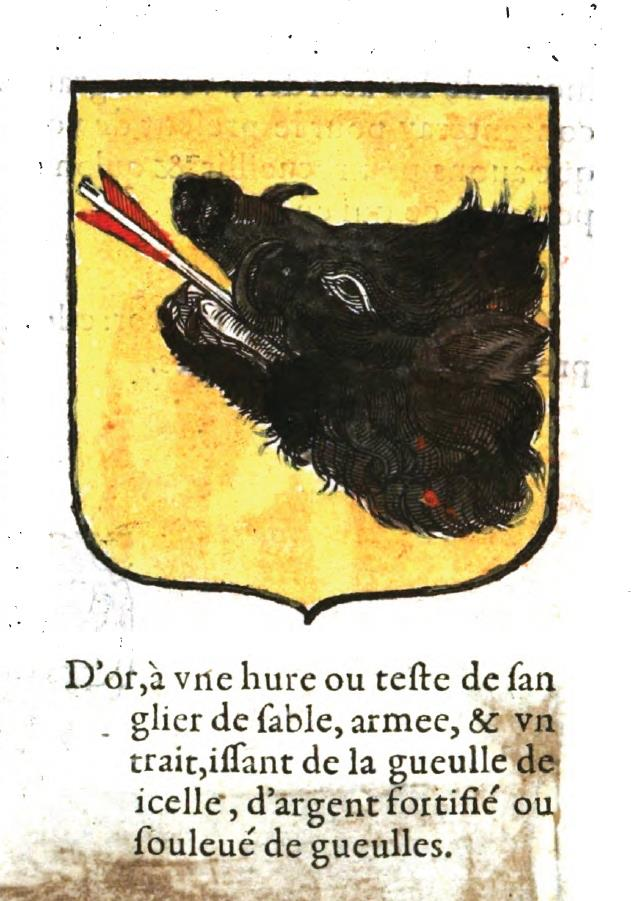
Unnamed, by Jerome de Bar (1604)

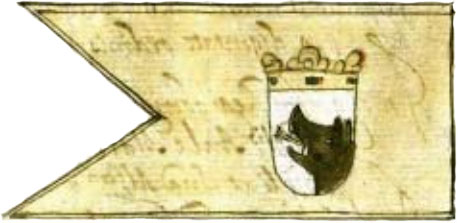
Sketch of flag of Serbia used at the coronation of Ferdinand II (1618)

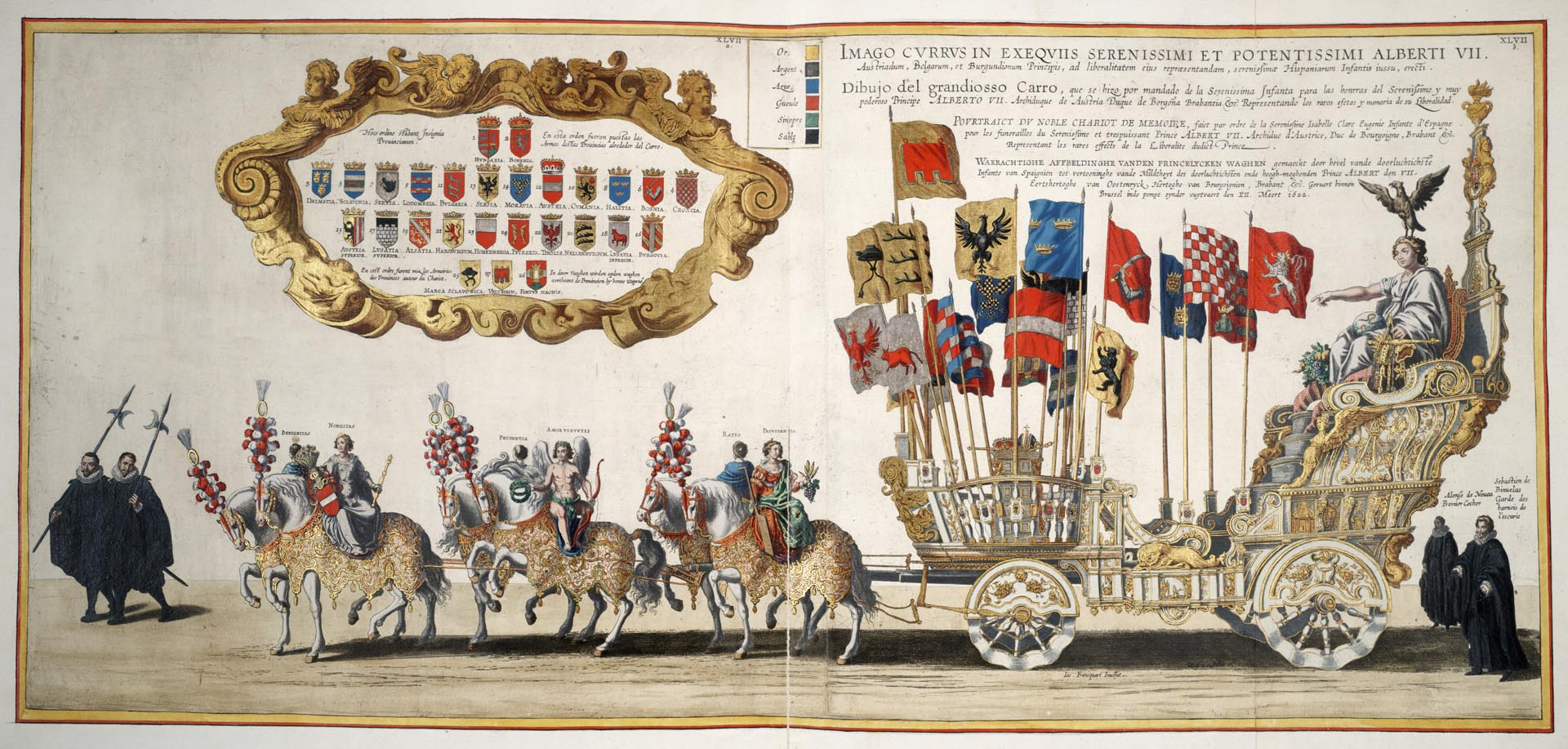
Funeral procession for Albert VII, Archduke of Austria with the coat of arms of Kingdom of Serbia (1623)

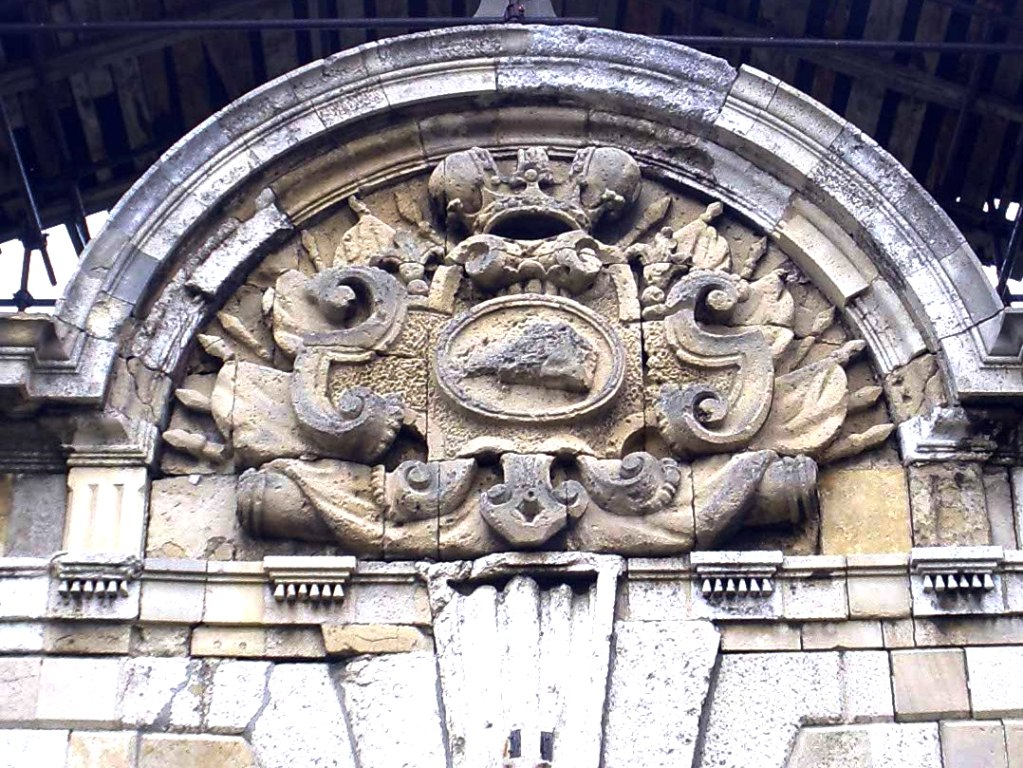
Coat of arms of Kingdom of Serbia at Belgrade fortress (1717)

Coat of arms of the Kingdom of Serbia (1720)

Coat of arms of the Kingdom of Serbia

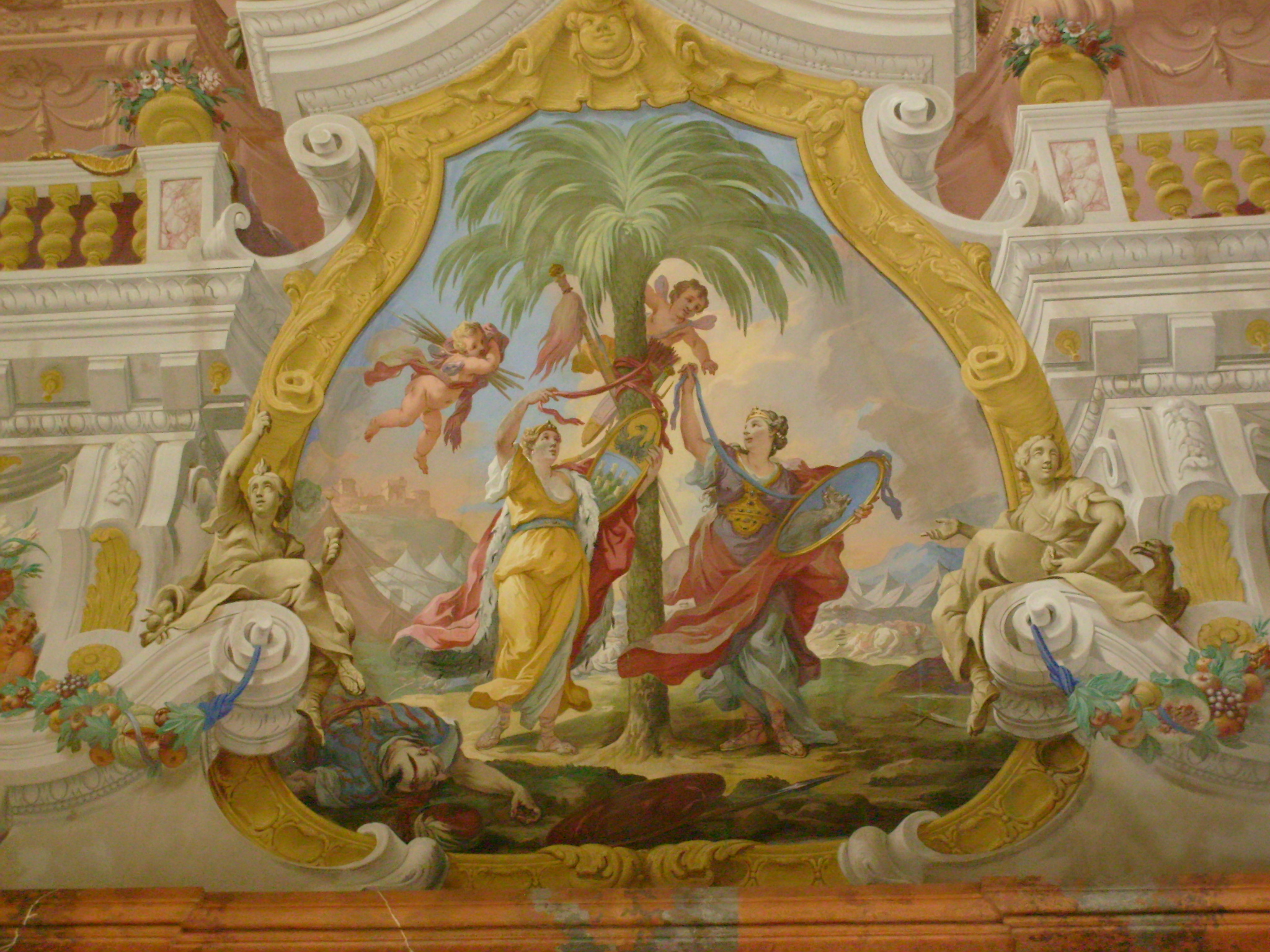
"Allegorical representation of Transylvania and Serbia" (1723), Altomonte

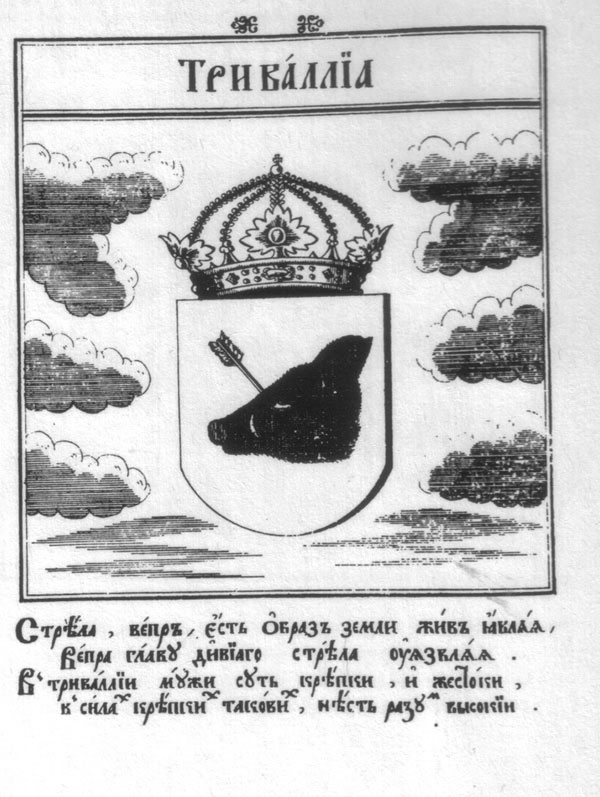
"Triballia" coat of arms, Stemmatographia (1741)

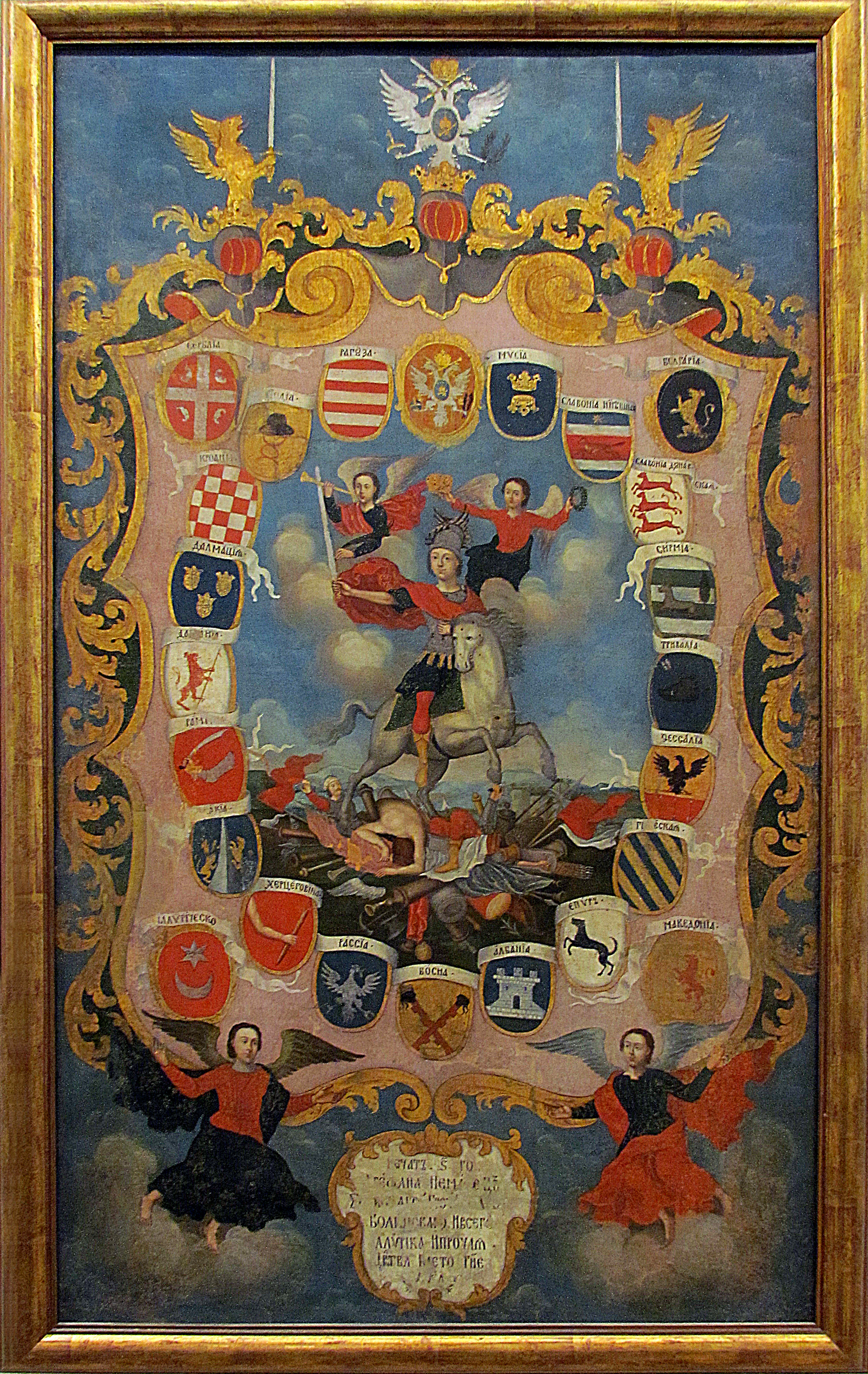
Emperor Dušan with coats of arms of Serbian lands (ca. 1750), Jov Vasiljevič, National Museum of Serbia

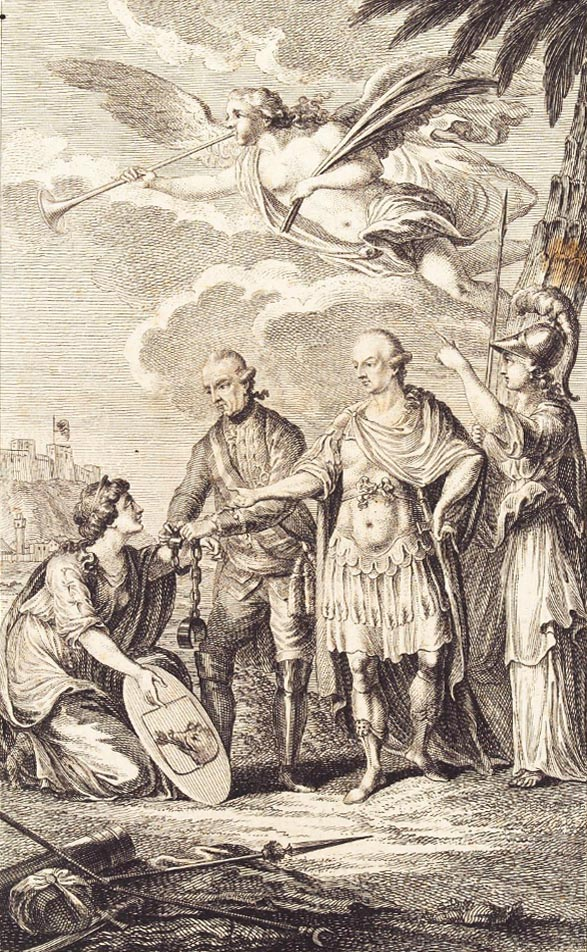
"Liberated Serbia" (1800s), Johann Georg Mansfeld

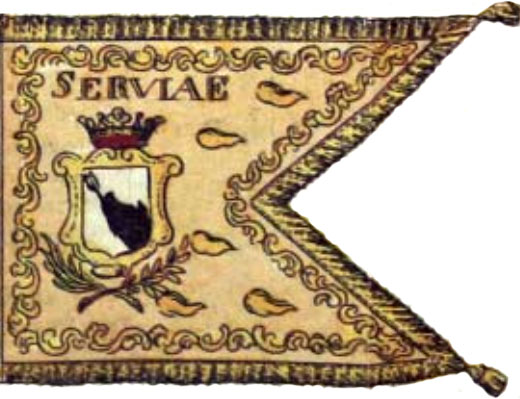
Sketch of "flag of Serbia" used at the coronation of Leopold II (1790)

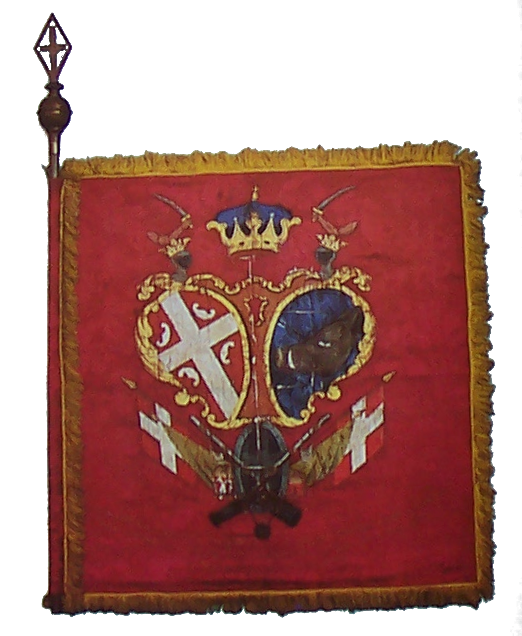
Serbian uprising flag with the coat of arms (1804), Belgrade Military Museum

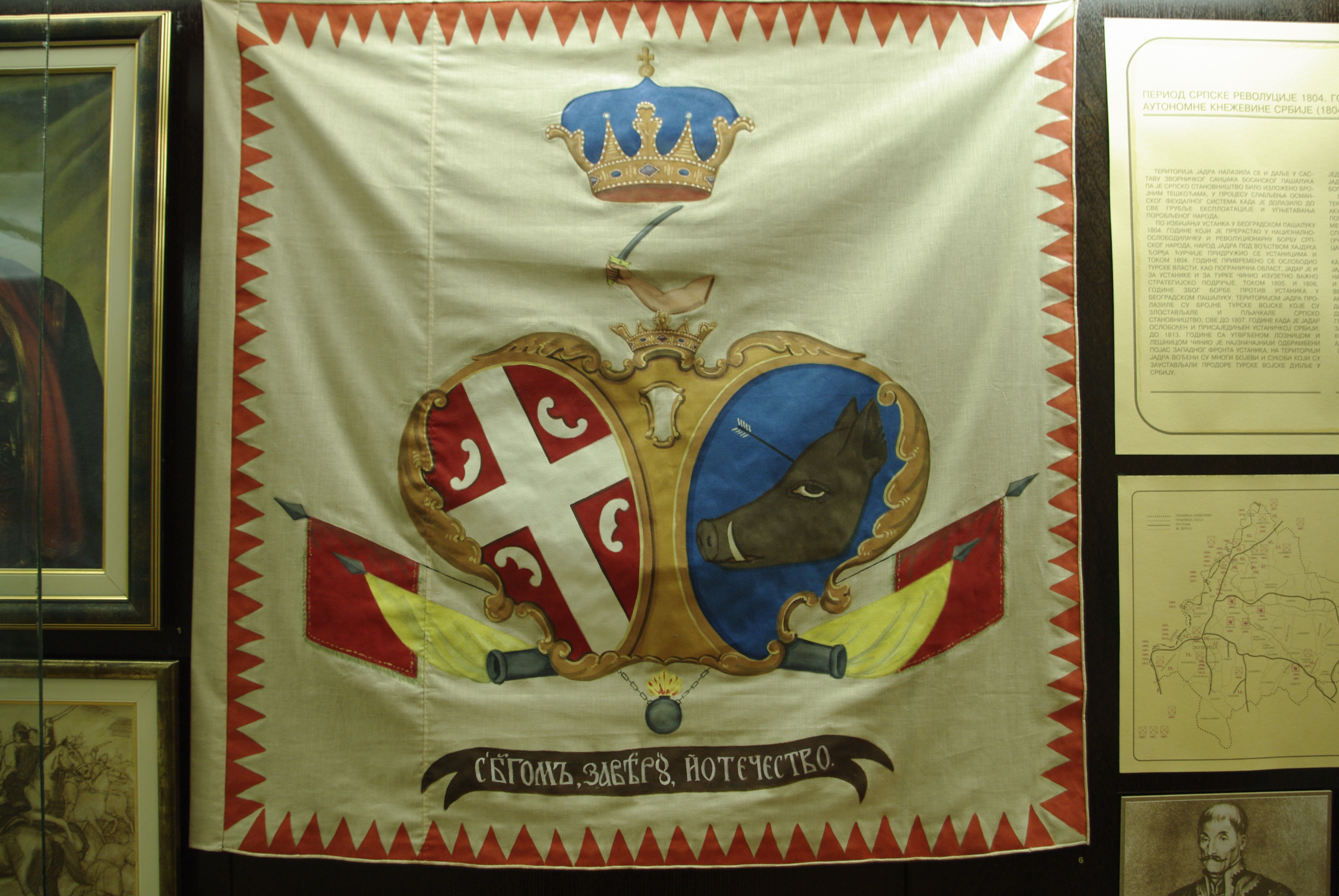
Serbian uprising flag with the coat of arms (1804), Loznica

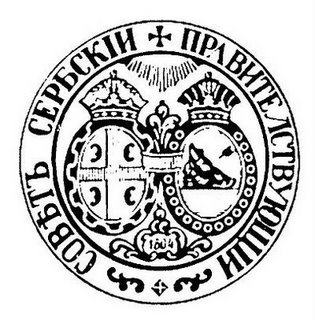
Government seal during the First Serbian Uprising (1804)

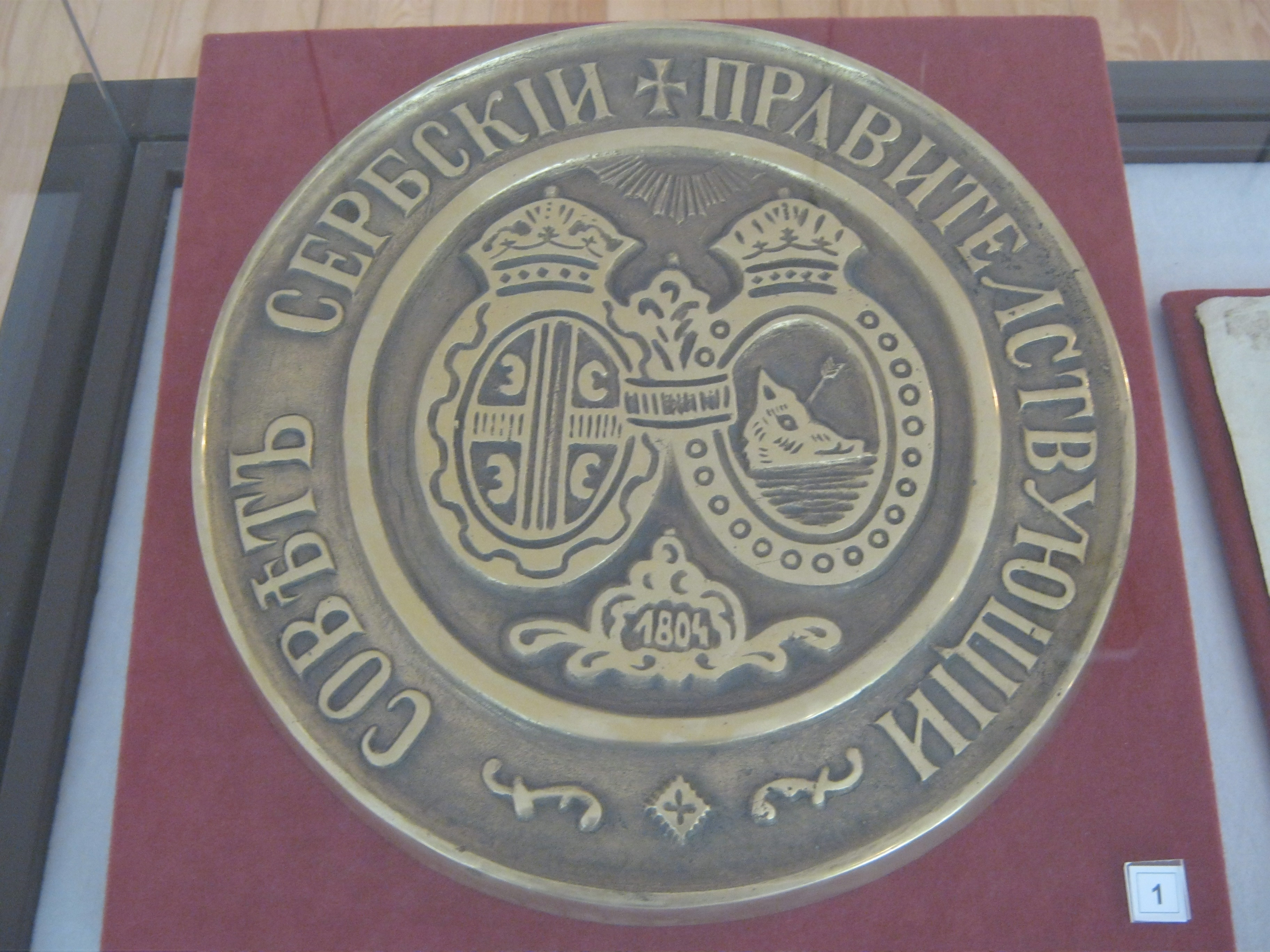
Government seal during the First Serbian Uprising (1804), Takovo

Coat of arms of Kingdom of Serbia in the coat of arms of Hungary (1849)

=== Current ===
==== Municipalities in Serbia ====
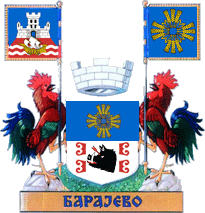
Greater coat of arms of Barajevo

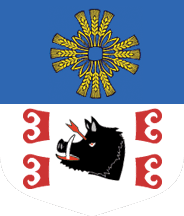
Lesser coat of arms of Barajevo

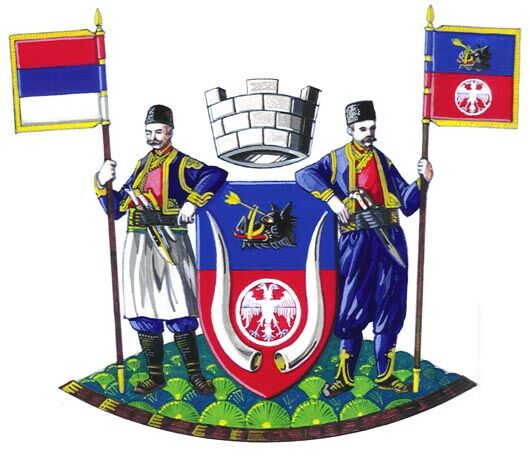
Greater coat of arms of Velika Plana

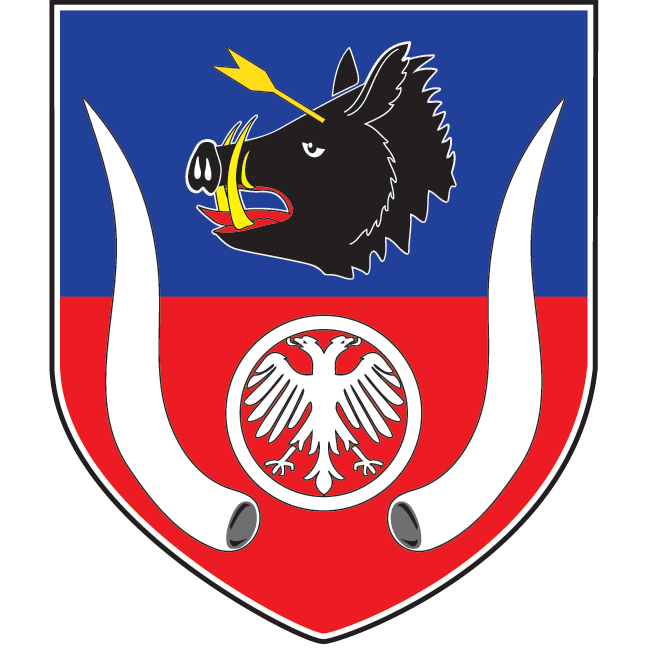
Lesser coat of arms of Velika Plana

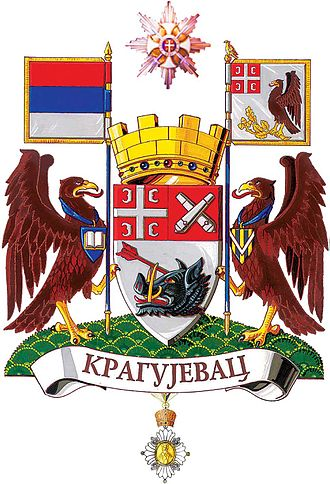
Greater coat of arms of Kragujevac

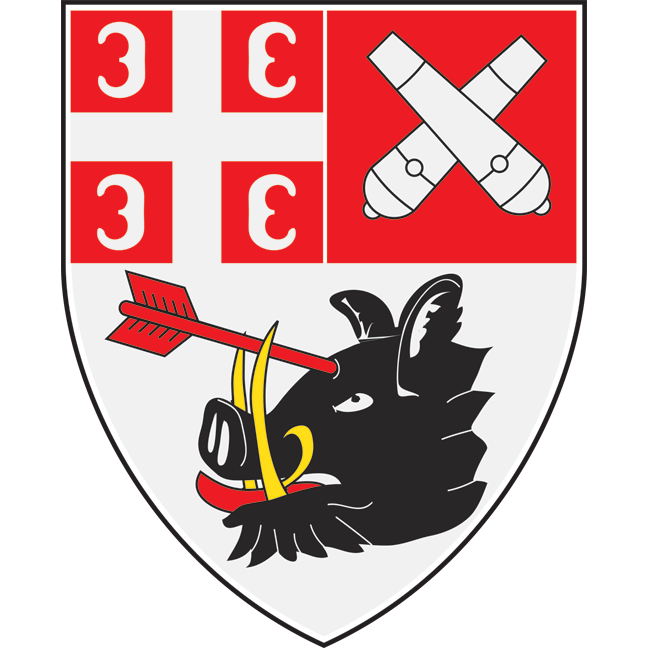
Lesser coat of arms of Kragujevac

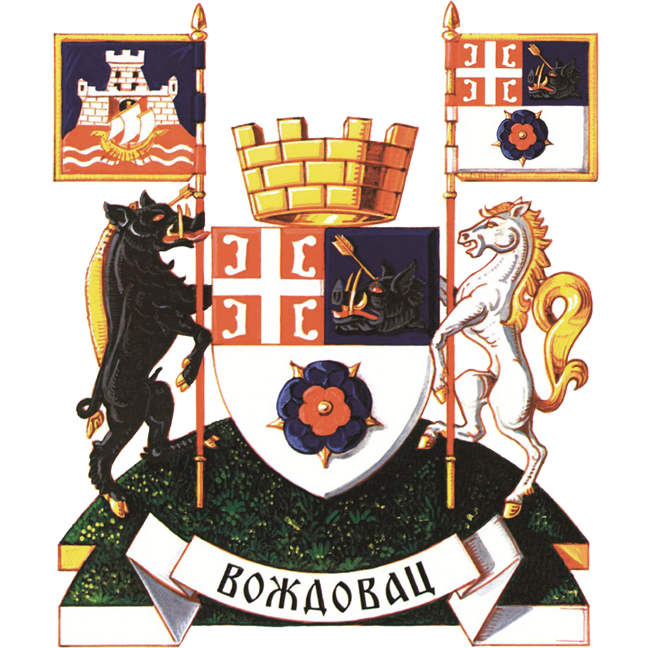
Greater coat of arms of Voždovac

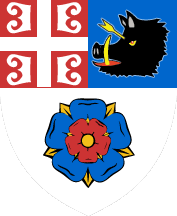
Lesser coat of arms of Voždovac

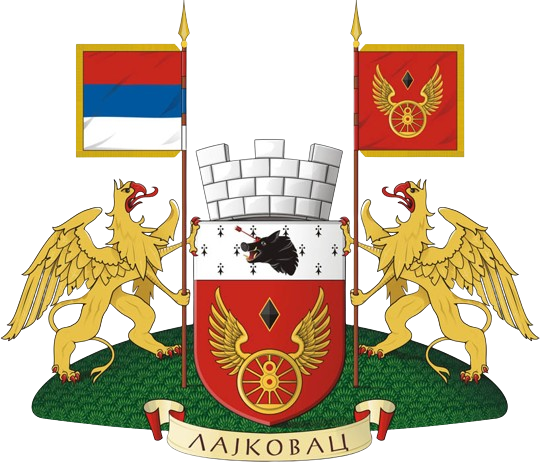
Greater coat of arms of Lajkovac

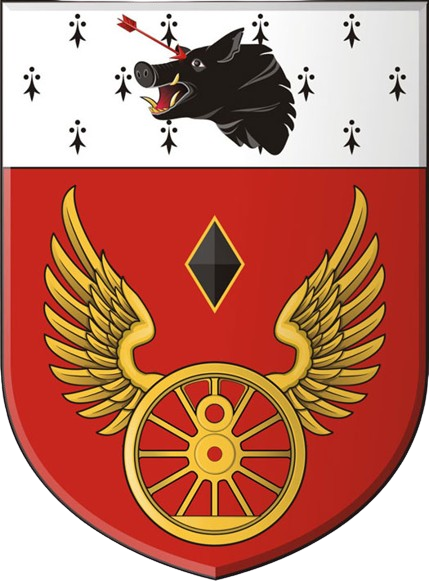
Lesser coat of arms of Lajkovac

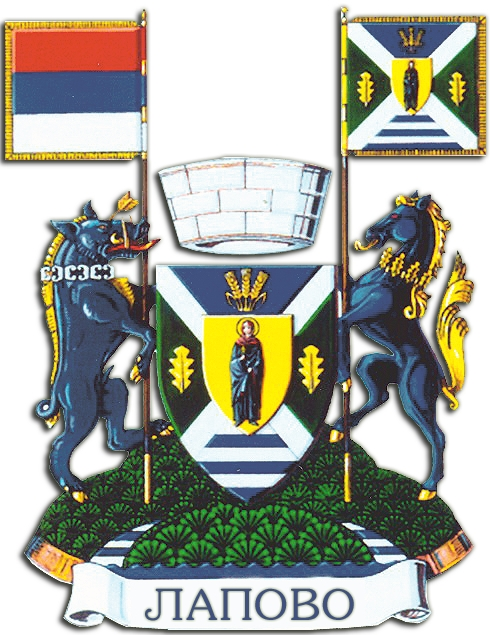
Greater coat of arms of Lapovo

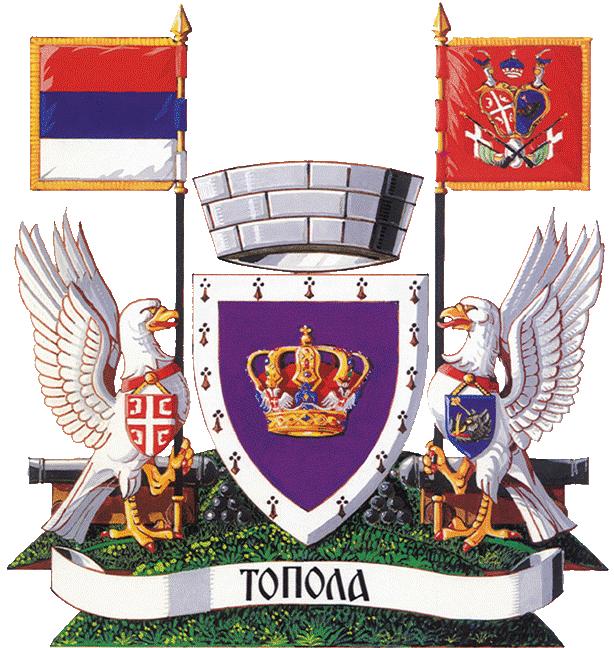
Greater coat of arms of Topola

== See also ==
- Coat of arms of Serbia
- Armorial of Serbia

== Annotations ==
1. Known as Serbian: грб Трибалије, romanized: grb Tribalije, or in archaic form грб Тривалије grb Trivalije, based on Ritter-Vitezović (1701). Also called the coat of arms of Šumadija in modern times. It was used in the "Flag of Serbia" (Latin: Vexillum Serviae) by the Habsburg Monarchy.
2. At the time of the First Serbian Uprising, there was a native half-primitive breed of Šiška pig which resembled a wild boar. Several of the Serbian revolutionaries were pig traders prior to the uprising and merchants played an important role in it.
