= Flag of Serbia (Habsburg) =

Historical flag of Serbia

The Habsburg Kings of Hungary were titular rulers (claimants) of Serbia, through the historical vassalage of the Serbian Despotate to the Kingdom of Hungary. The Serbian Despotate was finally conquered by the Ottoman Empire in 1459, while "Little Rascia" (in the Kingdom of Hungary) in 1521–40. The Vexillum Serviae (in Latin, "flag of Serbia"; Hungarian: Rácország zászlója, Szervia zászlója) was one of the flags given to an honorary flag-bearer during the coronation of the king, since 1563. Central Serbia was at times occupied by the Habsburg Monarchy as the "Kingdom of Serbia". The flag included the Triballian boar.

Flag used at the coronation of Ferdinand II (1618).

Flag used at the coronation of Leopold II (1790).

== Flag-bearers ==
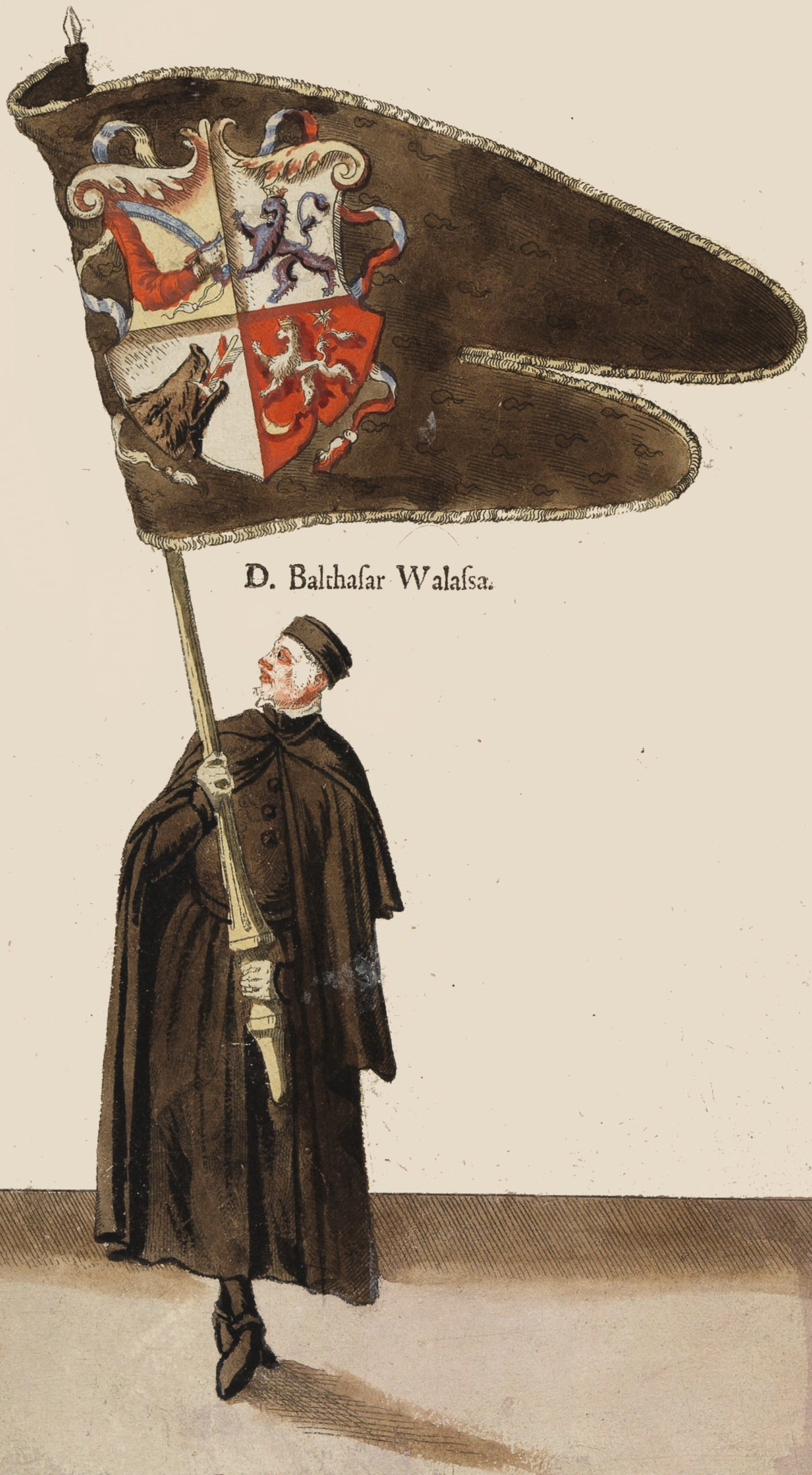
Boldizsár Balassa with banner of Bosnia–Serbia–Bulgaria–Wallachia at the funeral of Ferdinand I, 1564.

- László Kerecsényi, under Maxilian II (r. HRE 1564–76), when crowned King of Hungary on 8 September 1563. According to Johann Listh, comes Thersaczky was the flag-bearer of Serbia, while Kerecsényi was that of Sclavonia.
- György Homonnai-Drugeth (Georgius Homonnay), under Rudolf II (r. HRE 1576–1612), when crowned King of Hungary on 25 September 1572.
- Péter Révay (Petrus Réway), under Matthias (r. HRE 1612–19), when crowned King of Hungary on 19 November 1609.
- György Zrínyi (Georgius Zrinio), under Ferdinand II (r. HRE 1619–37), when crowned King of Hungary on 1 July 1618.
- Dániel Esterházy, under Ferdinand III (r. HRE 1637–57), when crowned King of Hungary on 8 December 1625.
- László Forgách, under Ferdinand IV, when crowned King of Hungary on 16 June 1647.
- Pál Esterházy, under Leopold I (r. HRE 1658–1705), when crowned King of Hungary on 27 June 1655. The Habsburgs occupied central Serbia in 1686–91.
- Adam von Kollonitsch, under Joseph I (r. HRE 1705–11), when crowned King of Hungary on 9 December 1687.
- Péter Andrássy, under Charles IV (r. HRE 1711–40), when crowned King of Hungary on 22 May 1712. The Habsburgs occupied central Serbia in 1718–39.
- ?, under Leopold II (r. HRE 1790–92). The Habsburgs occupied central Serbia in 1788–92.

== See also ==
- List of Serbian flags

== Sources ==
- Martinus Georgius Kovachich, ed. (1790). Solennia Inauguralia Serenissimorum Ac Potentissimorum Principum Utriusque Sexus, Qui Ex Augusta Stirpe Habspurgo-Austriaca Sacro Corona Apostolica In Regis Hungarorum, Reginasque Periodo Tertia Redimiti Sunt. Pest: typis Matthiæ Trattner. (in Latin)
- Pálffy, Géza (2011). "Korunovačné zástavy krajín Uhorskej koruny od neskorého stredoveku do začiatku 20. storočia" (PDF). Galéria (in Slovak). Bratislava: 7–30.
- Pálffy, Géza (2010). "A Magyar Korona országainak koronázási zászlói a 16–17. században". In Bubryák, Orsolya (ed.). "Ez világ, mint egy kert…" (in Hungarian). MTA Művészettörténeti Kutatóintézet–Gondolat Kiadó. pp. 17–52.
- Pavlowitch, Stevan K. (2002). Serbia: The History behind the Name. London: Hurst & Company. ISBN 9781850654773.
