= Sjisjka =

Locality in Kiruna Municipality, Sweden

Coordinates: 67°37′00″N 20°14′0″E

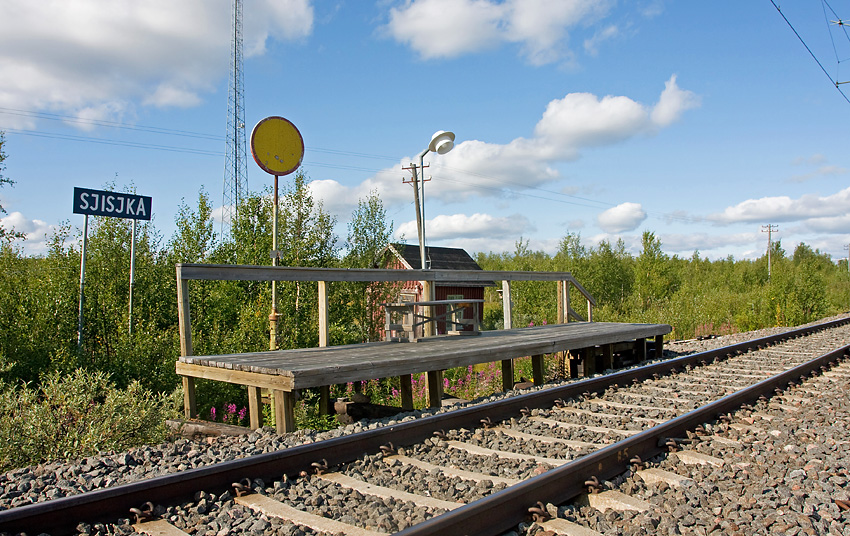
Sjisjka Station

Sjisjka, (Swedish) also spelt Sjiska or Šišká (North Sami), is a locality in Gällivare Municipality, Sweden. It has a railway station on the Iron Ore Line 20 km south of Kiruna, between Kalixforsbron and Kaitum. The hamlet has eight buildings.

== Nature reserve ==
Taking the train to Sjisjka is the only way to enter the Kaitum Fjällurskog Nature Reserve apart from hiking or skiing. A footpath leads west from Sjisjka to Tjåurek and from there one can go on to Nikkaluokta, Laukkuluspa, Holmajärvi, Liettik or to Kaitum, which is slightly south of Sjisjka at the railway. There is no road to the railway station or the village. The nearest roads are in Kaitum and Kalixforsbron, each about 10 km away. About 11 km west of Sjisjka railway stop is the Sjisjka-ape mire (also spelt Šiškká-ahpi). A hill with the same name as the railway stop is situated between the mire and the railway station.

== History ==
Sjisjka was the place where Sami artist Nils Nilsson Skum lived. Among the reasons that the Swedish State Railways built a railway stop there was that the artist lived there. The lack of a road created a need for train access. Another reason was that it was the only place where the railway's initials, SJ, occur twice in the place's name.

== Rail traffic ==
In recent years, the operator Norrtåg has taken over the service between Luleå/Boden and Kiruna from SJ. Only two trains a day stop at the station, one in the morning going south towards Boden and one in the evening going north towards Kiruna.

== Wind park ==
In 2004, the energy company Vindkompaniet i Kiruna (wind company in Kiruna) filed a request to build 30 wind turbines on the Sjisjka hill near the railway stop.

The company Vindkompaniet i Kiruna wants to build windmills on a hill immediately west of Sjisjka. Originally, the plan was to build a road track from Kaitum to Sjisjka, parallel to the railway line, but this plan faced considerable criticism. In the new plan, the windmills are to be transported to Lappberg, and the length of the road is much smaller. This plan was approved by Miljödomstolen in 2007; the final decision to build it was taken in December 2007. They were built during 2012, and were opened for usage in October 2012

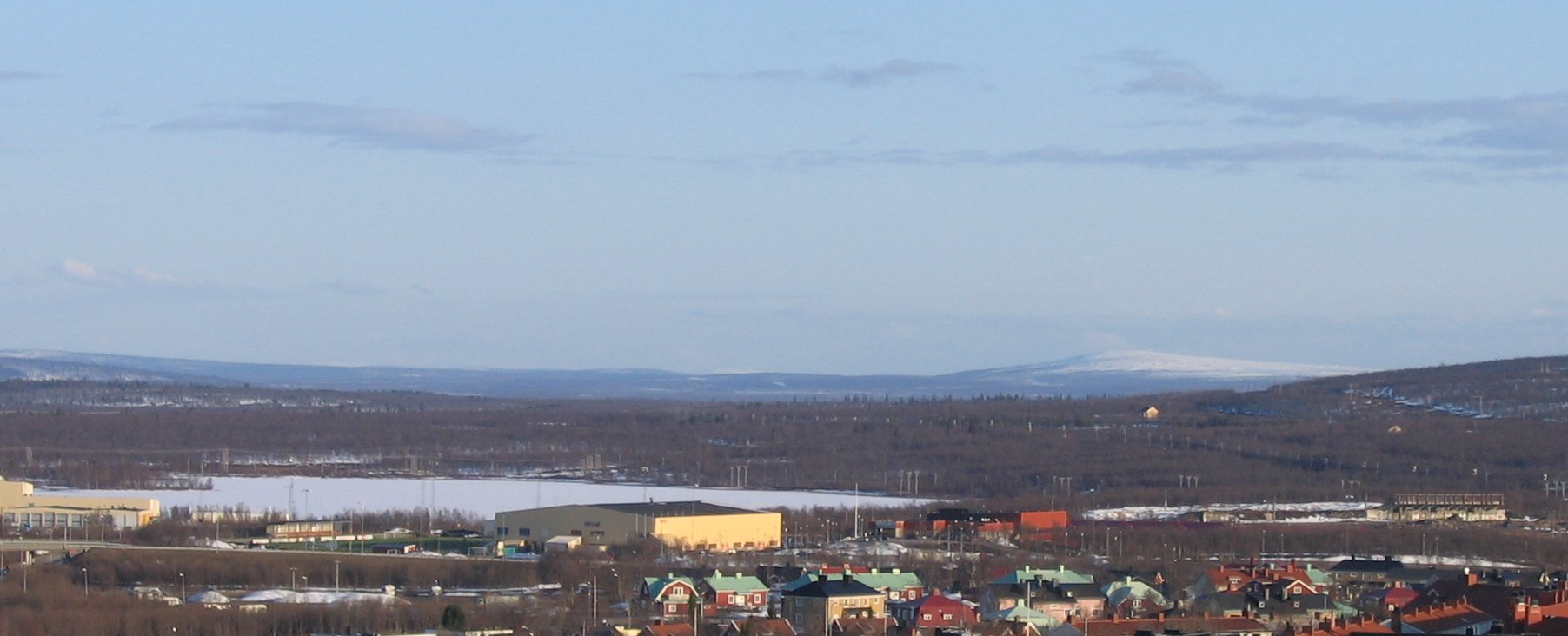
Šišká as seen from Kiruna. Šišká is the hill at the horizon on the right side of the photograph.
