= Géza Pálffy =

Hungarian historian, full professor (born 1971)

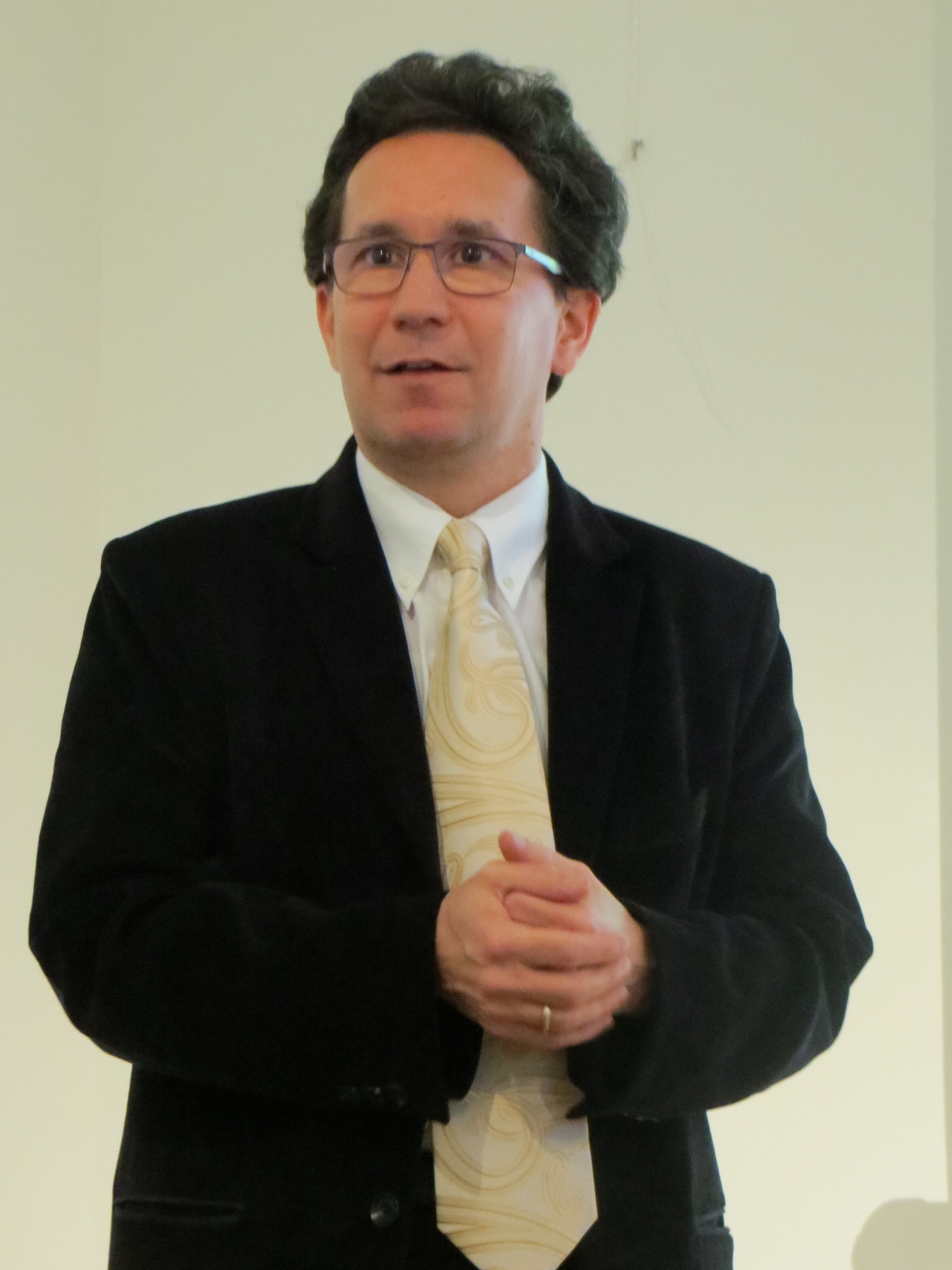
- Born: February 9, 1971 (age 55); Veszprém, Hungary
- Citizenship: Hungarian
- Education: Eötvös Loránd University (ELTE)
- Known for: Habsburg monarchy Coronation of the Hungarian monarch
- Spouse: dr. Magdolna Friedler
- Awards: Order of Merit of the Republic of Hungary, 2015
- Scientific career
- Fields: History of Ottoman-Hungarian relations
- Workplaces: Hungarian Academy of Sciences (HAS), Research Center for the Humanities Institute of History
- Website: official website in English

Géza Pálffy (Hungarian: [ˈɡeːzɒ ˈpaːlfi]; born 9 February 1971) is a Hungarian historian, full (university) professor. He has long been active in research of the relationship between the Habsburg monarchy and Kingdom of Hungary in the 16–17th centuries. He works as a scientist both in Hungary and around the world, and has published in several languages: English, German, Slovak, Croatian, Romanian, French, Russian, Italian, Czech, Turkish and Hungarian.

== Biography and career ==
He took M. A. degrees at the Eötvös Loránd University (ELTE), Faculty of Arts in History (1994) and archival studies in 1995.

During his academic years he also learned Turcology and Slavistics because he was interested in the history of Ottoman Empire, and its relations with Kingdom of Hungary.

He has been working at the Institute of History of Research Centre for the Humanities of Hungarian Academy of Sciences, Budapest since his graduation.

In 1999 he completed his PhD degree in History and then was awarded Doctor of Science (D.Sc.) degree in history in 2010.

He started as a research fellow and in 2002 he became a senior research fellow. He became a scientific adviser (Professor) and he acted as a Head of the Department of Early Modern History from 2011 until 2013. He lectured as a visiting professor at the University of Miskolc, Eötvös Loránd University, and at the University of Pécs. In 2012 he was appointed the leader of “Lendület” (“Momentum”) Holy Crown of Hungary Research Group. He has done research abroad, in Austria, Croatia, Czech Republic, Slovakia and Germany for several times.

His working papers were issued in both national and international research scientific journals, and circa 400 scientific articles and books were published in several languages: English, German, Slovak, Croatian, Rumanian, French, Russian, Italian, Czech, Turkish and Hungarian. He presents his talks at conferences and science forums. He has written and edited articles and monographs. He also works as a supervisor at numerous doctoral schools at Hungarian and international universities, and undertakes the role of a doctoral thesis opponent and in evaluation committees as a reviewer at the Hungarian Academy of Sciences.

He is married to Dr. Magdolna Friedler, who works as an organist.

== Committee memberships ==
- Member of the Gesellschaft für die Erforschung der Frühen Neuzeit, Wien, 1995–
- Member of the Arbeitskreis „Militär und Gesellschaft”, Berlin, 1996–
- Member of the Society of Castrum Bene, Budapest, 1998–
- Member of the Commission of History of the Hungarian Academy of Sciences, 2008–
- Member of the Foundation of Aktion Österreich-Ungarn, 2003–

=== Editorial board memberships ===
- Member of the Editorial Staff of Hadtörténelmi Közlemények [Journal of Military History, Budapest), 1999–
- Member of the Editorial Staff of Múlt-kor (Internet Journal of History), 2001–
- Member of the Editorial Staff of Zbornik Odsjeka za povijesne znanosti Zavoda za povijesne i društvene znanosti Hrvatske akademije znanosti i umjetnosti (Zagreb), 2002–
- Member of the Editorial Staff of Podravina: Časopis za multidisciplinarna istraživanja (Zagreb), 2002–
- Member of the Editorial Staff of Lymbus: Magyarságtudományi forrásközlemények (Lymbus: Sources in Hungarologhy, Budapest), 2002–2017
- Member of the Editorial Staff of Századok [Centuries, Budapest), 2003–2007
- Member of the editorial board of Századok, 2003–2012
- Member of the Editorial Staff of Ekonomska i ekohistorija: Časopis za gospodarsku povijest i povijest okoliša (Zagreb), 2005–
- Member of the Editorial Staff of Časopis Matice moravske (Brno), 2007–
- Member of the Editorial Staff of Radovi Zavoda za hrvstaku povijest (Faculty of Arts, University of Zagreb), 2011–

=== Carrier-related public activities ===
- Academic Advisor of Institute of Habsburg History, Budapest 2003–2009, 2011–
- Deputy-Secretary-General of the Hungarian Historical Society, 1999–2003
- President of the Foundation of Fons, 1995–1998

== Fields of interest ==
- History of the Kingdom of Hungary and the Central European Habsburg Monarchy from the 15th to the Beginning of the 18th Century
- with the special regard to the history of the defence system against the Ottomans in Hungary and Croatia (16th–17th centuries)
- to the Habsburg-Hungarian
- the Hungarian-Slovak and the Hungarian-Croatian relations
- to the political, military and social history of Central Europe in the early-modern age
- to the history of Habsburg Court in Vienna/Prague
- to thehistory of the Hungarian aristocracy and Hungarian coronation

== Awards and honors ==
- Order of Merit of the Republic of Hungary, 2015
- Magyar Kultúra Lovagja (Knight of Hungarian Culture), 2011
- Bálint Balassi Medal, 2004
- Talent Award, 2003
- Jenő Szűcs Prize (Open Society Foundations), 2001
- Bezerédj Scholarship, 2001
- Ferenc Szakály Medal, 2000
- Youth Prize (Hungarian Academy of Sciences), 1997
- Young Military Historian Award, 1996
- Pro Scientia Medal, 1993

== Works ==
=== Papers ===
- Pálffy, Géza: Ein vergessener Ausgleich in der Geschichte der Habsburgermonarchie des 17. Jahrhunderts: Der ungarische Krönungsreichstag in Ödenburg/Sopron, 1622. In: Adel und Religion in der frühneuzeitlichen Habsburgermonarchie. Annäherung an ein gesamtösterreichisches Thema. Hrsg. Katrin Keller–Petr Maťa–Martin Scheutz. Wien–Köln–Weimar : Böhlau, 2017. (Veröffentlichungen des Instituts für Österreichische Geschichtsforschung, 68.) 388 p., itt: p. 85–107.
- Pálffy, Géza–Ferenc Tóth: Les couronnements en Hongrie à l’époque moderne (1526–1792). Représentations et outils politico-diplomatiques. In: Revue d'histoire diplomatique, 131. (2017) Nr. 3., p. 253–276.
- Pálffy, Géza: 16. Yüzyıl Macaristan ve Hırvatistanı’nda Türk Tehdidine Karşı Müdafaa ve Askeri Haritacılık. In: Güney Doğu Avrupa Araştırmaları Dergisi / The Journal of South-Eastern European Studies, Istanbul, 24. (2013) [2017] Nr. 2., p. 17–47.
- Pálffy, Géza: Jahrhundert von Trennungen und Ausgleichen. Die Geschichte des Königreichs Ungarn im 17. Jahrhundert in einem neuen Licht. In: Historisches Jahrbuch, 137. (2017), p. 248–267.
- Pálffy, Géza: Век разрывов и компромиссов: новый взгляд на историю Венгерского королевства XVII вeкa. In: Cлaвянoвeдeниe / Slavyanovedenie, (2016) No. 2., p. 41–50.
- Pálffy, Géza: Heraldische Repräsentation der Jagiellonen und der Habsburger. Die Wappen des königlichen Oratoriums im Prager Veitsdom im mitteleuropäischen Kontext. In: Historie – Otázky – Problémy [Praha] 7. (2015) č. 2., p. 176–190.
- Pálffy, Géza: Kampf um Transdanubien: Die Familie Nádasdy und die ungarische Aristokratie im 16. und 17. Jahrhundert. In: Die Familie Nádasdy vom 16. bis ins 20. Jahrhundert. Tagunsgband der 29. und 30. Schlaininger Gespräche 2009/2010. Hrsg. Rudolf Kropf. Red.: Karin Sperl. Eisenstadt : Amt der Burgenländischen Landesregierung, Abteilung 7 – Landesmuseum, 2015. (Wissenschaftliche Arbeiten aus dem Burgenland, 154.) p. 641, itt: p. 29–54.
- Pálffy, Géza: Le siècle des ruptures et compromis : nouvelle approche de l’histoire du Royaume de Hongrie au cours due XVIIe siècle. In: Histoire, Economie et Société, 34. (2015) No. 3., p. 78–89.
- Pálffy, Géza: Il secolo delle divisioni a dei compromessi: un nuovo approccio alla storia del Regno d’Ungheria nel corso del XVII secolo. In: Studia Historica Adriatica ac Danubiana, 8. (2015) Nr. 1–2., p. 13–28.
- Pálffy, Géza: Die Türkenabwehr und die Militärkartographie der Habsburgermonarchie in Ungarn und Kroatien–Slawonien im 16. Jh. In: Historični seminar [Ljubljana], 11. (2014) p. 37–70.
- Pálffy, Géza: Die Rolle der Familie Batthyány in der Grenzverteidigung gegen die Osmanen im 16. und 17. Jahrhundert. In: Die Familie Batthyány. Ein österreichisch-ungarisches Magnatengeschlecht vom Ende des Mittelalters bis zur Gegenwart. Tagungsband der 25.-27. Schlaininger Gespräche vom 25.-29. September 2005, 24.-28. September 2006 und 17.-20. September 2007. Hrsg. Rudolf Kropf. Redaktion: Martin Krenn. Eisenstadt : Amt der Burgenländischen Landesregierung, Abteilung 7 – Landesmuseum, 2014. (Wissenschaftliche Arbeiten aus dem Burgenland, 139. und 146.) p. 275–297.
- Pálffy, Géza: Najstariji prikazi hrvatskih zastava iz 16. i 17. stoljeća. Jedinstveni izvori za proučavanje povijesti hrvatskih državnih i nacionalnih simbola. In: Ascendere historiam. Zbornik u čast Milana Kruheka. Prired. Marija Karbić – Hrvoje Kekez – Ana Novak – Zorislav Horvat. (Biblioteka Hrvatska povjesnica – Zbornici radova) Zagreb : Hrvatski institut za povijest, 2014. p. 327–346.
- Pálffy, Géza: Izvanredan izvor o zemljopisnim znanjima ugarsko-hrvatske političke elite 16. stoljeća: popis ugarskih i slavonskih gradova, utvrda i kaštela koji su između 1526. i 1556. dospjeli u turske ruke, sastavljen za staleže Njemačko-Rimskoga Carstva. In: Scrinia Slavonica: Godišnjak Podružnice za povijest Slavonije, Srijema i Baranje Hrvatskog instituta za povijest, 14. (2014) p. 9–39.
- Pálffy, Géza: Ewige Verlierer oder auch ewige Gewinner? Aufstände und Unruhen im frühneuzeitlichen Ungarn. In: Die Stimme der ewigen Verlierer? Aufstände, Revolten und Revolutionen in den österreichischen Ländern (ca. 1450–1815). Vorträge der Jahrestagung des Instituts für Österreichische Geschichtsforschung (Wien, 18.–20. Mai 2011). Hrsg. Peter Rauscher–Martin Scheutz. Wien–München : Böhlau–Oldenbourg, 2013. (Mitteilungen des Instituts für Österreichische Geschichtsforschung, Erg.-Bd. 61.) p. 151–175.
- Pálffy, Géza: Der Adel aus den ungarischen Ländern am Kaiserhof 1526–1612. In: Die weltliche und kirchliche Elite aus dem Königreich Böhmen und Königreich Ungarn am Wiener Kaiserhof im 16.-17. Jahrhundert. Hrsg. Anna Fundárková–István Fazekas et alii. Wien : Institut für Ungarische Geschichtsforschung in Wien – Institut für Geschichte der Slowakischen Akademie der Wissenschaften – Ungarische Akademie der Wissenschaften–Pázmány Péter Katholische Universität „Lendület“ Kirchengeschichtliches Forschungsinstitut, 2013. (Publikationen der ungarischen Geschichtsforschung in Wien, Bd. VIII.) p. 37–76.
- Pálffy, Géza: Miesta konania uhorských snemov v Prešporku a Šoproni v 16. – 17. storočí (K ranonovovekým dejinám symbolickej politickej komunikácie). In: WOCH: Ročenka pre genealógiu a regionálne dejiny Bratislavy, I. (2013) č. 1., p. 16–35.
- Pálffy, Géza: Crisis in the Habsburg Monarchy and Hungary, 1619–1622: The Hungarian Estates and Gábor Bethlen. In: Hungarian Historical Review, 2. (2013) no. 4., p. 733–760.
- Pálffy, Géza: An ’Old Empire’ on the Periphery of the Old Empire: The Kingdom of Hungary and the Holy Roman Empire in the Sixteenth and Seventeenth Centuries. In: The Holy Roman Empire, 1495–1806: A European Perspective. Ed. R. J. W. Evans–Peter H. Wilson. Leiden–Boston : Brill, 2012. (Brill's Companions to European History, 1.) 401 p., p. 259–279.
- Pálffy, Géza: The Habsburg Defense System in Hungary Against the Ottomans in Sixteenth Century: A Catalyst of Military Development in Central Europe. In: Warfare in Eastern Europe, 1500–1800. Ed. Brian J. Davies. Leiden–Boston : Brill, 2012. (History of Warfare, 72.) p. 35–61.
- Pálffy, Géza: Prekogranična povezanost Nikole IV. i Nikole VII. Zrinskog (Hrvatsko-mađarska plemićka obitelj u aristokraciji Ugarsko-hrvatskog Kraljevstva i u Habsburškoj Monarhiji). In: Susreti dviju kultura: Obitelj Zrinski u hrvatskoj i mađarskoj povijesti. Zbornik radova. Ured. Sándor Bene–Zoran Ladić–Gábor Hausner. Zagreb : Matica hrvatska, 2012. (Biblioteka Zbornici, 4.) 558 p., p. 117–163.
- Pálffy, Géza: Baróni a magnáti v Uhorskom kráľovstve v 16. storočí. In: Frederik Federmayer a kol.: Magnátske rody v našich dejinách 1526 – 1948. Almanach Slovenskej genealogicko-heraldickej spoločnosti 2012. Martin : Slovenská genealogicko-heraldická spoločnosť, 2012. 379 p., p. 17–28.
- Pálffy, Géza: Korunovačné zástavy krajín Uhorskej koruny od neskorého stredoveku do začiatku 20. storočia. In: Galéria: Ročenka Slovenskej národnej galérie v Bratislave, (2011) [2013] p. 7–30.
- Pálffy, Géza: Un penseur militaire alsacien dans la Hongrie au XVIe siècle: Lazare baron von Schwendi (1522-1583). In: La pensée militaire hongroise à travers les siècles. Dir. Hervé Coutau-Bégarie–Ferenc Tóth. Paris : Institut de Stratégie Comparée EPHE IV- Sorbonne–Editions Économica, 2011. (Bibliothèque Stratégique) p. 41–59.
- Pálffy, Géza: Bündnispartner und Konkurrenten der Krone: die ungarischen Stände, Stefan Bocskai und Erzherzog Matthias 1604–1608. In: Ein Bruderzwist im Hause Habsburg (1608–1611). Ed. Václav Bůžek. České Budějovice : Jihočeská univerzita v Českých Budějovicích, Historický ústav, 2010. (Opera historica, 14.) p. 363–399.
- Pálffy, Géza: Zvláštna cesta medzi aristokraciu Uhorského kráľovstva: rod Révai v 16. storočí. In: Rod Révai v slovenských dejinách. Zborník prác z interdisciplinárnej konferencie. 16. – 17. septembra 2008, Martin. Ed. Miloš Kovačka–Eva Augustínová–Maroš Mačuha. Martin : Slovenská národná knižnica, 2010. (Studia historico-bibliographica Turociensia, 3.) p. 63–84.
- Pálffy, Géza: The Bulwark and Larder of Central Europe (1526–1711). In: On the Stage of Europe. The millennial contribution of Hungary to the idea of European Community. Ed. Ernő Marosi. Budapest : Research Institute for Art History of the Hungarian Academy of Sciences–Balassi, 2009. p. 100–124.
- Pálffy, Géza: Der Aufstieg der Familie Esterházy in die ungarische Aristokratie. In: Die Familie Esterházy im 17. und 18. Jahrhundert. Tagungsband der 28. Schlaininger Gespräche 29. September – 2. Oktober 2008. Hrsg. Wolfgang Gürtler–Rudolf Kropf. Redaktion: Martin Krenn. Eisenstadt : Amt der Burgenländischen Landesregierung, Abteilung 7 – Landesmuseum, 2009. (Wissenschaftliche Arbeiten aus dem Burgenland, 128.) p. 13–46.
- Pálffy, Géza: Verschiedene Loyalitäten in einer Familie. Das kroatisch-ungarische Geschlecht Zrinski/Zrínyi in der »supranationalen« Aristokratie der Habsburgermonarchie im 16. und 17. Jahrhundert. In: Militia et Litterae. Die beiden Nikolaus Zrínyi und Europa. Hrsg. Wilhelm Kühlmann–Gábor Tüskés unter Mitarbeit Sándor Bene. Tübingen : Max Niemeyer, 2009. (Frühe Neuzeit: Studien und Dokumente zur deutschen Literatur und Kultur im europäischen Kontext, 141.) p. 11–32.
- Pálffy, Géza: Scorched-Earth Tactics in Ottoman Hungary: On a Controversy in Military Theory and Practice on the Habsburg–Ottoman Frontier. In: Acta Orientalia Academiae Scientiarum Hungaricae, 61. (2008) No. 1–2. p. 181–200.
- Pálffy, Géza: Kaiserbegräbnisse in der Habsburgermonarchie – Königskrönungen in Ungarn. Ungarische Herrschaftssymbole in der Herrschaftsrepräsentation der Habsburger im 16. Jahrhundert. In: Frühneuzeit-Info, 19. (2008) Nr. 1. p. 41–66.
- Pálffy, Géza: Le développement du système des magasins d’armement et de l’approvisionnement en matériel de guerre dans la région de l’Empire des Habsburg aux confins de la Hongrie antiturque au cours du XVIe siècle. In: Armes et cultures de guerre en Europe centrale, XVe siècle-XIXe siècle. Paris : Musée de l’Armée, 2008. (Cahiers d’Études et de Recherches du Musée de l’Armée No 6. [2005-2006] p. 183–204.
- Pálffy, Géza: Krönungsmähler in Ungarn im Spätmittelalter und in der Frühen Neuzeit. Weiterleben des Tafelzeremoniells des selbständigen ungarischen Königshofes und Machtrepräsentation der ungarischen politischen Elite. Teil 1–2. In: Mitteilungen des Instituts für Österreichische Geschichtsforschung, 115. (2007) Heft 1–2. p. 85–111. und 116. (2008) Heft 1–2. p. 60–91.
- Pálffy, Géza: Ransom Slavery along the Ottoman–Hungarian Frontier in the Sixteenth and Seventeenth Centuries. In: Ransom Slavery along the Ottoman Borders (Early Fifteenth – Early Eighteenth Centuries). Ed. Géza Dávid–Pál Fodor. Leiden–Boston–Köln : Brill, 2007. (The Ottoman Empire and its Heritage, Politics, Society and Economy, Ed. Suraiya Faroqhi–Halil Inalcik, 37.) p. 35–83.
- Pálffy, Géza: Hofwechsel und Einflussverlust: der ungarische Adel am Hof der Jagiellonen und am Hof Ferdinands I. In: Maria von Ungarn (1505–1558). Eine Renaissancefürstin. Hrsg. Martina Fuchs–Orsolya Réthelyi unter Mitarbeit von Katrin Sippel. Münster : Aschendorff, 2007. (Geschichte in der Epoche Karls V., Bd. 8.) p. 245–260.
- Pálffy, Géza: Die Repräsentation des Königreichs Ungarn am Begräbnis Kaiser Maximilians II. in Prag 1577. In: Per saecula ad tempora nostra. Sborník prací k šedesátým narozeninám Prof. Jaroslava Pánka. Svazek 1–2. Uspor. Jiří Mikulec–Miloslav Polívka. Praha : Historický ústav Akademie věd České Republiky, 2007. Svazek 1. p. 276–283.
- Pálffy, Géza: Militärische Rechtspflege im Königreich Ungarn im 16. und 17. Jahrhundert. In: Historisches Jahrbuch, 127. (2007) p. 33–73.
- Pálffy, Géza: Zentralisierung und Lokalverwaltung. Die Schwierigkeiten des Absolutismus in Ungarn von 1526 bis zur Mitte des 17. Jahrhunderts. In: Die Habsburgermonarchie 1620 bis 1740. Leistungen und Grenzen des Absolutismusparadigmas. Hrsg. Petr Maťa–Thomas Winkelbauer. Stuttgart : Franz Steiner, 2006. (Forschungen zur Geschichte und Kultur des östlichen Mitteleuropa, 24.) p. 279–299.
- Pálffy, Géza: Návrh uhorských radcov na bratislavský korunovačný ceremoniál z roku 1561: Doteraz neznámy zásadný prameň k uhorským kráľovským korunováciám. In: Historický časopis, 54. (2006) č. 2. p. 201–216.
- Pálffy, Géza: New Dynasty, New Court, New Political Decision-Making: A Decisive Era in Hungary – The Decades Following the Battle of Mohács 1526. In: Mary of Hungary. The Queen and Her Court 1521–1531. Budapest History Museum, 30 September 2005 – 9 January 2006. Slovenská národná galéria, 2 February – 30 April 2006. [Catalogue.] Ed. Orsolya Réthelyi–Beatrix F. Romhányi–Enikő Spekner–András Végh. Budapest : Budapest Historical Museum, 2005. p. 27–39.
- Pálffy, Géza: Die adelige Funeralkultur und Typen von Grabdenkmälern im Königreich Ungarn im 16. und 17. Jahrhundert. In: Macht und Memoria. Begräbniskultur europäischer Oberschichten in der Frühen Neuzeit. Hrsg. Mark Hengerer. Köln–Weimar–Wien : Böhlau, 2005. p. 483–513.
- Pálffy, Géza: Jedan od temeljnih izvora hrvatske povijesti: Pozivnica zajedničkog hrvatsko-slavonskog sabora iz 1558. godine. In: Zbornik Odsjeka za povijesne znanosti Zavoda za povijesne i društvene znanosti Hrvatske akademije znanosti i umjetnosti, 23. (2005) p. 47–61.
- Pálffy, Géza: Die Akten und Protokolle des Wiener Hofkriegsrats im 16. und 17. Jahrhundert. In: Quellenkunde der Habsburgermonarchie (16.–18. Jahrhundert). Ein exemplarisches Handbuch. Hrsg. Josef Pauser–Martin Scheutz–Thomas Winkelbauer. Wien–München : Oldenbourg, 2004. (Mitteilungen des Instituts für Österreichische Geschichtsforschung, Ergänzungsband 44.) p. 182–195.
- Pálffy, Géza: Kriegswirtschaftliche Beziehungen zwischen der Habsburgermonarchie und der ungarischen Grenze gegen die Osmanen in der zweiten Hälfte des 16. Jahrhunderts. Unter besonderer Berücksichtigung des königlichen Zeughauses in Kaschau. In: Ungarn-Jahrbuch: Zeitschrift für interdisziplinäre Hungarologie [München], 27. (2004) p. 17–40.
- Pálffy, Géza: Der Preis für die Verteidigung der Habsburgermonarchie. Die Kosten der Türkenabwehr in der zweiten Hälfte des 16. Jahrhunderts. In: Finanzen und Herrschaft. Materielle Grundlagen fürstlicher Politik in den habsburgischen Ländern und im Heiligen Römischen Reich im 16. Jahrhundert. Hrsg. Friedrich Edelmayer–Maximilian Lanzinner–Peter Rauscher. München–Wien : Oldenbourg, 2003. (Veröffentlichungen des Instituts für Österreichische Geschichtsforschung, 38.) p. 20–44.
- Pálffy, Géza: Plemićka obitelj Budor iz Budrovca u razdoblju od 15. do 18. stoljeća. In: Podravina: Časopis za multidisciplinarna istraživanja, 2. (2003) broj 3. p. 5–75.
- Bůžek, Václav–Géza Pálffy: Integrating the Nobility from the Bohemian and Hungarian Lands at the Court of Ferdinand. In: Historica: Historical Sciences in the Czech Republic, Series Nova 10. (2003) p. 53–92.
- Pálffy, Géza: Türkenabwehr, Grenzsoldatentum und die Militarisierung der Gesellschaft in Ungarn in der Frühen Neuzeit. In: Historisches Jahrbuch, 123. (2003) p. 111–148.
- Pálffy, Géza: Die Türkenabwehr in Ungarn im 16. und 17. Jahrhundert – ein Forschungsdesiderat. In: Anzeiger der philosophisch-historischen Klasse der Österreichischen Akademie der Wissenschaften, 137. (2002) 1. Halbband p. 99–131.
- Pálffy, Géza: Der Wiener Hof und die ungarischen Stände im 16. Jahrhundert. In: Mitteilungen des Instituts für Österreichische Geschichtsforschung, 109. (2001) Heft 3–4. p. 346–381.
- Pálffy, Géza: The Impact of the Ottoman Rule on Hungary. In: Hungarian Studies Review [Toronto] Vol. XXVIII. (2001) Nr. 1–2.: Hungary 1001–2001: A Millennial Retrospection, p. 109–132.
- Pálffy, Géza: The Origins and Development of the Border Defence System against the Ottoman Empire in Hungary (Up to the Early Eighteenth Century). In: Ottomans, Hungarians, and Habsburgs in Central Europe: The Military Confines in the Era of the Ottoman Conquest. Ed. Géza Dávid–Pál Fodor. Leiden–Boston–Köln : Brill, 2000. (The Ottoman Empire and its Heritage, Politics, Society and Economy, Ed. Suraiya Faroqhi–Halil Inalcik, 20.) p. 3–69.

=== Books ===
- Hungary between Two Empires 1526–1711. Indiana University Press, 2021.
- A Szent Korona hazatér. A magyar korona tizenegy külföldi útja (1205–1978) [Coming Home: The Eleven Returns of the Holy Crown of Hungary, 1205¬1978]. Ed. Géza Pálffy. 2. edition. Budapest : MTA Bölcsészettudományi Kutatóközpont Történettudományi Intézet, 2019. 636 p.
- Soltész, Ferenc Gábor–Tóth, Csaba–Pálffy, Géza: Coronatio Hungarica in Nummis. Medals and Jetons from Hungarian Royal Coronations (1508–1916). Transl. Strong, Lara et al. Ed. Bertók, Krisztina. Budapest : Hungarian Academy of Sciences, Research Centre for the Humanities, Institute of History – Hungarian National Museum, 2019. 416 p.
- Pálffy, Géza: Die Krönungsfahnen in der Esterházy Schatzkammer auf Burg Forchtenstein. Die Geschichte der Krönungsfahnen der Länder der Stephanskrone vom Spätmittelalter bis Anfang des 20. Jahrhunderts. Eisenstadt : Esterhazy Privatstiftung, 2018. (Mitteilungen aus der Sammlung Privatstiftung Esterhazy, 10.) 226 p. (Kurzfassung in englischer, ungarischer, kroatischer, serbischer und slowakischer Sprache)
- On the Trail of the Holy Crown and Coronation Insignia of Hungary. Documentary film. International publication in 8 languages. DVD-ROM. Budapest : MTA BTK Történettudományi Intézet – Filmever Stúdió, 2018. 65 minutes
- Korunovácie a pohreby. Mocenské rituály a ceremónie v ranom novoveku. Eds. Tünde Lengyelová–Géza Pálffy. Budapest–Békéscsaba: Historický ústav Filozofického výskumného centra Maďarskej akadémie vied – Výskumný ústav Slovakov v Maďarsku, 2016. (Kor/ridor knihy, 2.) 228 p.
- Soltész, Ferenc Gábor–Csaba Tóth–Géza Pálffy: Coronatio Hungarica in Nummis. A magyar uralkodók koronázási érmei és zsetonjai (1508–1916). Szerk. Bertók Krisztina. Budapest : MTA Bölcsészettudományi Kutatóközpont Történettudományi Intézet; Magyar Nemzeti Múzeum, 2016. 416 p.
- Buzási, Enikő–Géza Pálffy: Augsburg – Wien – München – Innsbruck. Die frühesten Darstellungen der Stephanskrone und die Entstehung der Exemplare des Ehrenspiegels des Hauses Österreich. Gelehrten- und Künstlerbeziehungen in Mitteleuropa in der zweiten Hälfte des 16. Jahrhunderts. Budapest : Institut für Geschichte des Forschungszentrums für Humanwissenschaften der Ungarischen Akademie der Wissenschaften, 2015. 168 S.
- Coronatus in regem Hungariae... Medaliile de încoronare ale regilor Ungariei / Coronatus in regem Hungariae... A magyar uralkodókoronázások érmei. Autori catalog / a szövegeket összeállította: Pálffy, Géza–Soltész, Ferenc Gábor–Tóth, Csaba. Ed./Szerk. Bertók, Krisztina. Cluj-Napoca–Budapest : Muzeul Naţional de Istorie a Transilvaniei şi Muzeul Naţional Maghiar / Erdélyi Nemzeti Történeti Múzeum és Magyar Nemzeti Múzeum, 2015. (Bibliotheca Musei Napocensis XLVIII.) 239 p.
- Coronatus Posonii... Bratislavské korunovačné medaily a žetóny (1563–1830) / Coronatus Posonii... A pozsonyi magyar uralkodókoronázások érmei (1563–1830). Autori katalógu / A katalógust összeállították: Pálffy, Géza–Soltész, Ferenc Gábor–Tóth, Csaba. Bratislava–Budapest : Slovenské národné múzeum-Historické múzeum a Maďarské národné múzeum / Szlovák Nemzeti Múzeum – Történeti Múzeum és Magyar Nemzeti Múzeum, 2014. 156 p.
- Thurzovci an ich historický význam. Eds. Tünde Lengyelová–Géza Pálffy. Bratislava : Spoločnosť Pro Historia–Historický ústav SAV, 2012. 260 p.
- Pálffy, Géza: Die Anfänge der Militärkartographie in der Habsburgermonarchie. Die regelmäßige kartographische Tätigkeit der Burgbaumeisterfamilie Angielini an den kroatisch-slawonischen und den ungarischen Grenzen in den Jahren 1560–1570. Budapest : Ungarisches Nationalarchiv, 2011. 96 p. + 108 p. + Tábla / Tafel I–XXXII. + DVD-ROM
- Pálffy, Géza: Povijest Mađarske : Ugarska na granici dvaju imperija (1526.-1711.) [Prijevod s mađarskog Jelena Knežević.] Samobor : Meridijani, 2010. (Bibliotheca Historia Croatica, 57.) 295 p.
- Pálffy, Géza: The Kingdom of Hungary and the Habsburg Monarchy in the Sixteenth Century. [Translated from the Hungarian by Thomas J. and Helen D. DeKornfeld] Boulder, Colorado : Social Science Monographs–Wayne, New Jersey : Center for Hungarian Studies and Publications, Inc.–New York : Distributed by Columbia University Press, 2009. (East European Monographs, DCCXXXV.; CHSP Hungarian Studies Series, 18.) xviii, 410 p.
- Pálffy, Géza: Romlás és megújulás 1606–1703. Budapest : Kossuth Kiadó, 2009. (Magyarország története, 10.) 112 p., 9 térképpel, 35 szövegdobozzal, 145 képpel
- Pálffy, Géza: A három részre szakadt ország 1526–1606. Budapest : Kossuth Kiadó, 2009. (Magyarország története, 9.) 112 p., 11 térképpel, 32 szövegdobozzal, 135 képpel
- Hrvatsko-mađarski odnosi 1102.-1918. Zbornik radova. Glavni ured. Milan Kruhek. Ured. Milan Kruhek–Géza Pálffy–Dinko Šokčević–Mirko Valentić–Dinko Župan. Zagreb Hrvatski institut za povijest, 2004. (Biblioteka Hrvatska povijesnica; Posebna izdanja) 334 p.
- Pálfiovci v novoveku. Vzostup významného uhorského šľachtického rodu. Zborník z vedeckej konferencie Bratislava 20. mája 2003. Ed. Anna Fundárková–Géza Pálffy. Bratislava–Budapest : Spoločnosť Pro História–Academic Electronic Press, 2003. 151 p.
- Gemeinsam gegen die Osmanen. Ausbau und Funktion der Grenzfestungen in Ungarn im 16. und 17. Jahrhundert. Katalog der Ausstellung im Österreichischen Staatsarchiv 14. März – 31. Mai 2001. Text und Redaktion: Géza Pálffy. Budapest–Wien : Österreichisches Staatsarchiv-Collegium Hungaricum Wien, 2001. 40 p.
- Pálffy, Géza: A tizenhatodik század története. Budapest : Pannonica Kiadó, 2000. (Magyar Századok, 6.) 280 p.
- Pálffy, Géza: Európa védelmében. Haditérképészet a Habsburg Birodalom magyarországi határvidékén a 16–17. században. Második, javított és bővített kiadás. Pápa : Jókai Mór Városi Könyvtár, 2000. 162 p. + VIII melléklet + 1 fakszimile
- Pálffy, Géza–Miljenko Pandžić–Felix Tobler: Ausgewählte Dokumente zur Migration der Burgenländischen Kroaten im 16. Jahrhundert / Odabrani dokumenti o seobi Gradišćanskih Hrvata u 16. stoljeću. Eisenstadt / Željezno : Hrvatksi kulturni i dokumetarni centar / Kroatisches Kultur- und Dokumentationszentrum, 1999. 336 p.
- Pálffy, Géza: A császárváros védelmében. A győri főkapitányság története 1526–1598. Győr : Győr-Moson-Sopron Megye Győri Levéltára, 1999. (A győri főkapitányság története a 16–17. században, 1.) 331 p.
- A pápai vár felszabadításának négyszáz éves emlékezete 1597–1997. A bevezető tanulmányt írta és az okmánytárat összeállította: Pálffy Géza. (Szerk. Hermann István) Pápa : Jókai Mór Városi Könyvtár, 1997. 188 p. Utánnyomás: Pápa : Jókai Mór Városi Könyvtár, 2005.
- Pálffy, Géza: Katonai igazságszolgáltatás a királyi Magyarországon a XVI–XVII. században. Győr : Győr-Moson-Sopron Megye Győri Levéltára, 1995. 342 p.

== Filmography ==
- Zrínyi and the Wild Boar (Hungarian documentary film, 2017)
- Géza Pálffy's Talk on TV, 9 March 2017
- Novum TV, interviews with Géza Pálffy.
- Magyarország története (History of Hungary) (Hungarian Television, documentary film, 2010.
- A Habsburgok és Magyarország (The Habsburgs and Hungary) (Duna TV, documentary film), 2005.
