= Šiška (breed) =

Pig breed

The Šiška (from Serbo-Croatian: šiške meaning "bangs") was a primitive pig breed descending from the wild boar, or a "common wild boar", native to the Balkans, found in Bosnia and Herzegovina, Croatia, and Serbia. It is one of the ancestors of both the Mangalitsa and Turopolje pig. In 1977 Hungarian scientists believed it was extinct in Hungary, and in Serbia it is believed that it has disappeared.

== Sources ==
Field Museum of Natural History (1961). Fieldiana: Anthropology. Vol. 52–54. Field Museum of Natural History.

- Sölkner, Johann; Romanov, Michael N.; Zinovieva, Natalia A.; Weigend, Steffen; Wimmers, Klaus (2023). Traditional and Up-to-date Genomic Insights into Domestic Animal Diversity. Frontiers Media SA. ISBN 978-2-8325-1337-8.
- Adilović; et al. (2007). BOSANSKA PRIMITIVNA SVINJA «ŠIŠKA» (PDF).
- CEPIB. "Pig breeds". CEPIB.
